= Henry Hansen =

Henry Hansen may refer to:

- Henry Oliver Hansen (1919–1945), United States Marine in World War II
- Henry Paul Hansen (1907–1989), American palynologist
- Henry Hansen (cyclist) (1902–1985), Danish cyclist
- Henry Hansen (footballer) (1899-1952), Danish footballer

== See also ==
- Harry Hansen (disambiguation)
