= USS Talladega =

1944 Haskell-class attack transport

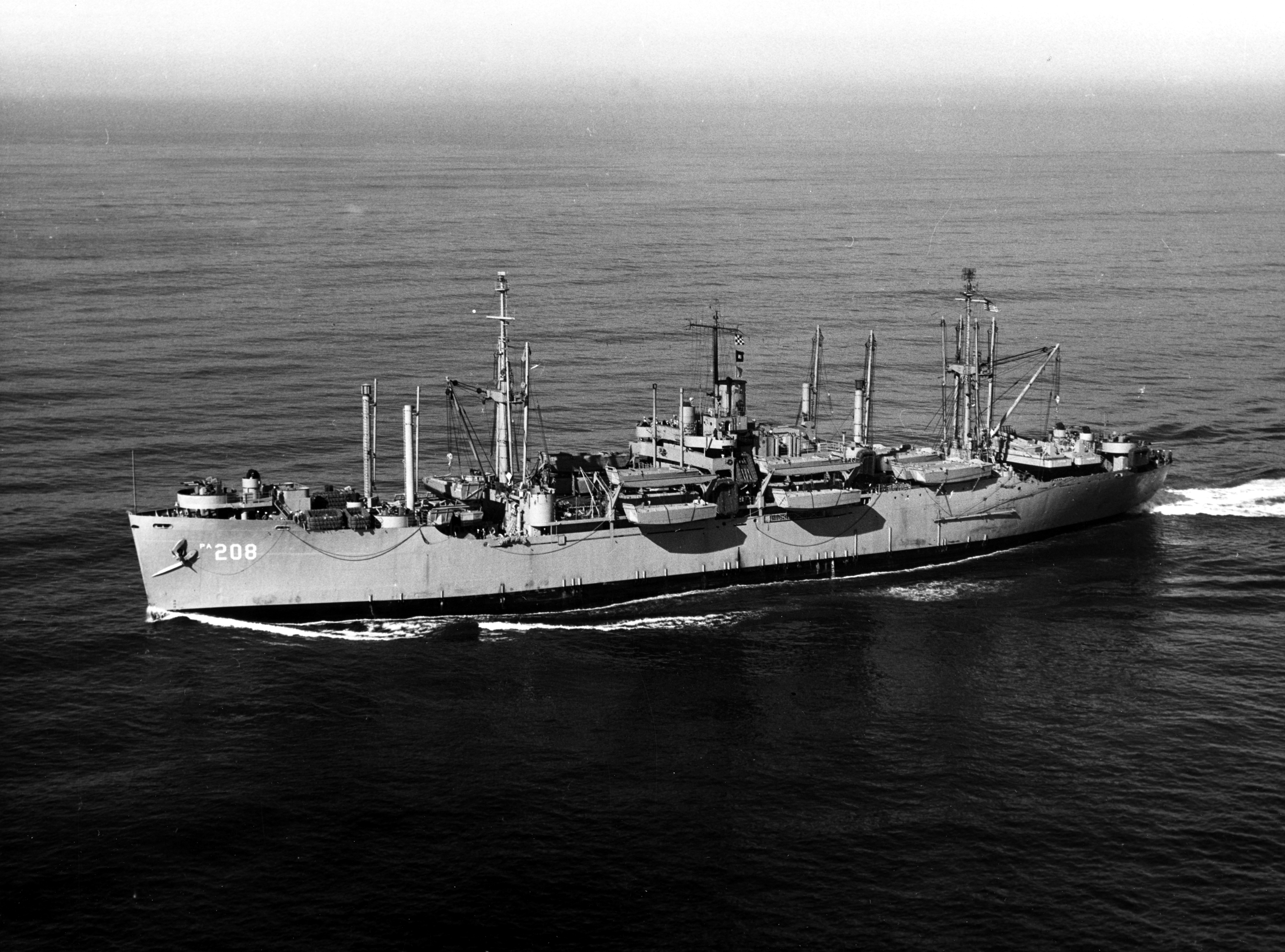

History

United States
- Name: Talladega
- Namesake: Talladega County, Alabama
- Ordered: as a Type VC2-S-AP5 hull, MCE hull 556
- Builder: Permanente Metals Corporation, Richmond, California
- Yard number: 556
- Laid down: 3 June 1944
- Launched: 17 August 1944
- Sponsored by: Miss Marie Tomerlin
- Commissioned: 31 October 1944
- Decommissioned: 27 December 1946
- Identification: Hull symbol: APA-208; Code letters: NPOR
- Honors and awards: 2 × battle stars for World War II service
- Fate: laid up in the Pacific Reserve Fleet, San Francisco Group, 27 December 1946

United States
- Recommissioned: 8 December 1951
- Decommissioned: 20 October 1969
- Reclassified: redesignated Amphibious Transport (LPA-208), 1 January 1969
- Stricken: 1 September 1976
- Identification: Hull symbol: APA-208; Hull symbol: LPA-208
- Nickname(s): "The Tremblin' T"
- Honors and awards: 2 × battle stars for Korean War service; 3 × battle stars for Vietnam War service
- Fate: temporary transfer to the Maritime Administration (MARAD), 20 October 1969, laid up in the National Defense Reserve Fleet, Olympia, Washington; permanent transfer to MARAD, 1 September 1971; towed to Suisun Bay Reserve Fleet, Suisun Bay, California, 8 June 1972; sold for scrapping, 26 May 1982, withdrawn, 1 October 1982

General characteristics
- Class & type: Haskell-class attack transport
- Type: Type VC2-S-AP5
- Displacement: 6,873 long tons (6,983 t) (light load); 14,837 long tons (15,075 t) (full load)
- Length: 455 ft (139 m)
- Beam: 62 ft (19 m)
- Draft: 24 ft (7.3 m)
- Installed power: 2 × Babcock & Wilcox header-type boilers, 465 psi (3,210 kPa) 750 °F (399 °C); 8,500 shp (6,338 kW)
- Propulsion: 1 × Westinghouse geared turbine; 1 x propeller
- Speed: 17.7 kn (32.8 km/h; 20.4 mph)
- Boats & landing craft carried: 2 × LCMs; 1 × open LCPL; 18 × LCVPs; 2 × LCPRs; 1 × closed LCPL (Captain's Gig)
- Capacity: 2,900 long tons (2,900 t) DWT; 150,000 cu ft (4,200 m^{3}) (non-refrigerated)
- Troops: 87 officers, 1,475 enlisted
- Complement: 56 officers, 480 enlisted
- Armament: 1 × 5 in (127 mm)/38 caliber dual purpose gun; 1 × quad 40 mm (1.6 in) Bofors anti-aircraft (AA) gun mounts; 4 × twin 40mm Bofors (AA) gun mounts; 10 × single 20 mm (0.8 in) Oerlikon cannons AA mounts

Service record
- Part of: TransRon 16 (WWII)
- Operations: World War II; Assault and Occupation of Iwo Jima (19–25 February 1945); Assault and occupation of Okinawa Gunto (9–14 April 1945); Korean War; Third Korean Winter (December 1952–April 1953); Korea, Summer–Fall 1953 (May 1953–July 1953); Vietnam War; Vietnam Advisory Campaign (May–July 1965); Vietnam Defense(July–October 1965); Vietnam Counteroffensive–Phase II (February–March 1966); Vietnam Counteroffensive–Phase III (October 1967)
- Awards: World War II; American Campaign Medal; Asiatic–Pacific Campaign Medal; World War II Victory Medal; Navy Occupation Service Medal; National Defense Service Medal; Philippine Liberation Medal; Philippine Independence Medal; Korean War; Korean Service Medal; United Nations Korea Medal; Vietnam War; Armed Forces Expeditionary Medal; Vietnam Service Medal; Republic of Vietnam Gallantry Cross Unit Citation; Republic of Vietnam Campaign Medal

USS Talladega (APA/LPA-208) was a Haskell-class attack transport of the US Navy. She was of the VC2-S-AP5 Victory ship design type. Talladega was named for Talladega County, Alabama.

== Construction ==
Talladega was laid down 3 June 1944, under Maritime Commission (MARCOM) contract, MCV hull 556, by Permanente Metals Corporation, Yard No. 2, Richmond, California; launched on 17 August 1944, sponsored by Miss Marie Tomerlin; and commissioned on 31 October 1944.

== Service history ==
=== World War II period ===
Following her shakedown cruise, Talladega loaded cargo and passengers at San Francisco; got underway for Hawaii on 5 December; and arrived at Pearl Harbor on 11 December. The attack transport conducted amphibious landing exercises with elements of the 28th Regimental Combat Team (RCT), 5th Marine Division, to prepare for the assault on the Volcano Islands. She departed Pearl Harbor on 27 January 1945, and proceeded via Eniwetok to the Mariana Islands.

==== Invasion of Iwo Jima ====
Talladega sortied from Saipan as a unit of Task Group 56.2, the Assault Group, on 16 February, and arrived off Iwo Jima on the morning of 19 February, "D-day". Four Marines pictured in Joe Rosenthal's famous flag-raising photograph debarked from Talladega to climb Mount Suribachi on Iwo Jima: Ira Hayes, Franklin Sousley, Harlon Block, and Mike Strank. After landing her troops, she remained off the beaches embarking combat casualties for six days before heading back toward Saipan.

==== Troop movements ====
Talladega was routed onward through Tulagi and New Caledonia to the New Hebrides. She loaded troops and equipment of the 165th RCT, 27th Infantry Division, at Espiritu Santo on 24 March and departed the next day. Her troops were part of the reserve for the invasion of Okinawa; and, after a stop at Ulithi, she arrived off that island on 9 April. She finished unloading her passengers and cargo by the 14th and returned, via Saipan, to Ulithi.

Talladega was subsequently ordered to the Philippine Islands and arrived at Subic Bay on 31 May. She remained in the Philippines, training elements of the Americal and 1st Cavalry Divisions for a projected invasion of Japan. However, before the operation began, Japan surrendered.

==== Surrender of Japan ====
On 25 August, troops of the 1st Cavalry Division embarked, and the transport headed for Yokohama the next day. Talladega was the first of the 31 Ship Convoy with occupation troops to dock at Yokohama on VJ Day, 2 September 1945. She disembarked her passengers there between 2 and 4 September, and then returned to the Philippines to pick up soldiers of the 41st Infantry Division for transportation to Japan. The attack transport reached Kure, Honshū, on 5 October.

==== Operation Magic Carpet ====
Talladega returned to Leyte on 16 October, for provisions and fuel. The next day, now taking part in Operation Magic Carpet, she loaded 1,934 veterans at Samar and sailed for the United States. The ship arrived at San Pedro, on 3 November, and disembarked her passengers. She made three more round-trips to the Pacific to return troops: to Okinawa in December 1945, to the Philippines in April 1946, and to China in July. When Talladega returned to San Francisco in July, she began preparations for inactivation and assignment to the Reserve Fleet. She was placed out of commission, in reserve, on 27 December 1946, at the Pacific Reserve Fleet, San Francisco Group.

=== Korean War recommission ===
The outbreak of hostilities in Korea on 25 June 1950, increased the Navy's need for active amphibious ships. Consequently, Talladega was recommissioned at Hunters Point, California, on 8 December 1951. She operated along the west coast until November 1952, when she embarked aviation personnel at San Francisco and steamed westward as a unit of Transport Division 12. The assault transport arrived at Yokosuka, on 29 November. She loaded men and equipment of the 1st Cavalry Division and headed for the Korean War zone.

Talladega arrived at Pusan on 14 December 1952, unloaded, and returned to Japan on 18 December. During the next nine months, the transport provided amphibious training for the United Nations forces in Japan and redeployed troops from one area in Korea to another. She operated in the war zone during each of the first seven months of 1953, but June. She worked along both coasts, transporting troops and supplies to such ports as Inchon, Koje-Do, and Sokcho, before returning to San Diego on 15 August 1953.

=== Post-war duty ===
During the next 12 years, the transport's operations along the west coast were broken by seven deployments to the western Pacific.

In 1955, the USS Talladega was featured in the World War II film classic, Battle Cry.

=== Vietnam War ===
In 1965, when United States forces assumed a combat role in South Vietnam, Talladega stood out of Long Beach on 27 April, for duty with the 7th Fleet. After calling at Pearl Harbor from 2 to 5 May, she proceeded to Guam where she loaded cargo for Vietnam. She delivered the equipment and supplies at Danang on 30 and 31 May. Following upkeep at Subic Bay, the attack transport moved to Okinawa to combat load the 3rd Battalion, 7th Marines, for passage to Vietnam. On 1 July, Talladega joined Task Group 75.6, composed of Iwo Jima and Point Defiance. Marines from the three ships were assault-landed at Qui Nhon and cleared Viet Cong forces from the mountains around Qui Nhon harbor by 6 July. They then reembarked in the ships which remained in the area until 22 July.

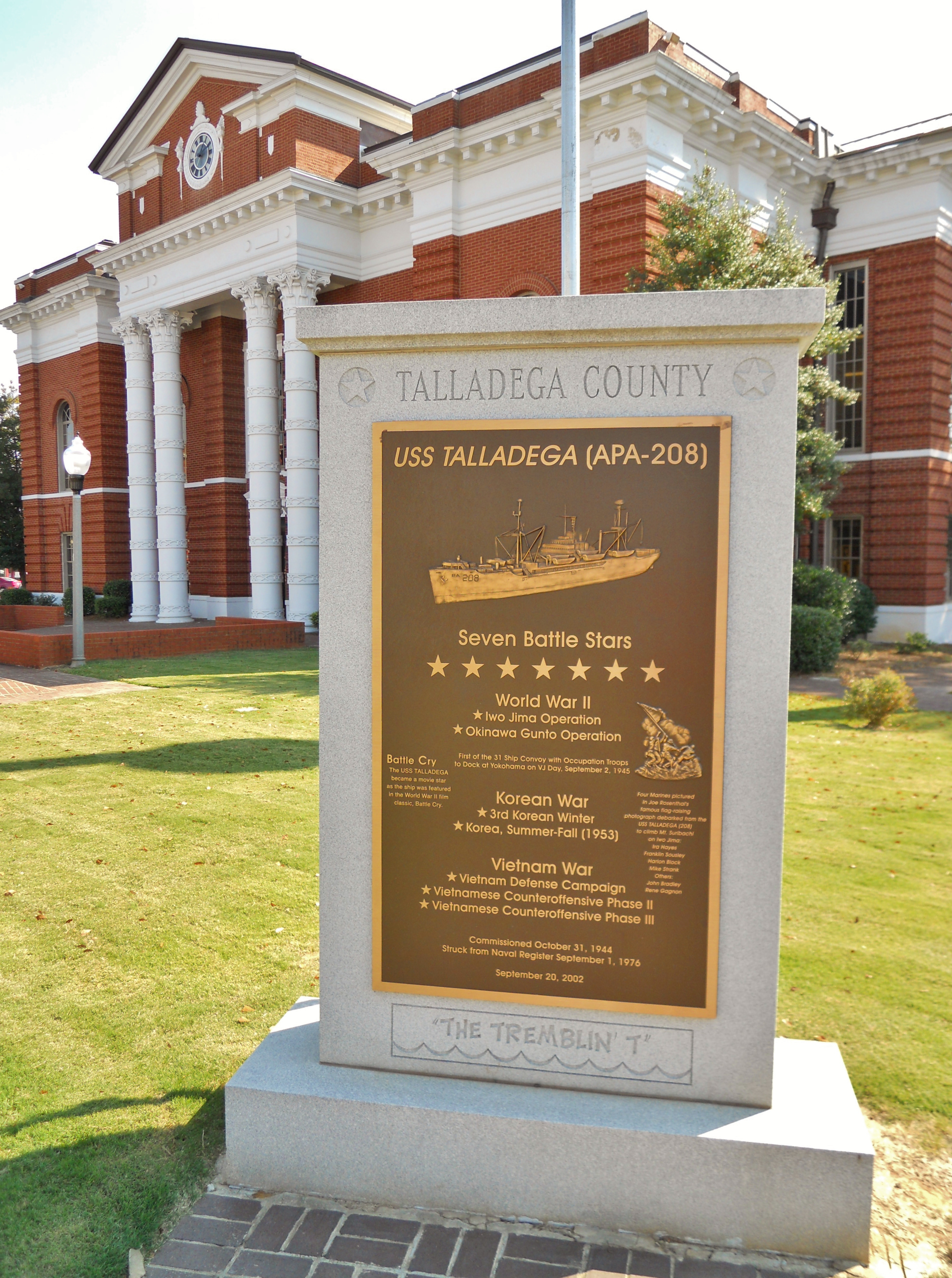
A marker honoring the achievements of the USS Talladega stands in the courthouse square of the ship's namesake, Talladega, Alabama.

From 15 to 25 August, Talladega participated in Operation Starlite, landing marines 10 miles south of Chu Lai. On 12 September, she joined Task Group 76.3 which, in mid-September and early October, conducted the first two raids by a Navy-Marine Corps team in the Vietnam War. On 11 October, the ship returned to Subic Bay and disembarked the marines and then proceeded to Okinawa to unload equipment. After calls at Yokosuka and Pearl Harbor, the transport arrived at Long Beach on 17 November 1965.

Talladega returned to the western Pacific from 14 January to 17 April 1966. During this period, she transported two loads of marines and their equipment from Okinawa to Chu Lai. In 1967, the transport was deployed from 21 July to 1 December. Elements of the 11th Infantry Brigade were transported to Hawaii in July; and, after calling at Guam, Talladega proceeded to Subic Bay. She arrived there on 27 August and began loading supplies for Vietnam. However, a change in orders sent her to Japan. The transport arrived at Yokosuka on 7 September, loaded supplies for Operation Hand Clasp, and headed for Korea the next day. She offloaded supplies at Pusan from 17 to 20 September and returned to Japan. On 12 October, Talladega got underway for Vietnam.

Talladega arrived at Vũng Tàu on 19 October, and loaded "Hand Clasp" supplies for delivery to Saigon. She offloaded the supplies between 25 and 31 October. The ship then began the return voyage to the United States. After calling at Hong Kong, Buckner Bay, and Pearl Harbor, she arrived at Long Beach, California, on 1 December 1967.

== Decommissioning ==
Talladega was placed in a caretaker status for 18 months before being decommissioned 1 July 1969. On 1 January 1969, she was redesignated LPA-208. On 20 October 1969, Talladega was transferred to the temporary custody of the Maritime Administration (MARAD) and berthed at Olympia, Washington. On 1 September 1971, the ship was transferred to the permanent custody of MARAD. In July 1972, the transport was moved to the Suisun Bay Reserve Fleet where she remained into October 1982.

On 26 May 1982, she was sold to C.W. Enterprise and Investment Company, with permission to sell to foreign scrappers. She was removed from the fleet, 1 October 1982.

== Awards ==
Talladega received two battle stars for World War II, two for Korea, and three for Vietnam.

== Notes ==
Citations

== Bibliography ==
Online resources

- "Talladega (APA-208)". Dictionary of American Naval Fighting Ships. Naval History and Heritage Command. 20 November 2015. This article incorporates text from this source, which is in the public domain.
- "Kaiser Permanente No. 2, Richmond CA". ShipbuildingHistory.com. 13 October 2010.
- "USS Talladega (LPA-208)". NavSource. 7 January 2017.
- "TALLADEGA (LPA-208)". United States Department of Transportation. Archived from the original on 25 March 2016.
- "USS Talladega (APA-208) Talladega County, Alabama". The Historical Marker database. 16 June 2016. Archived from the original on 9 January 2017.
