= Harry Hansen =

Harry Hansen may refer to:

- Harry Hansen (politician) (1919–2003), Norwegian politician
- Harry Hansen (gymnast), American Olympic gymnast
- Harry L. Hansen (1911–1992), pioneer of management education
- Harry Hansen (author) (1884–1977), American journalist, editor, literary critic and historian
- Harry Hansen (footballer)

== See also ==
- Harry Hanson (disambiguation)
- Henry Hansen (disambiguation)
- Harry Roeck-Hansen (1891–1959), Swedish stage and film actor
