= Hill Top, Fleming County, Kentucky =

Unincorporated community in Kentucky, United States

Hill Top, Kentucky
- Unincorporated community
- Location within Kentucky
- Coordinates: 38°21′37″N 83°50′21″W
- Country: United States
- State: Kentucky
- County: Fleming
- Elevation: 899 ft (274 m)
- Time zone: UTC-5 (Eastern (EST))
  - Summer (DST): UTC-4 (EDT)
- Area code: 606
- GNIS feature ID: 494256

Hill Top is an unincorporated community in Fleming County, Kentucky, United States. Hill Top is located at the junction of Kentucky Route 170 and Kentucky Route 1347, 7.1 miles (11.4 km) southwest of Flemingsburg.

== Notable residents ==
- Franklin Sousley, one of the men shown in the famous Joe Rosenthal Associated Press photograph of U.S. Marines and Sailors raising the second U.S. flag on Iwo Jima, was born in Hill Top on 19 September 1925. He was killed in action on Iwo Jima after having been shot by a Japanese sniper on 21 March 1945, about a month after the famous photograph was captured. He was only 19 years of age. His body was first interred on Iwo Jima, but was later returned home for his final interment on May 8, 1947, in Elizaville Cemetery.
