= Harlon Block =

US Marine Corps corporal (1924–1945)

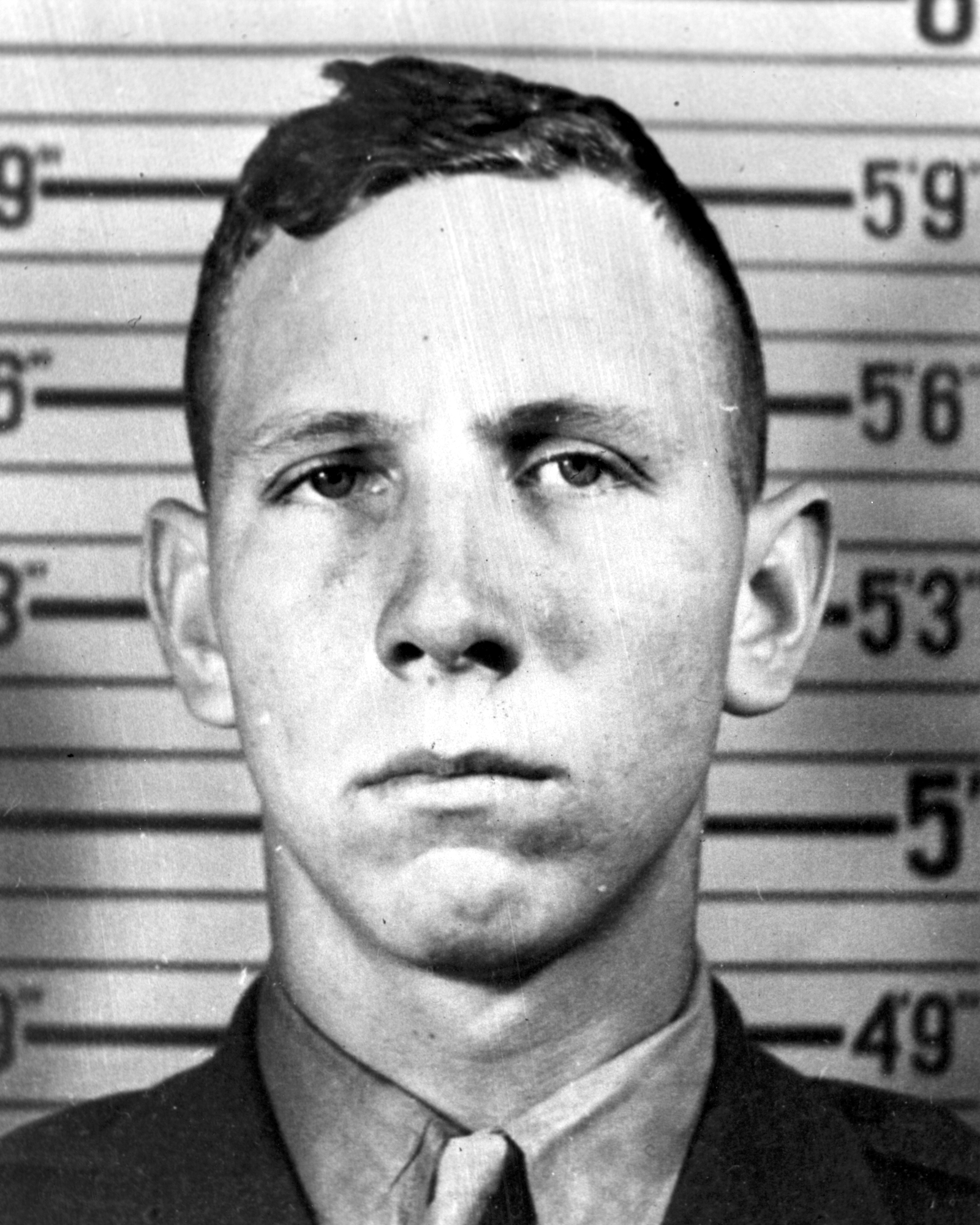
- Marine Corps recruit photo of Block in 1943
- Born: Harlon Henry Block; November 6, 1924; Yorktown, Texas, U.S.
- Died: March 1, 1945 (aged 20); Iwo Jima, Volcano Islands, Japan
- Burial place: 5th Marine Division Cemetery, Iwo Jima; 1949: Weslaco Cemetery, Weslaco, Texas; 1995: Marine Military Academy, Harlingen, Texas
- Military career
- Allegiance: United States
- Branch: United States Marine Corps
- Service years: 1943–1945
- Rank: Corporal
- Units: E Company, 2nd Battalion, 28th Marines, 5th Marine Division
- Conflicts: World War II; Bougainville Campaign; Consolidation of the Northern Solomons; Battle of Iwo Jima †
- Awards: Purple Heart Medal; Combat Action Ribbon

Harlon Henry Block (November 6, 1924 – March 1, 1945) was a United States Marine Corps corporal who was killed in action during the Battle of Iwo Jima in World War II.

Born in Yorktown, Texas, Block joined the Marine Corps with seven high school classmates in February 1943. He subsequently became a Paramarine and participated in combat on Bougainville. After the Paramarines were disbanded in 1944, he was one of the Marines who raised the second U.S. flag on Mount Suribachi on February 23, 1945, as shown in the iconic photograph Raising the Flag on Iwo Jima by photographer Joe Rosenthal.

The first flag raised over Mount Suribachi at the south end of Iwo Jima was deemed too small. Later that day, Block, a rifleman in the 5th Marine Division, was ordered up the mountain with three Marines to raise a larger flag. The second flag-raising photograph was an AP wirephoto that was widely reproduced and became famous. The second flag raising was also filmed in color.

Block was not recognized as one of the second flag-raisers until the Marine Corps announced in January 1947 (after an investigation) that he was in the photograph and Sergeant Henry Hansen was not. Block is one of three Marines in the photograph who were not originally identified as flag raisers.

The Marine Corps War Memorial in Arlington, Virginia, was modeled after Rosenthal's photograph of six Marines raising the second flag on Iwo Jima.

== Early life ==
Block was born in Yorktown, Texas, the third of six children to Edward Frederick Block (1896–1968) and Ada Belle Brantley (1896–1980), a Seventh day-Adventist family. The Block children were: Edward Jr., Maurine, Harlon, Larry, Corky, and Melford. Edward Frederick Block was a World War I veteran and supported his family by working as a dairy farmer. In hopes of improving the family, the Block family relocated to Weslaco, Texas, a city located in the Rio Grande Valley. His father became a dairy farmer, and the children attended a Seventh-day Adventist private school. Harlon Block was expelled in his freshman year when he refused to tell the principal which student had vandalized the school. Block then transferred to Weslaco High School and was remembered as an outgoing student with many friends. A natural athlete, Block led the Weslaco Panther Football Team to the Conference Championship. He was honored as "All South Texas End". Block and seven of his high school friends decided on joining the Marine Corps before they graduated and the school held a special early graduation ceremony for them in January 1943.

== U.S. Marine Corps ==
=== World War II ===
Block and seven of his high school football teammates enlisted in the Marine Corps on February 18, 1943, through the Selective Service System at San Antonio. They were sent to recruit training at the Marine Corps Recruit Depot in San Diego. On April 14, Private Block began parachute training at the Marine Parachute Training School in San Diego, and on May 22, he qualified as a Paramarine and was promoted to private first class. In November, he was sent to the Pacific Theater arriving at New Caledonia on November 15. On November 24, he was assigned to Headquarters and Service Company, 1st Marine Parachute Regiment, I Marine Amphibious Corps. On December 21, he landed on Bougainville. On December 22, he was assigned to Headquarters Company, 3rd Parachute Battalion, I Marine Amphibious Corps. On February 14, 1944, Pfc. Block returned to San Diego with his unit. On February 29, the parachutists were disbanded. On March 1, Pfc. Block was assigned to Second Platoon, E Company, 2nd Battalion, 28th Marine Regiment, 5th Marine Division at Camp Pendleton, California. In September, he was sent to Hawaii with his unit after extensive training, and began more training and preparation for the invasion of Iwo Jima. He was promoted to corporal on October 27.

==== Battle of Iwo Jima ====
On February 19, 1945, Cpl. Block landed on Iwo Jima from the USS Talladega after transferring off the USS Missoula. His rifle company was part of the 28th Marines amphibious assault landing at the southern part of Iwo Jima near Mount Suribachi. The 28th Marines mission was to capture Mount Suribachi.

===== First flag-raising =====
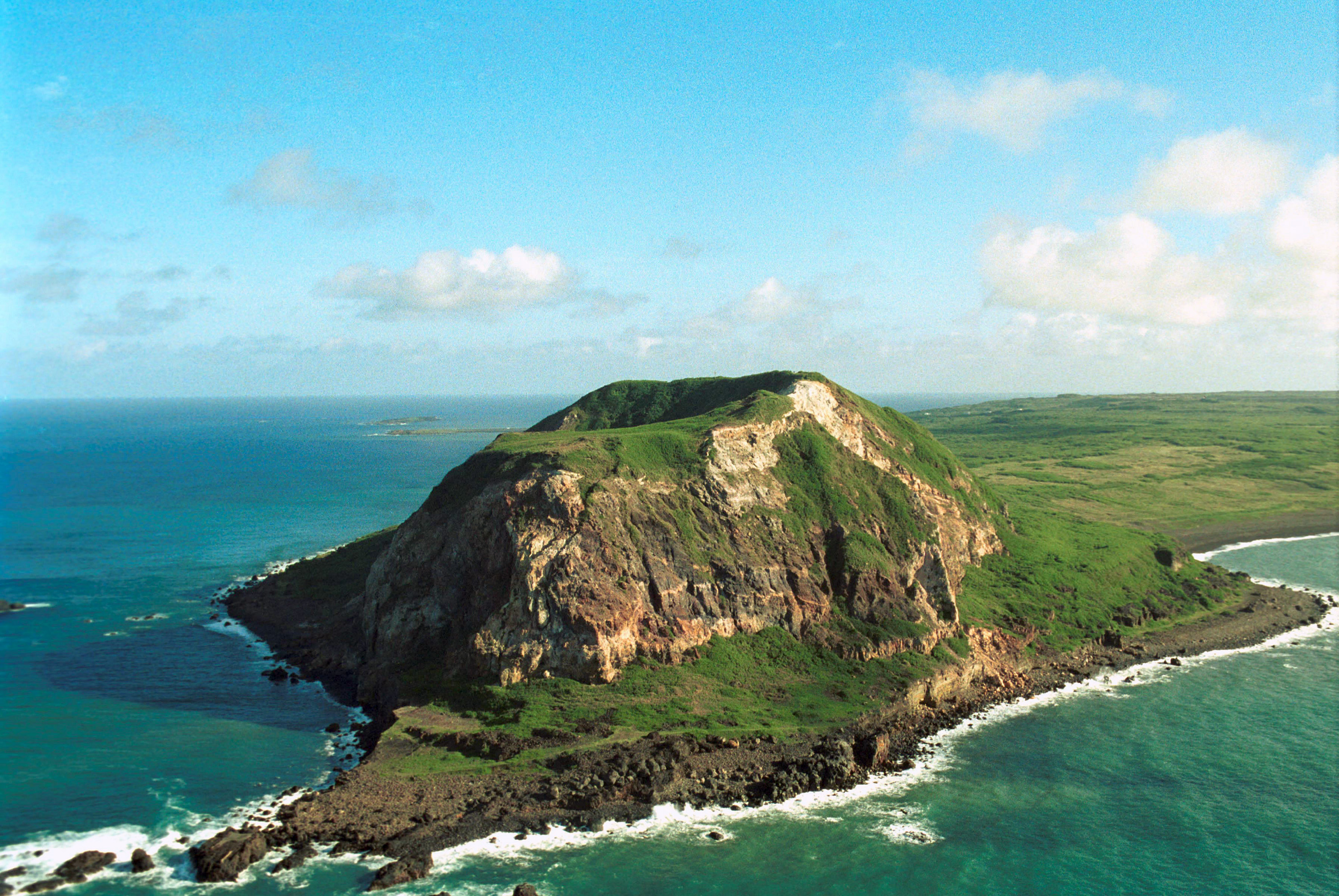
Mount Suribachi on Iwo Jima

On the morning of February 23, Lieutenant Colonel Chandler W. Johnson, commander of the Second Battalion, 28th Marines, ordered E Company's executive officer, First Lieutenant Harold Schrier, to take a platoon-size patrol up 556-foot-high Mount Suribachi to seize and occupy the crest, and if possible, raise the battalion's flag to signal the summit was secure. Captain Dave Severance, E Company's commander, assembled a 40-man patrol for the mission from the remainder of his Third Platoon and other members from the battalion. The patrol left the base of Mount Suribachi at about 8:30 a.m. Once Lt. Schrier was on top of the volcano with his men after some occasional sniper fire and a brief firefight at the rim of the crater, he and his men secured the top. After a Japanese steel pipe was found, Lt. Schrier and two other Marines attached the flag to it. The flagstaff was then taken to the highest position on top and raised by Lt. Schrier, Platoon Sergeant Ernest Thomas, Sergeant Henry Hansen, and Corporal Charles Lindberg at about 10:30 a.m. Seeing the raising of the national colors immediately caused loud cheers from the Marines, sailors, and Coast Guardsmen on the south end beaches of Iwo Jima and from the men on the ships near the beach. Due to the high winds on Mount Suribachi, Sgt. Hansen, Private Phil Ward, and Navy corpsman John Bradley pitched in to help make the flagstaff stay in a vertical position. The men at, around, and holding the flagstaff were photographed several times by Marine Staff Sergeant Louis R. Lowery, a photographer with Leatherneck magazine who accompanied the patrol up the mountain. Platoon Sgt. Thomas was killed on March 3 and Sgt. Hansen was killed on March 1.

===== Second flag-raising =====
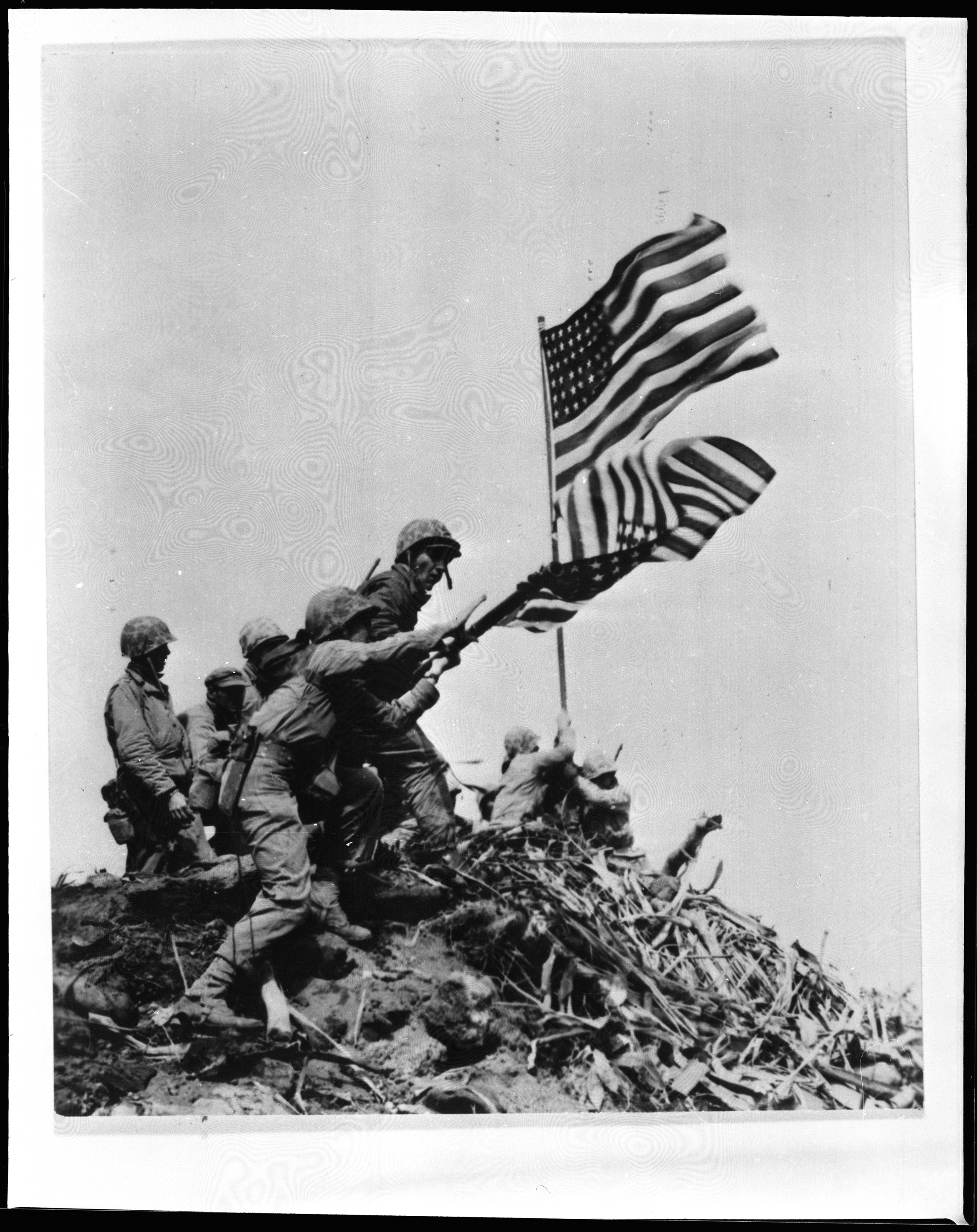
Marine Corps photo of the two flags on Mt. Suribachi. Block (backside) is helping to plant the flagstaff he helped raise.

Marine Sergeant Bill Genaust's color film of the second flag-raising (Block holding flagstaff; backside)

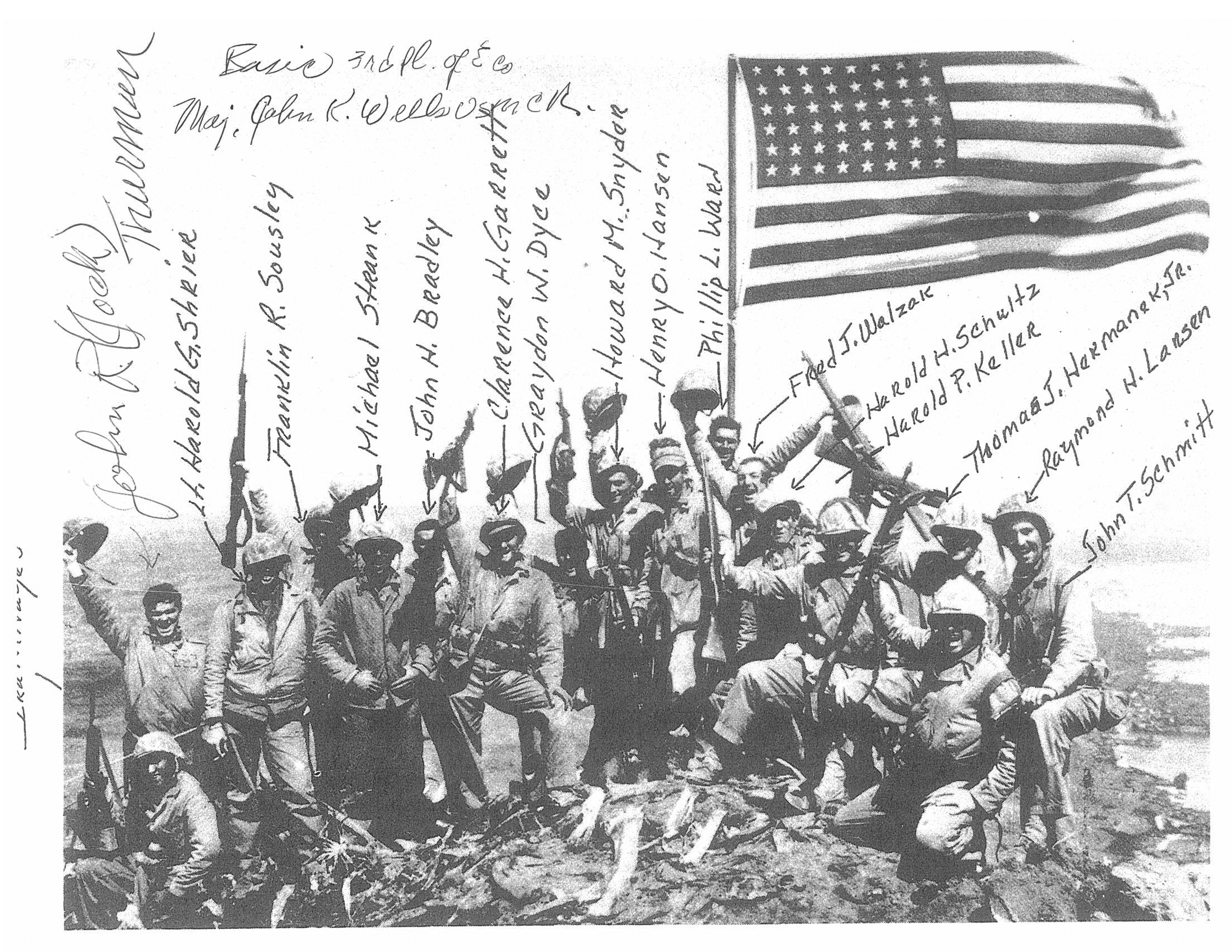
Joe Rosenthal's "Gung Ho" photo. Block's face is hidden, and he is unlabeled, but the top of his head is visible, center, behind Sgt. Henry Hansen, (soft cap)

Lt. Col. Johnson decided that a larger flag should be taken up the mountain after he determined that the battalion's flag was too small to be seen by the thousands of Marines fighting on the other side of Mount Suribachi. In the early afternoon, Capt. Severance ordered Sgt. Michael Strank, a rifle squad leader from Second Platoon, E Company, to ascend Mount Suribachi with three Marines from his squad and raise the larger flag. Sgt. Strank then ordered Cpl. Harlon Block, Pfc. Hayes, and Pfc. Franklin Sousley to go with him up the volcano with communication wire (or supplies). Pfc. Rene Gagnon, the company's runner (messenger), was ordered to take "walkie-talkie" batteries and the second flag up the mountain and return the first flag to the battalion adjutant for safekeeping down below.

When all five Marines were on top, a Japanese steel pipe was found by Pfc. Hayes and Pfc. Sousley who carried the pipe to Sgt. Strank and Cpl. Block near the first flag. The second flag was attached to the pipe and, as Sgt. Strank and his three Marines were about to raise the flagstaff, he yelled out to two nearby Marines to help them raise it. At approximately 1 p.m., Lt. Schrier ordered the raising of the second flag and the lowering of the first flagstaff. The second flag was raised by Sgt. Strank, Cpl. Block, Pfc. Hayes, Pfc. Sousley, Pfc. Harold Schultz, and Pfc. Harold Keller. Pfc. Schultz and Pfc. Keller were members of Lt. Schrier's patrol. Afterwards, rocks were added at the bottom of the flagstaff which was then stabilized by three guy-ropes. The second raising was immortalized forever by the black and white photo of the flag raising by Joe Rosenthal of the Associated Press. This flag-raising was also filmed in color by Sergeant Bill Genaust. Marine historians, with the aid of the FBI's Digital Evidence Laboratory, also confirmed that Cpl. Block is the 18th man in Rosenthal's well-known "Gung Ho" photo. Although Block's face is not visible, the top of his head (hairline and forehead) is seen directly behind Sgt. Hansen (who wears a soft cap).

On March 14, another American flag was officially raised up a flagpole by two Marines under the orders of Lt. Gen. Holland Smith during a ceremony at the V Amphibious Corps command post on the other side of Mount Suribachi where the 3rd Marine Division troops were located. The flag flying on the summit of Mount Suribachi since February 23 was taken down. On March 26, 1945, the island was considered secure and the battle of Iwo Jima was officially ended. The 28th Marines left Iwo Jima on March 27 and returned to Hawaii to the 5th Marine Division training camp. Lt. Col. Johnson was killed in action on Iwo Jima on March 2 and Sgt. Genaust was killed on March 4. Sgt. Strank and Cpl. Block were killed on March 1 and Pfc. Sousley was killed on March 21.

==== Death ====
According to the book Flags of Our Fathers by James Bradley (son of Navy corpsman John Bradley), when Sgt. Strank was killed on March 1, Cpl. Block assumed command of Strank's squad in E Company's Second Platoon and, later the same day, Cpl. Block was mortally wounded by an enemy mortar round explosion while leading the squad during an attack toward Nishi Ridge. Cpl. Block's last words were "They killed me!" However, Ralph Griffiths, a member of the same platoon as Cpl. Block, claimed that Sgt. Strank and Cpl. Block were killed instantly by the same shell which wounded him on March 1. Cpl. Block was originally buried in the 5th Marine Division Cemetery on Iwo Jima on March 5, 1945. A service was held there on March 26 with Pfc. Hayes and other members of E Company in attendance. In January 1949, Cpl. Block's remains were re-interred in Weslaco, Texas. In 1995, his body was moved to a burial place at the Marine Military Academy near its Iwo Jima monument in Harlingen, Texas.

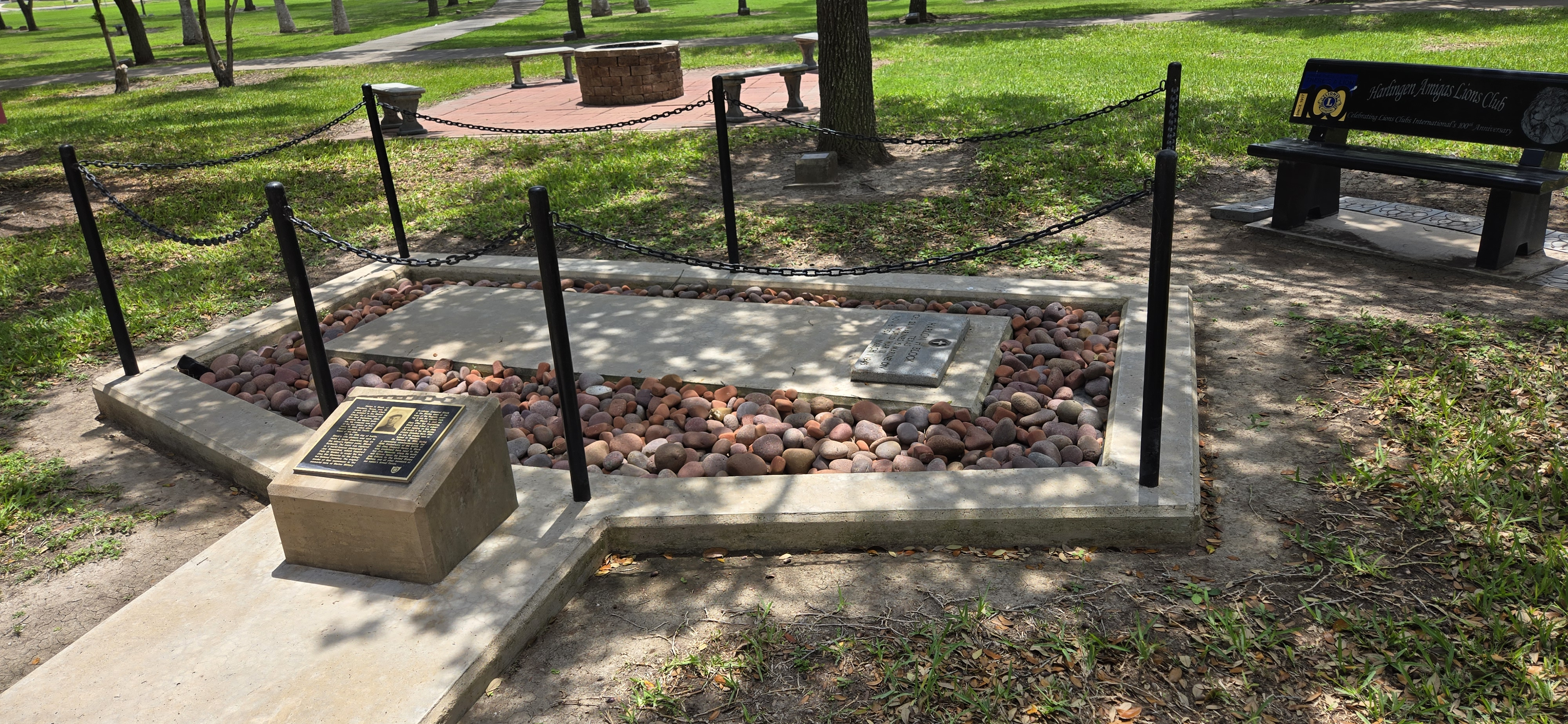
Harlon Block's grave on the grounds of the Iwo Jima Memorial in Harlingen, Texas

== Marine Corps War Memorial ==
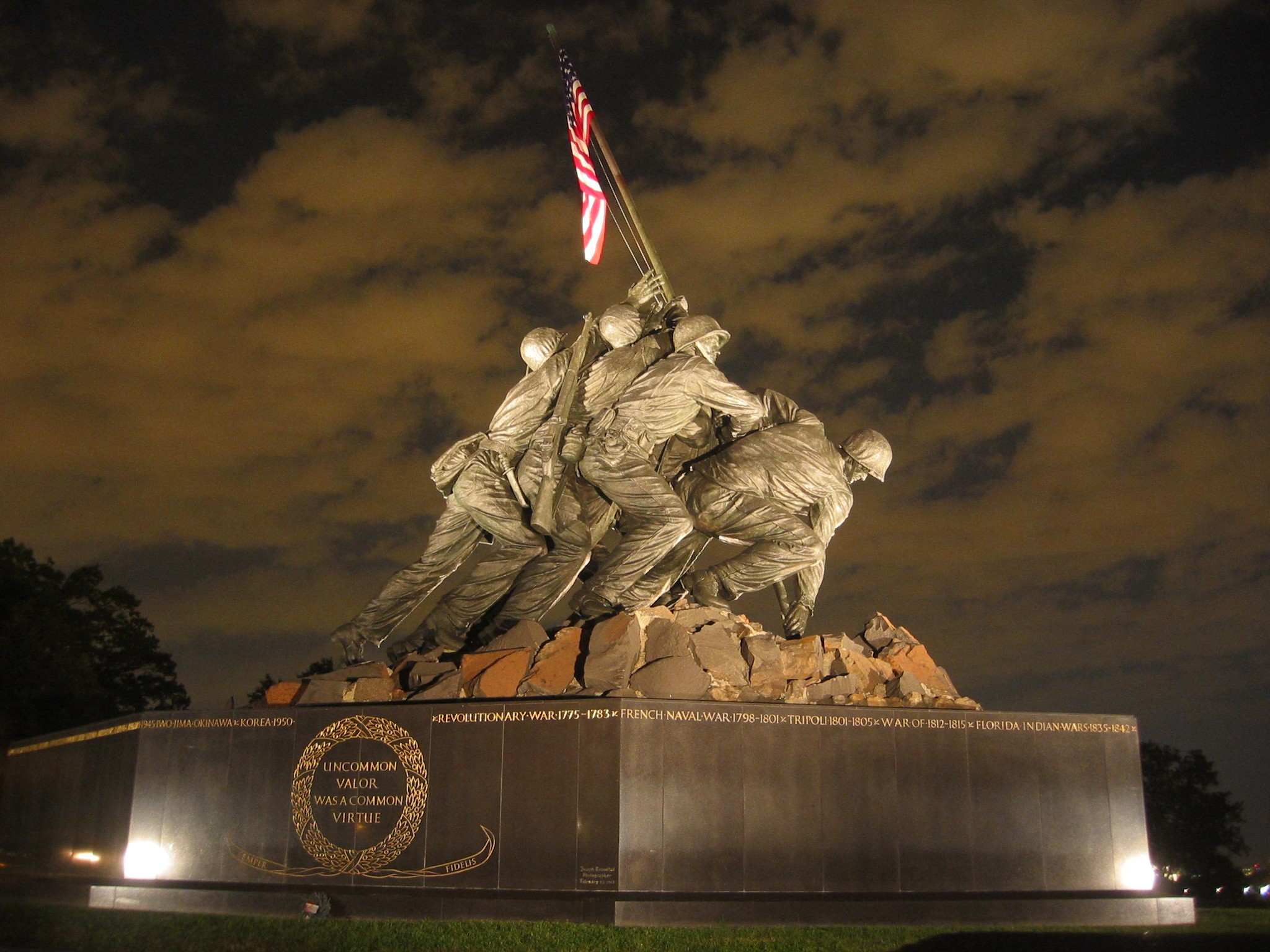
The U.S. Marine Corps War Memorial in Arlington, Virginia

The Marine Corps War Memorial (also known as the Iwo Jima Memorial) in Arlington, Virginia, was dedicated on November 10, 1954. Sculptor Felix de Weldon was inspired to make the memorial after seeing Rosenthal's photograph of the second flag raising. De Weldon sculptured the flag raisers' images and positions on the memorial from the photograph. Due to the incorrect identification of the first flag raiser positioned at the bottom of the flagstaff as Sgt. Henry "Hank" Hansen in 1945 (Hansen helped raise the first flag), Hansen was depicted as the first 32-foot (9.8-meter) bronze statue at the base of the flagstaff on the monument until the Marine Corps announced in January 1947 that Cpl. Block was actually the flag raiser in the photograph. The Memorial was turned over to the National Park Service in 1955.

During the dedication, President Dwight D. Eisenhower sat upfront with Vice President Richard Nixon, Secretary of Defense Charles E. Wilson, Deputy Secretary of Defense Robert Anderson, Assistant Secretary of the Interior Orme Lewis, and General Lemuel C. Shepherd, the 20th Commandant of the Marine Corps. Ira Hayes, one of the three surviving flag raisers depicted on the monument was also seated upfront alongside John Bradley (incorrectly identified as a flag raiser until June 2016), Rene Gagnon (incorrectly identified as a flag raiser until October 2019), Mrs. Ada Belle Block, Mrs. Martha Strank, and Mrs. Goldie Price (mother of Franklin Sousley). Those giving remarks at the dedication included Robert Anderson, Chairman of Day; Colonel J.W. Moreau, U.S. Marine Corps (Retired), President, Marine Corps War Memorial Foundation; General Shepherd, who presented the memorial to the American people; Felix de Weldon, sculptor; and Richard Nixon, who gave the dedication address. Inscribed on the memorial are the following words:

In Honor And Memory Of The Men of The United States Marine Corps Who Have Given Their Lives To Their Country Since 10 November 1775

== Second flag-raiser corrections ==
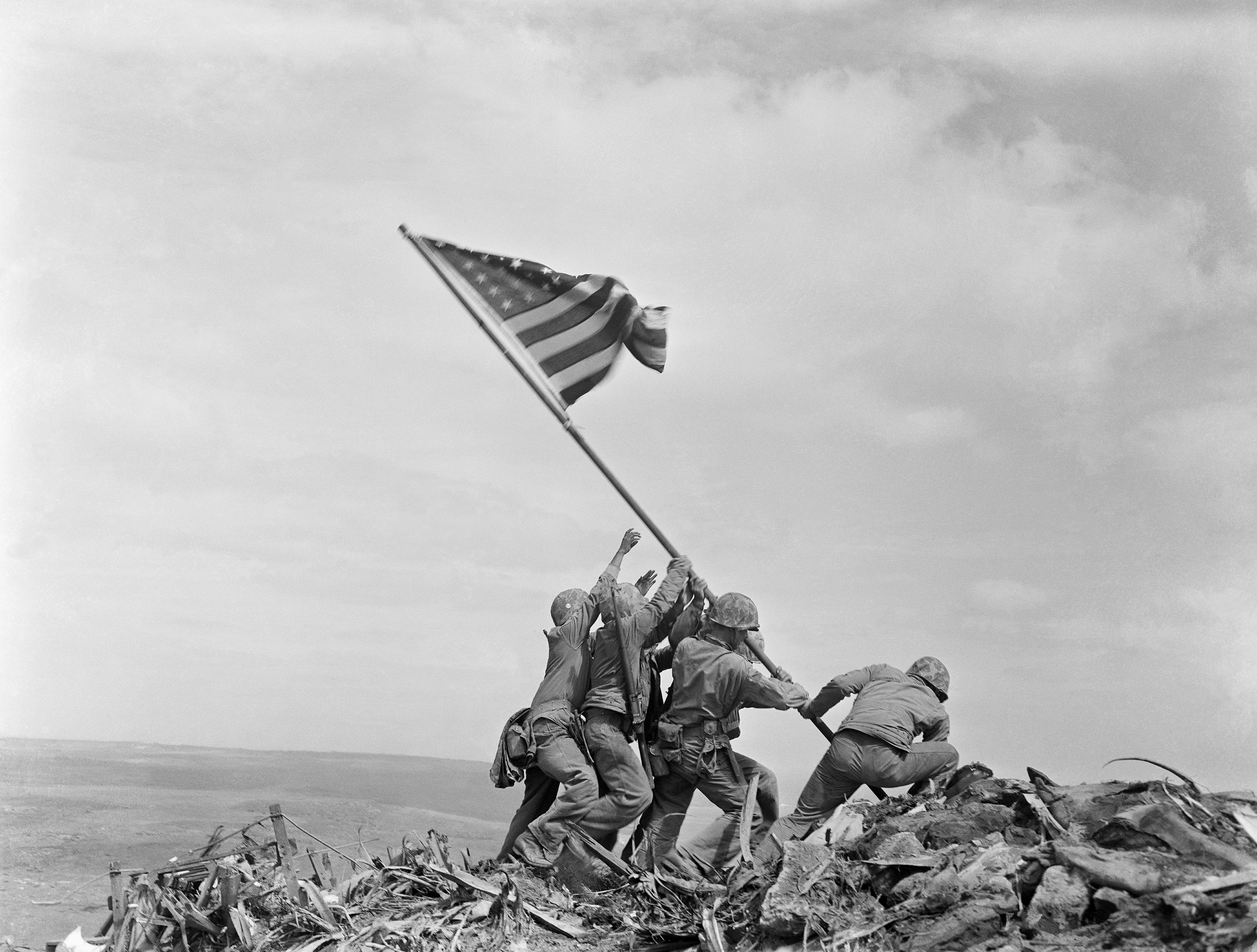
Second flag-raising photograph

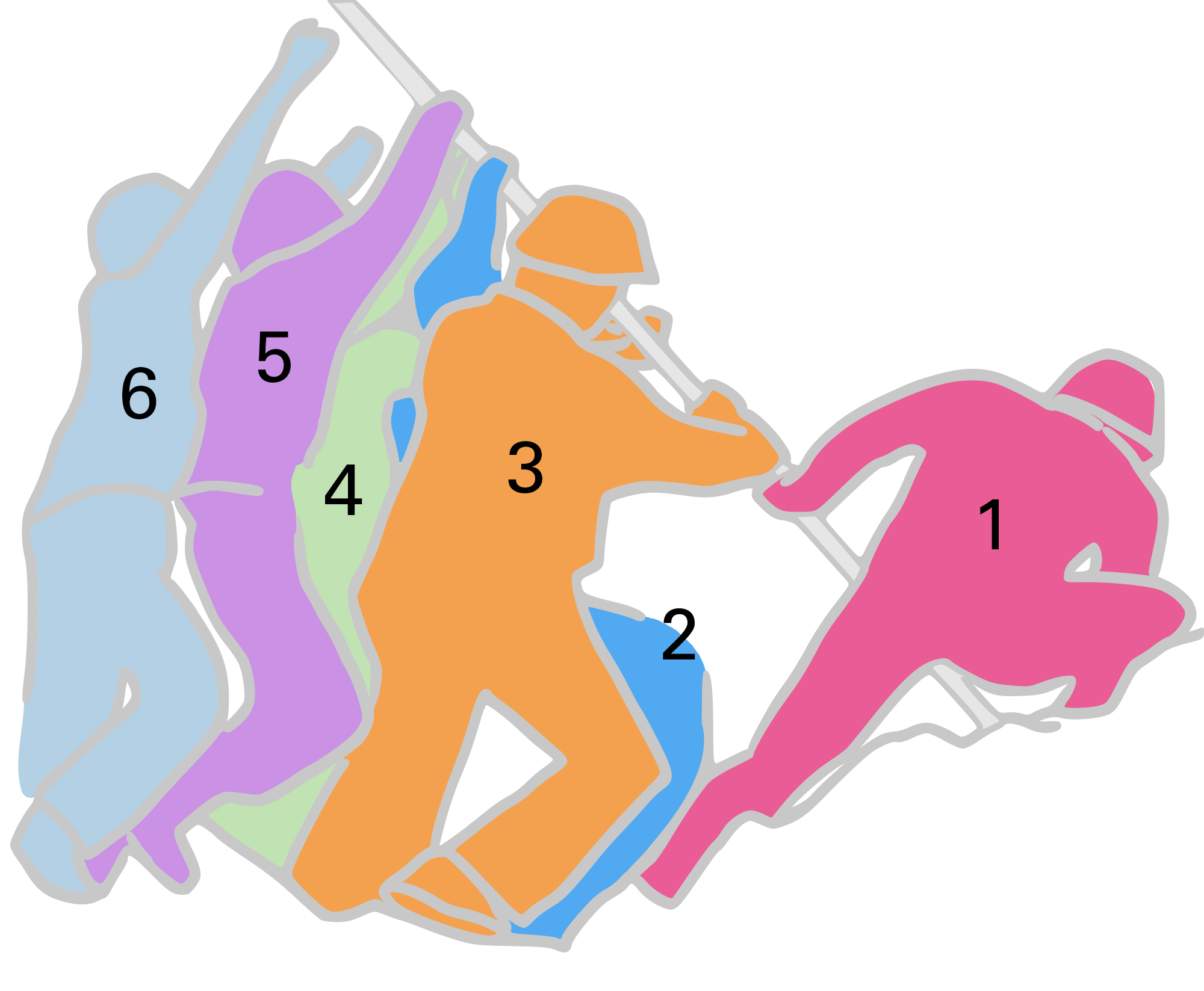
The six second flag-raisers: #1, Cpl. Harlon Block (KIA) #2, Pfc. Harold Keller #3, Pfc. Franklin Sousley (KIA) #4, Sgt. Michael Strank (KIA) #5, Pfc. Harold Schultz #6, Pfc. Ira Hayes

On March 20, 1945, President Roosevelt ordered the flag-raisers in Rosenthal's photograph to Washington D.C. after the battle. Pfc. Gagnon was ordered to Washington on April 3 and arrived on April 7. He was questioned the same day by a Marine public information officer about all the identities of the flag raisers in the photograph. He identified the six flag raisers as Sgt. Strank, Pfc. Sousley, Navy corpsman John Bradley, Pfc. Ira Hayes, and Sgt. Henry Hansen, and himself. He also said Sgt. Strank, Sgt. Hansen, and Pfc. Sousley were killed on Iwo Jima. After Pfc. Gagnon was questioned, Pfc. Hayes and PhM2c. Bradley were ordered to Washington. Bradley, who was recovering from his wounds at Oakland Naval Hospital in Oakland, California, was transferred to Bethesda Naval Hospital at Bethesda, Maryland, where he was shown Rosenthal's flag-raising photograph and was told he was in it. Both Bradley (on crutches) and Hayes arrived in Washington on April 19. They reported to the same officer and were questioned separately. PhM2c. Bradley agreed with all of the identities of the flag-raisers named by Pfc. Gagnon in the photograph including his own. Pfc. Hayes agreed with all of the identities named by Pfc. Gagnon except Sgt. Hansen, who he said was Cpl. Block at the base of the flagstaff. The Marine lieutenant colonel told Pfc. Hayes that the identities were made public on April 8 and would not be changed, and to not say anything about it anymore (the officer later denied that Pfc. Hayes ever told him that Cpl. Block was in the photograph).

A Marine Corps investigation of the identities of the six second flag-raisers began in December 1946 and concluded in January 1947 that it was Cpl. Block and not Sgt. Hansen at the base of the flagstaff in the Rosenthal photograph, and that no blame was to be placed on anyone in this matter. The identities of the other five second flag-raisers were confirmed.

The Marine Corps review board looked once more into the identities of the six second flag-raisers in Rosenthal's photograph, this time concluding in June 2016 that Harold Schultz was in the photograph and John Bradley was not. Franklin Sousley, not Schultz, is now in the position initially ascribed to Bradley (fourth from left) in the photograph and Schultz is now in Sousley's former position (second from left) in the photograph. The identities of the other five flag-raisers were confirmed. Schultz did not ever say publicly that he was a flag-raiser or in the photograph.

A third Marine Corps investigation into the identities of the six second flag-raisers concluded in October 2019, that Harold Keller was in the Rosenthal's photograph in place of Rene Gagnon (fifth from left). Gagnon who carried the larger second flag up Mount Suribachi, helped lower the first flagstaff and removed the first flag at the time the second flag was raised. The identities of the other five flag raisers were confirmed. Like Schultz, Keller did not ever say publicly he was a flag-raiser or that he was in the photograph.

== Military awards ==
Block's military decorations and awards include:

Purple Heart Medal	Combat Action Ribbon	Navy Presidential Unit Citation
American Campaign Medal	Asiatic-Pacific Campaign Medal with two 3/16" bronze stars	World War II Victory Medal

Parachutist Badge
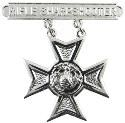
Rifle Sharpshooter Badge

== In film ==
Block is played by American actor Benjamin Walker in the 2006 film Flags of Our Fathers, directed by Clint Eastwood and produced by Eastwood, Steven Spielberg, and Robert Lorenz. His parents are portrayed by Christopher Curry and Judith Ivey. The film is based on the 2000 book of the same title.

== Public honors ==
- Marine Corps War Memorial
- Harlon Block exhibit, Weslaco Museum, Weslaco, Texas
- Harlon Block Memorial (Texas National Guard Armory), Weslaco, Texas
- Harlon Block Sports Complex (Park), Weslaco, Texas

== See also ==
- Flags of Our Fathers
- Raising the Flag on Iwo Jima
- Shadow of Suribachi: Raising The Flags on Iwo Jima
- Meliton Kantaria – Soviet flag raiser over the Reichstag in Berlin, 1945.
- Mikhail Yegorov – Soviet flag raiser over the Reichstag in Berlin, 1945.
