= Benjamin Franklin Medal (Royal Society of Arts) =

UK annaul award

The Royal Society of Arts Benjamin Franklin Medal was instituted in 1956 to commemorate the 250th anniversary of Benjamin Franklin's birth and the 200th anniversary of his membership to the Royal Society of Arts.

The medal is conferred by the RSA on individuals, groups, and organisations who have made profound efforts to forward Anglo-American understanding in areas closely linked to the RSA's agenda. It is also awarded to recognise those that have made a significant contribution to global affairs through co-operation and collaboration between the United Kingdom and the United States.

The medal is awarded annually, alternately to citizens of the United Kingdom and the United States.

The Benjamin Franklin Medal was designed by Christopher Ironside OBE, in 1956.

== Medalists ==
- 1957 Professor Frederic Calland Williams OBE DSc MIEE FRS, professor of electrical engineering at the University of Manchester
- 1958 Peter Ustinov, actor, producer, director, playwright
- 1959 George Horatio Nelson MA MICE MIMechE MIEE, managing director of The English Electric Company Limited
- 1960 Robert Nicholson, FSIA exhibition and interior designer
- 1961 Alick Dick, chairman and managing director of Standard-Triumph International Limited
- 1962 The Lord Rootes GBE, joint founder of the Rootes Group
- 1963 John Hay Whitney, American diplomatist and publisher
- 1964 Sir Evelyn Wrench KCMG, founder of the English-Speaking Union and of the Overseas League
- 1965 Paul Mellon, American business and foundation executive
- 1966 Sir Denis Brogan D-es Lettres LLD, writer on United States affairs
- 1967 Dr. Detlev Bronk, president of the Rockefeller University
- 1968 Peter Wilson, chairman of Sotheby's
- 1969 Dr. Louis Booker Wright PhD Dlitt LHD, director of the Folger Shakespeare Library, Washington, DC
- 1970 Sir Denning Pearson, chief executive and chairman of Rolls-Royce Limited
- 1971 David Bruce, diplomat
- 1972 Sir William Walton OM, composer
- 1973 Alistair Cooke, writer and journalist
- 1974 Dame Margot Fonteyn DBE, prima ballerina
- 1975 Wilmarth Sheldon Lewis, English scholar
- 1976 Rt Hon Harold Macmillan, statesman and publisher
- 1977 J. William Fulbright, former United States Senator for Arkansas
- 1978 Dr. Ivor Armstrong Richards, professor emeritus of Harvard University
- 1979 Professor Henry-Russell Hitchcock, writer and lecturer on architectural history
- 1980 Sir Bernard Lovell OBE FRS, professor of radio astronomy, University of Manchester and then-director of Jodrell Bank Observatory
- 1981 Lincoln Kirstein, director, School of American Ballet, New York City Ballet Company
- 1982 The Lord Sherfield GCB GCMG Diplomat
- 1983 Dr. Lewis Mumford, writer and teacher on town and country planning
- 1984 The Lord Gordon Richardson of Duntisbourne, retired Governor of the Bank of England
- 1985 Harry L. Hansen, professor at the Harvard Graduate School of Business Administration
- 1986 Sir David Wills CBE TD DL, former chairman of the Ditchley Foundation
- 1987 Kingman Brewster, diplomat
- 1988 Professor Esmond Wright, English scholar
- 1989 Sam Wanamaker, actor, director and founder of Shakespeare's Globe Theatre
- 1990 Sir David Attenborough, naturalist and broadcaster
- 1991 Edward Streator, diplomat
- 1993 Robert Venturi and Denise Scott Brown, architects
- 1994 Sir John Templeton, financial analyst and philanthropist
- 1995 The Honorable Raymond G. H. Seitz, diplomat
- 1996 Sir David Puttnam, film producer
- 1997 William R. Hewlett, co-founder and director emeritus of Hewlett-Packard Company
- 1998 Sir Alex Trotman, chairman and chief executive officer of Ford Motor Company
- 1999 Senator George J. Mitchell, special counsel and chairman of the peace negotiations in Northern Ireland
- 2000 Dame Judi Dench, actress
- 2001 Ambassador Philip Lader, former US Ambassador to the Court of St James's
- 2002 Dame Marjorie Scardino, chief executive officer of Pearson PLC
- 2003 General Colin Powell, former US Secretary of State
- 2004 Jonathan Ive, vice-president of design, Apple Computer
- 2005 Dr. Amory Lovins, chief executive officer of Rocky Mountain Institute
- 2008 Sir Ken Robinson, author, educator
- 2009 Professor Elizabeth Gould, psychologist, UCLA
- 2010 Professor Jonathan Israel, School of Historical Studies, Institute for Advanced Study, Princeton, New Jersey.
- 2011 Professor Lawrence W. Sherman, Institute of Criminology, University of Cambridge.
- 2013 Walter Isaacson, thought leader and author, CEO of the Aspen Institute
- 2015 Chris Anderson, entrepreneur and the curator of TED
- 2016 Wendy Kopp, CEO and co-founder of Teach For All
- 2018 Herbie Hancock, musician/composer
- 2024 Dr. Raj Chetty, Economist
