= Harry Hanson =

Harry Hanson may refer to:

- Harry Hanson (baseball) (1896–1966), American baseball catcher
- Harry Hanson (sailor) (1900–1986), Swedish competition sailor

== See also ==
- Harry Hansen (disambiguation)
