= Henry Oliver Hansen =

United States Marine Corps sergeant (1919-1945)

Hank Hansen
- Hansen as a Paramarine in 1942
- Born: December 14, 1919; Somerville, Massachusetts, U.S.
- Died: March 1, 1945 (aged 25); Iwo Jima, Bonin Islands, Japan
- Burial place: National Memorial Cemetery of the Pacific
- Military career
- Allegiance: United States of America
- Branch: United States Marine Corps
- Service years: 1938–1945
- Rank: Sergeant
- Unit: 2nd Battalion, 28th Marines
- Conflicts: World War II; Bougainville Campaign; Volcano and Ryukyu Islands campaign; Battle of Iwo Jima †
- Awards: Purple Heart Medal; Combat Action Ribbon

Henry Oliver Hansen (December 14, 1919 – March 1, 1945) was a United States Marine Corps sergeant who was killed in action during the Battle of Iwo Jima in World War II. He was a member of the patrol that captured Mount Suribachi, where he helped raise the first U.S. flag on Iwo Jima on February 23, 1945. He was killed six days later.

The first flag flown over the southern end of Iwo Jima was regarded to be too small to be seen by the thousands of Marines fighting on the other side of the mountain where the Japanese airfields and most of their troops were located, so it was replaced the same day with a larger flag. Although there were photographs taken of the first flag flying on Mount Suribachi and some which include Hansen, there is no photograph of Marines raising the first flag. Hansen also was photographed near the second flag.

The second flag-raising by six Marines was photographed by Associated Press combat photographer Joe Rosenthal and became famous after copies of his photograph appeared in the newspapers two days later. He was incorrectly identified in Rosenthal's flag-raising photograph as the Marine at the base of the flagstaff until the Marine Corps announced in January 1947 after an investigation which was initiated by one of the flag-raisers, that Corporal Harlon Block was that Marine. Hansen is one of three men who were originally identified incorrectly as flag-raisers in the photograph (the others being John Bradley and Rene Gagnon).

The Marine Corps War Memorial in Arlington, Virginia, is modeled after the historic photograph of six Marines raising the second flag on Iwo Jima.

== Early life ==
Hansen was born to Henry T. Hansen (1891-1966) and Madeline T. Dwyer (1895-1970) in Somerville, Massachusetts, with one sister and three brothers. He graduated from Somerville High School in 1938 and joined the Marine Corps.

== U.S. Marine Corps ==
=== World War II ===
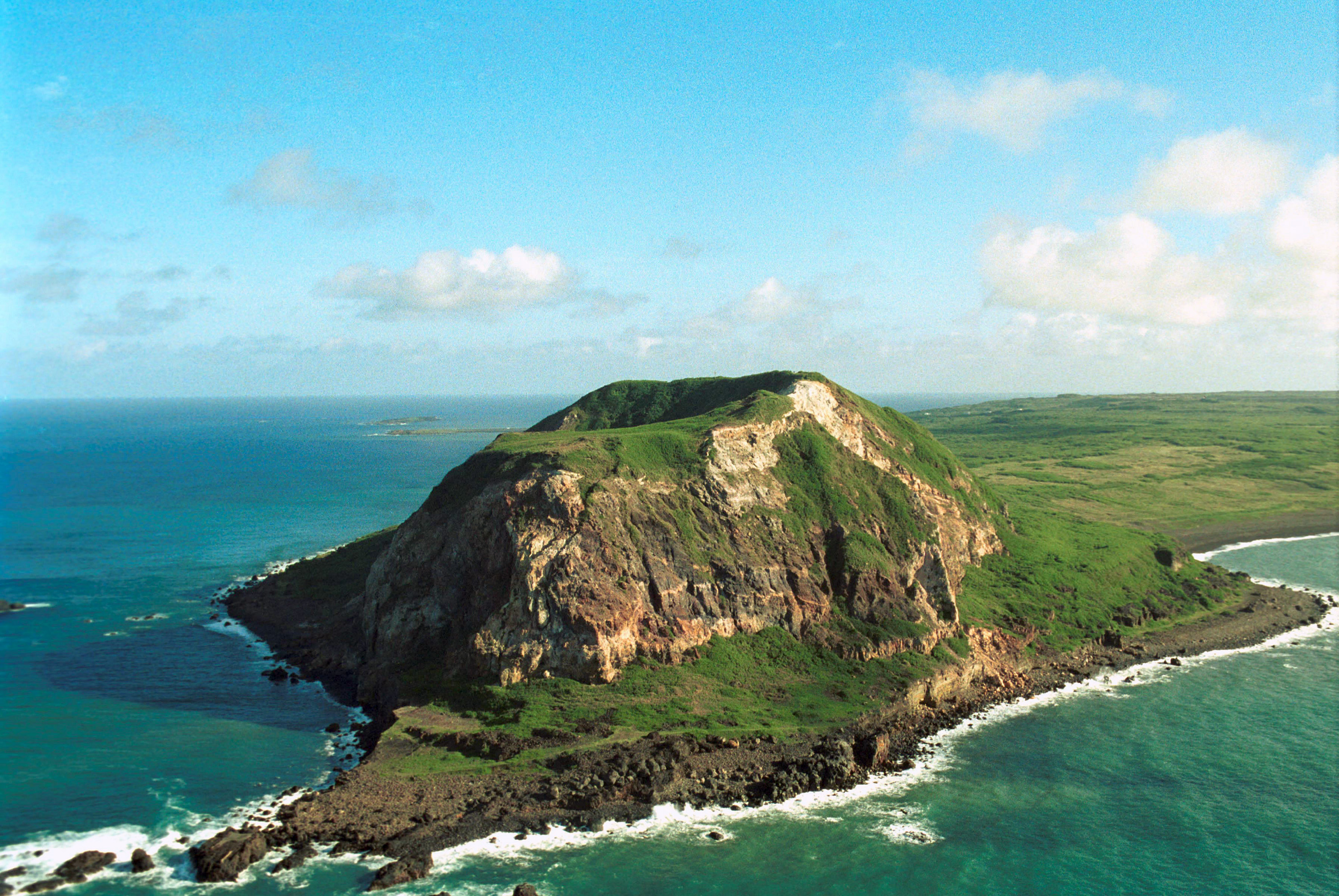
Mount Suribachi on Iwo Jima.

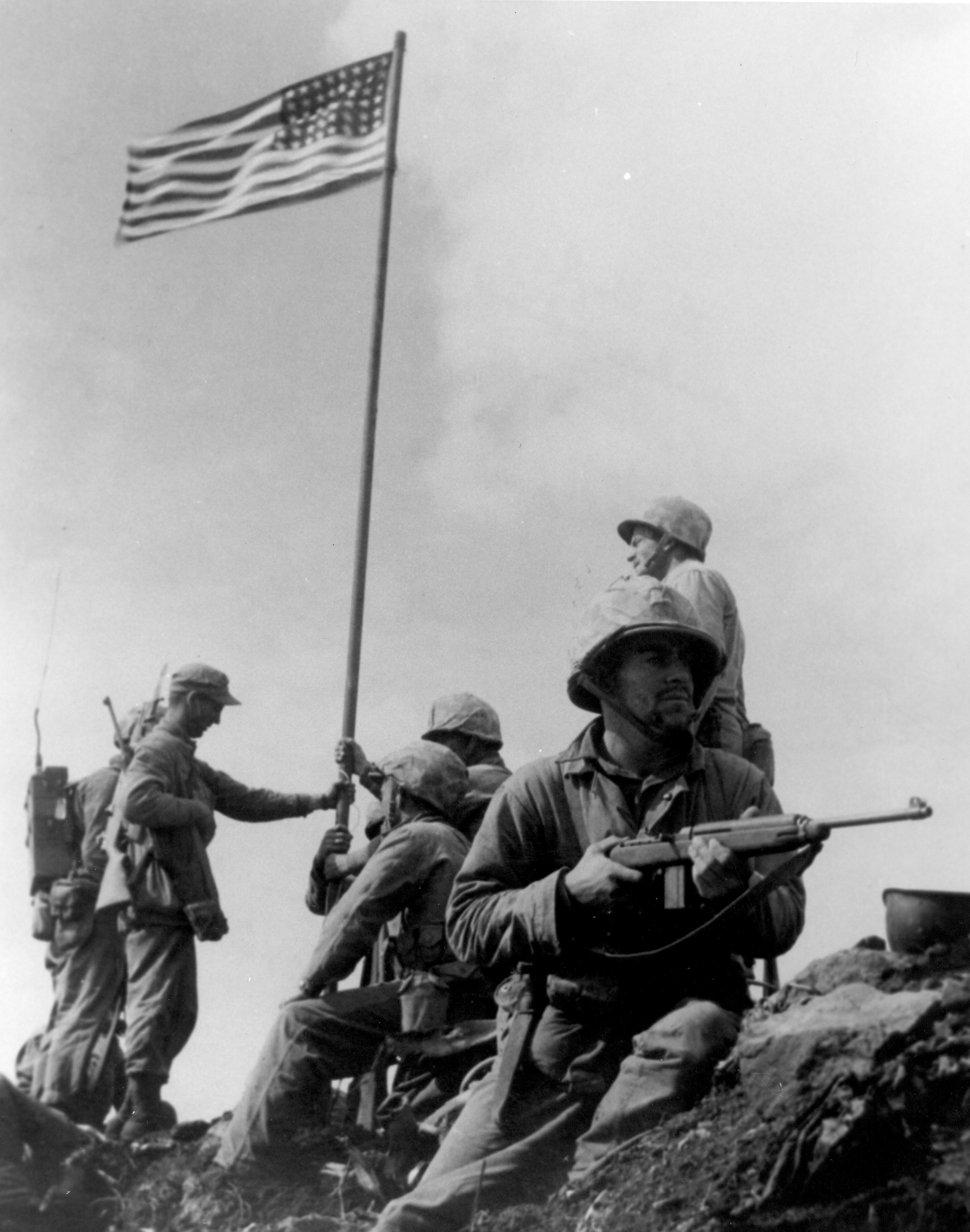
Marine Staff Sgt. Lou Lowery's photograph of the first U.S. flag on Mount Suribachi, after it was raised. Left to right: 1st Lt. Harold G. Schrier (left side of radioman), Pfc. Raymond Jacobs (radioman), Sgt. Henry Hansen (soft cap, holding flagstaff), Pvt. Phil Ward (holding lower flagstaff), Plt. Sgt. Ernest Thomas (seated), PhM2c. John Bradley, USN (standing above Pvt. Ward, holding flagstaff) Pfc. James Michels (holding M1 carbine), and Cpl. Charles W. Lindberg (standing above Michels).

Hansen volunteered for the Paramarines, which were formed in 1942, and became a Marine parachutist. He fought in the Bougainville Campaign in 1943. In February 1944, the Paramarines were disbanded and he was transferred to Third Platoon, Company E, 2nd Battalion, 28th Marines, 5th Marine Division at Camp Pendleton, California.

==== Battle of Iwo Jima ====
Hansen landed with the 5th marine Division on Iwo Jima, on February 19, 1945. He landed with his rifle company and battalion at the southern end of Iwo Jima where Mount Suribachi is located.

==== First flag-raising ====
On February 23, 1945, Lieutenant Colonel Chandler W. Johnson, commander of the 2nd Battalion, 28th Marine Regiment, ordered a platoon-size patrol to climb up 556-foot Mount Suribachi. Captain Dave Severance, E Company's commander, assembled the remainder of his Third Platoon and other members of the battalion headquarters including two Navy corpsmen and stretcher bearers. First Lieutenant Harold Schrier, E Company's executive officer, was handed the Second Battalion's American flag from Lt. Colonel Johnson (or the battalion adjutant); the flag measured 28 by 54 inches (137 by 71 cm) and had been taken from the attack transport USS Missoula (APA-211) on the way to Iwo Jima by First Lieutenant George G. Wells the Second Battalion's adjutant in charge of the battalion's flags. Lt. Schrier was to it take a patrol with the flag up the mountain and raise the flag if possible at the summit to signal that Mount Suribachi was captured and the top secure. At 8:30 a.m., Lt. Schrier started climbing with the patrol up the mountain. Less than an hour later, the patrol, after receiving occasional Japanese sniper fire, reached the rim of the volcano. After a brief firefight there, Lt. Schrier and his men captured the summit.

A section of a Japanese steel water pipe was found on the mountain and the battalion's flag Lt. Schrier carried was tied on to it by Lt. Schrier, Sgt. Hansen and Cpl. Charles Lindberg (Platoon Sergeant Ernest Thomas was watching inside the group with a grenade in his hand while Pvt. Phil Ward held the bottom of the pipe horizontally off the ground). The flagstaff was then carried to the highest part on the crater and raised by Lt. Schrier, Platoon Sgt. Thomas, Sgt. Hansen, and Cpl. Lindberg at approximately 10:30 a.m. Seeing the national colors flying caused loud cheering with some gunfire from the Marines, sailors, and Coast Guardsmen on the beach below and from the men on the ships near and docked at the beach; ships' whistles and horns sounded too. There were strong winds on Mount Suribachi, so Hansen, Pvt. Ward, and Third Platoon corpsman John Bradley helped make the flagstaff stay in a vertical position. The men at, around, and holding the flagstaff which included Schrier's radioman Raymond Jacobs (assigned to patrol from F Company), were photographed several times by Staff Sgt. Louis R. Lowery, a photographer with Leatherneck magazine who accompanied the patrol up the mountain. A firefight with some Japanese soldiers took place, and an enemy grenade caused Sgt. Lowery to fall several feet down the side of the crater, damaging his camera but not his film.

On February 24, Lt. Schrier ordered Plt. Sgt. Thomas to report early the next morning to Marine Lieutenant General Holland Smith aboard Navy Vice Admiral Richmond K. Turner's flagship the USS Eldorado (AGC-11) about the flag raising on Mount Suribachi. On February 25, Platoon Sgt. Thomas met with the two commanders and during an interview with a CBS news broadcaster aboard ship he named Lt. Schrier, Sgt. Hansen, and himself as the actual flag-raisers. Rosenthal's photograph of the second raising appeared in the newspapers the same day as Thomas's interview. Platoon Sgt. Thomas was killed on March 3 and Sgt. Hansen was killed on March 1.

==== Second flag-raising ====
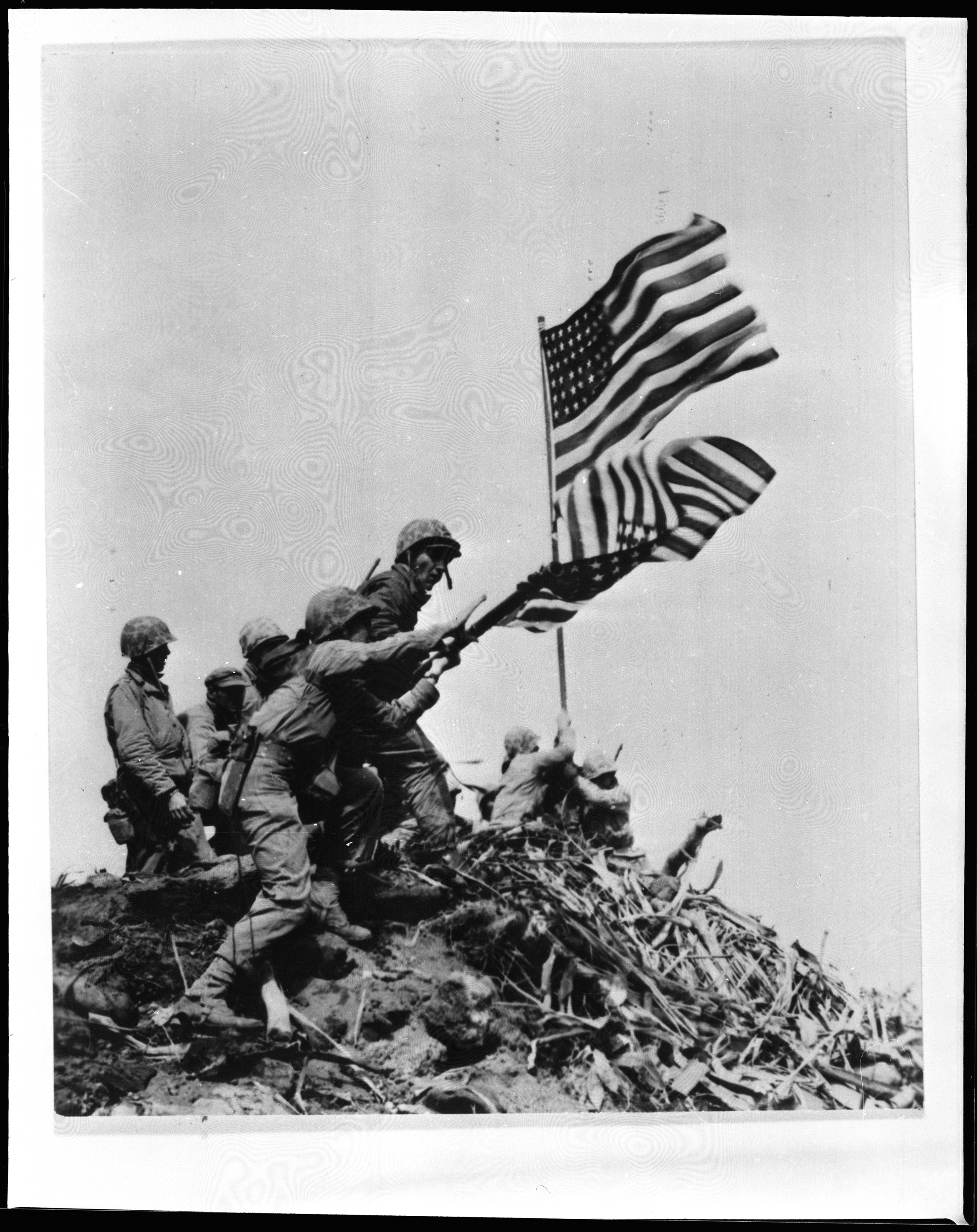
Marine Corps photo of the two flags on Mount Suribachi

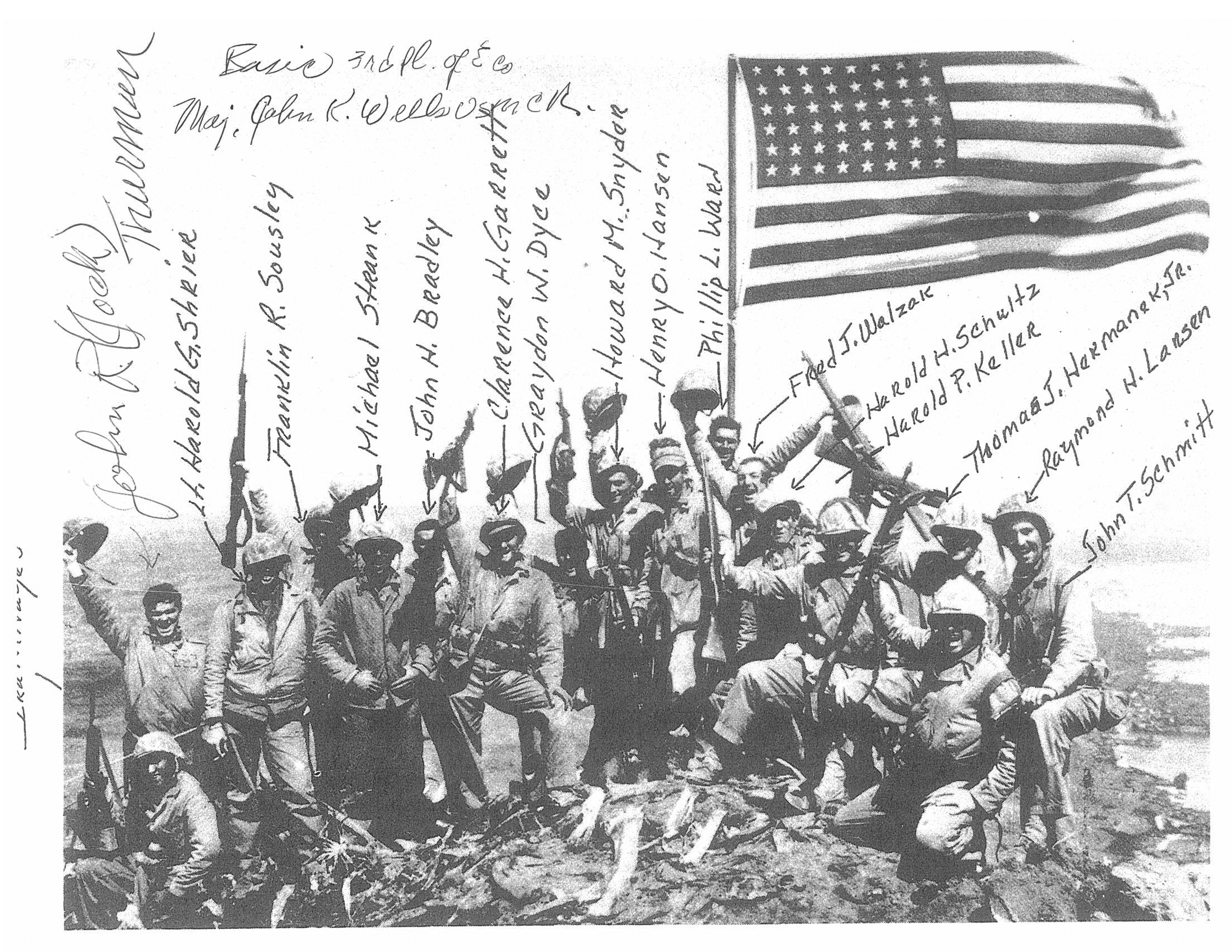
Joe Rosenthal's "Gung Ho" photo. Sgt. Hansen (soft cap), center

Lt. Col. Johnson determined that a larger flag should replace the original flag, which was too small to be seen on the north side of Mount Suribachi where thousands of Marines were fighting most of the Japanese. A 96 by 56 inch flag was obtained from a ship docked on shore and brought up to the top of Mount Suribachi by Pfc. Rene Gagnon, the Second Battalion's runner (messenger) for E Company. At the same time, Sgt. Michael Strank, Cpl. Harlon Block, Pfc. Franklin Sousley, and Pfc. Ira Hayes from Second Platoon, E Company, were sent to take communication wire (or supplies) up to the Third Platoon and raise the second flag. Once on top, the flag was attached to another Japanese steel pipe. Shortly before 1 p.m., Lt. Schrier ordered the second flag raised and the first flag lowered. The four Marines and Pfc. Harold Schultz and Pfc. Harold Keller (both members of Lt. Schrier's patrol) raised the larger flag at the same time three Marines and Pfc. Gagnon lowered the first flagstaff. Afterwards, Pfc. Gagnon removed the flag and took it down the mountain to the battalion adjutant.

The Marines who captured Mount Suribachi and those who raised the first flag generally did not receive national recognition even though the first flag raising had received some public recognition first. The black-and-white photograph of the second flag raising by Joe Rosenthal of the Associated Press became world-famous after appearing in the newspapers as the flag raising on Iwo Jima. Marine combat photographer Sergeant William Genaust, who had accompanied Rosenthal and Marine photographer Pvt. Robert Campbell up Mount Suribachi, filmed the second flag raising in color and it was used in newsreels. Other combat photographers ascended the mountain after the first flag was raised and the mountaintop secured. These photographers including Rosenthal and Pfc. George Burns an army photographer who was assigned to cover Marine amphibious landings for Yank Magazine, took photos of Marines (including Sgt. Hansen), corpsmen, and themselves around both of the flags. The second flag-raisers received national recognition. After the replacement flag was raised, sixteen Marines, including Schrier and Hansen, and two Navy corpsmen (John Bradley and Gerald Ziehme from the 40-man patrol) posed together for Rosenthal around the base of the flagstaff.

On March 14, an American flag was officially raised up a flagpole by orders of Lieutenant General Holland Smith at the V Amphibious Corps command post on the other side of Mount Suribachi where the 3rd Marine Division troops were located, and the second flag which was raised on February 23 on Mount Suribachi came down. Lt. Col. Johnson was killed in action on March 2. Sgt. Genaust was killed on March 4 in a Japanese cave on Iwo Jima, and his remains are still missing. Sgt. Strank and Cpl. Block were killed on March 1, and Pfc. Sousley was killed on March 21.

==== Death ====
Sgt. Hansen was killed in action on Iwo Jima on March 1. Sgt. Hansen, Platoon Sgt. Thomas, and the three second flag-raisers who were killed on Iwo Jima were buried in the 5th Marine Division cemetery on the island. The battle of Iwo Jima officially ended on March 26, 1945, and the next day the 28th Marines left the island for Hawaii. Hansen's final burial was at the National Memorial Cemetery of the Pacific near Honolulu on the island of Oahu in Hawaii.

== Second flag-raiser corrections ==
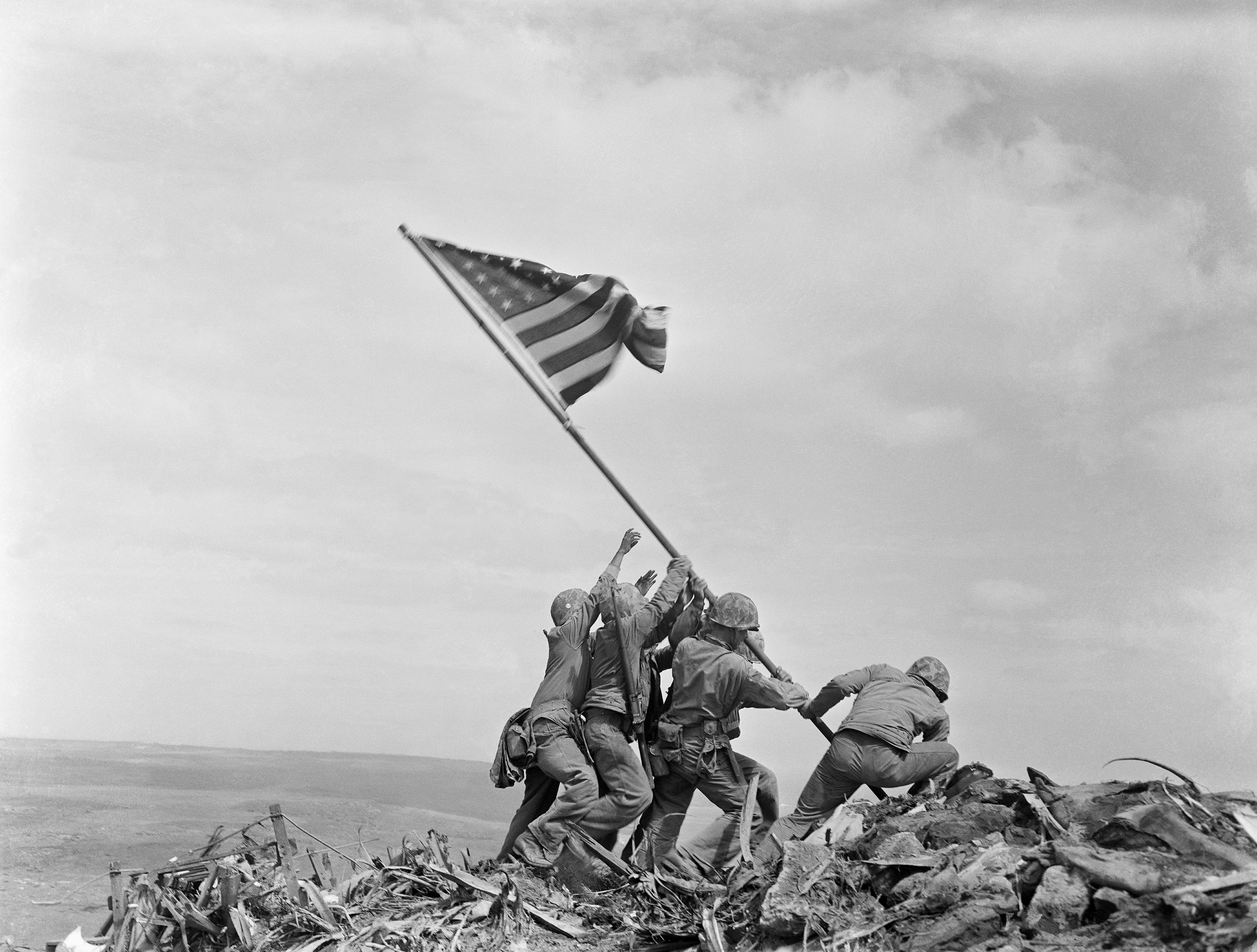
Second flag-raising photograph

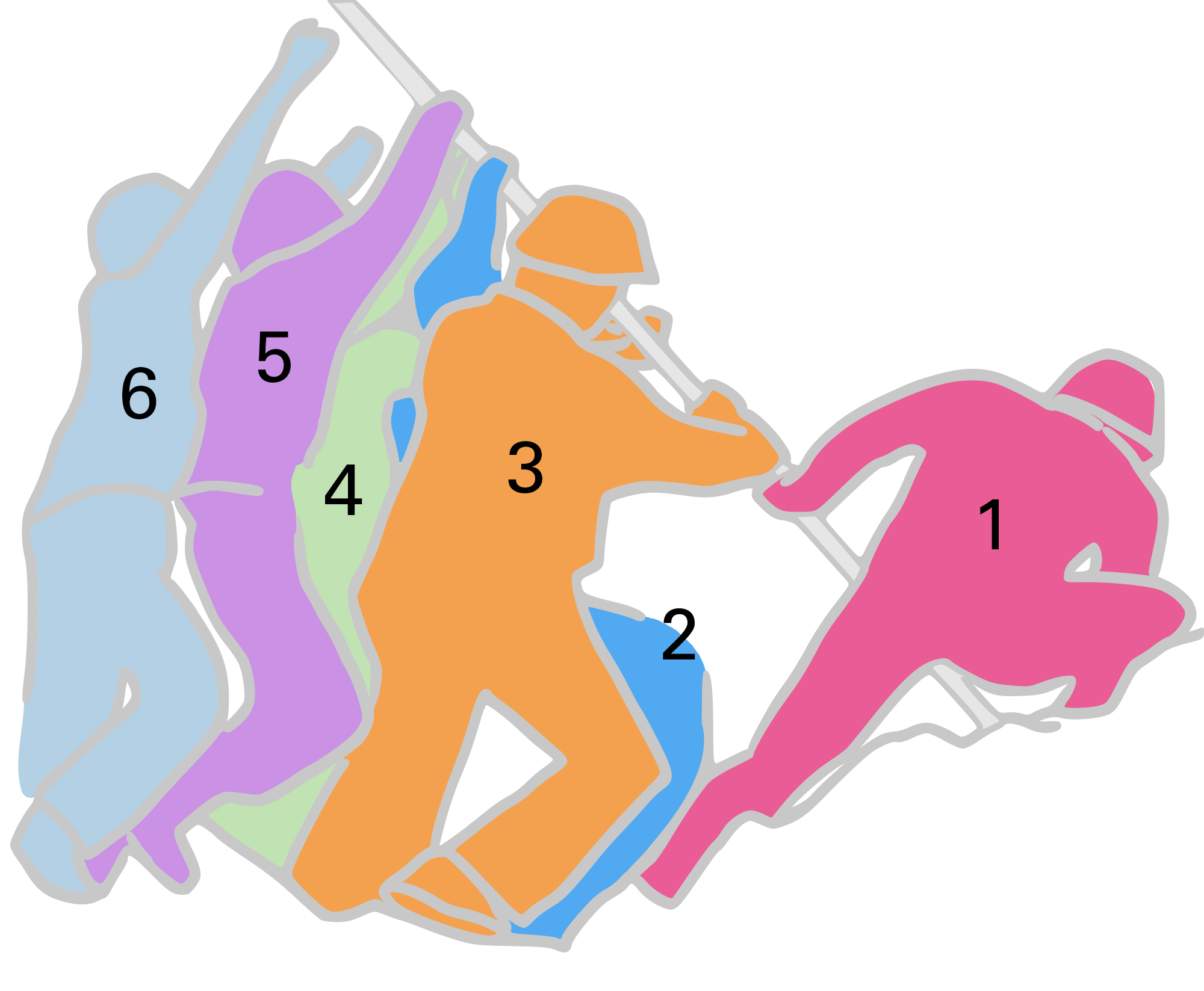
The six second flag-raisers: #1, Cpl. Harlon Block (KIA) #2, Pfc. Harold Keller #3, Pfc. Franklin Sousley (KIA) #4, Sgt. Michael Strank (KIA) #5, Pfc. Harold Schultz #6, Pfc. Ira Hayes

On March 20, 1945, President Roosevelt ordered the flag-raisers in Rosenthal's photograph to Washington D.C. after the battle. Pfc. Gagnon was ordered to Marine Headquarters in Washington on April 3 and arrived on April 7. He was questioned the same day by a Marine public information officer about the identities of the six flag raisers in the photograph. Gagnon identified the six flag raisers as Sgt. Strank, Pfc. Sousley, Navy corpsman John Bradley, Pfc. Ira Hayes, and Sgt. Henry Hansen, and himself. He also said Sgt. Strank, Sgt. Hansen, and Pfc. Sousley were killed on Iwo Jima. After Pfc. Gagnon was questioned, Pfc. Hayes and PhM2c. Bradley were ordered to Marine Headquarters in Washington D.C. Bradley, who was recovering from his wounds at Oakland Naval Hospital in Oakland, California, was transferred to Bethesda Naval Hospital at Bethesda, Maryland, where he was shown Rosenthal's flag-raising photograph and was told he was in it. Both Bradley (on crutches) and Hayes arrived in Washington on April 19. They both reported to the same Marine officer as Pfc. Gagnon and were questioned separately. Bradley agreed with all of the identities of the flag-raisers named by Gagnon in the photograph including his own. Pfc. Hayes agreed with all of the identities named by Pfc. Gagnon except Sgt. Hansen, who was at the base of the flagstaff in the photo. Hayes said that person was Cpl. Block. The Marine lieutenant colonel told Pfc. Hayes that the identities were made public on April 8 and would not be changed, and to not say anything about it anymore (the officer later denied that Pfc. Hayes ever told him that Cpl. Block was in the photograph).

A Marine Corps investigation of the identities of the six second flag-raisers began in December 1946 and concluded in January 1947 that it was Cpl. Block and not Sgt. Hansen at the base of the flagstaff in the Rosenthal photograph, and that no blame was to be placed on anyone in this matter. The identities of the other five second flag-raisers were confirmed.

The Marine Corps review board looked once more into the identities of the six second flag-raisers in Rosenthal's photograph, this time concluding in June 2016 that Harold Schultz was in the photograph and John Bradley was not. Franklin Sousley, not Schultz, is now in the position initially ascribed to Bradley (fourth from left) in the photograph and Schultz is now in Sousley's former position (second from left) in the photograph. The identities of the other five flag-raisers were confirmed. Schultz did not ever say publicly that he was a flag-raiser or in the photograph.

A third Marine Corps investigation into the identities of the six second flag-raisers concluded in October 2019, that Harold Keller was in the Rosenthal's photograph in place of Rene Gagnon (fifth from left). Gagnon who carried the larger second flag up Mount Suribachi, helped lower the first flagstaff and removed the first flag at the time the second flag was raised. The identities of the other five flag raisers were confirmed. Like Schultz, Keller did not ever say publicly he was a flag-raiser or that he was in the photograph.

== Marine Corps War Memorial ==
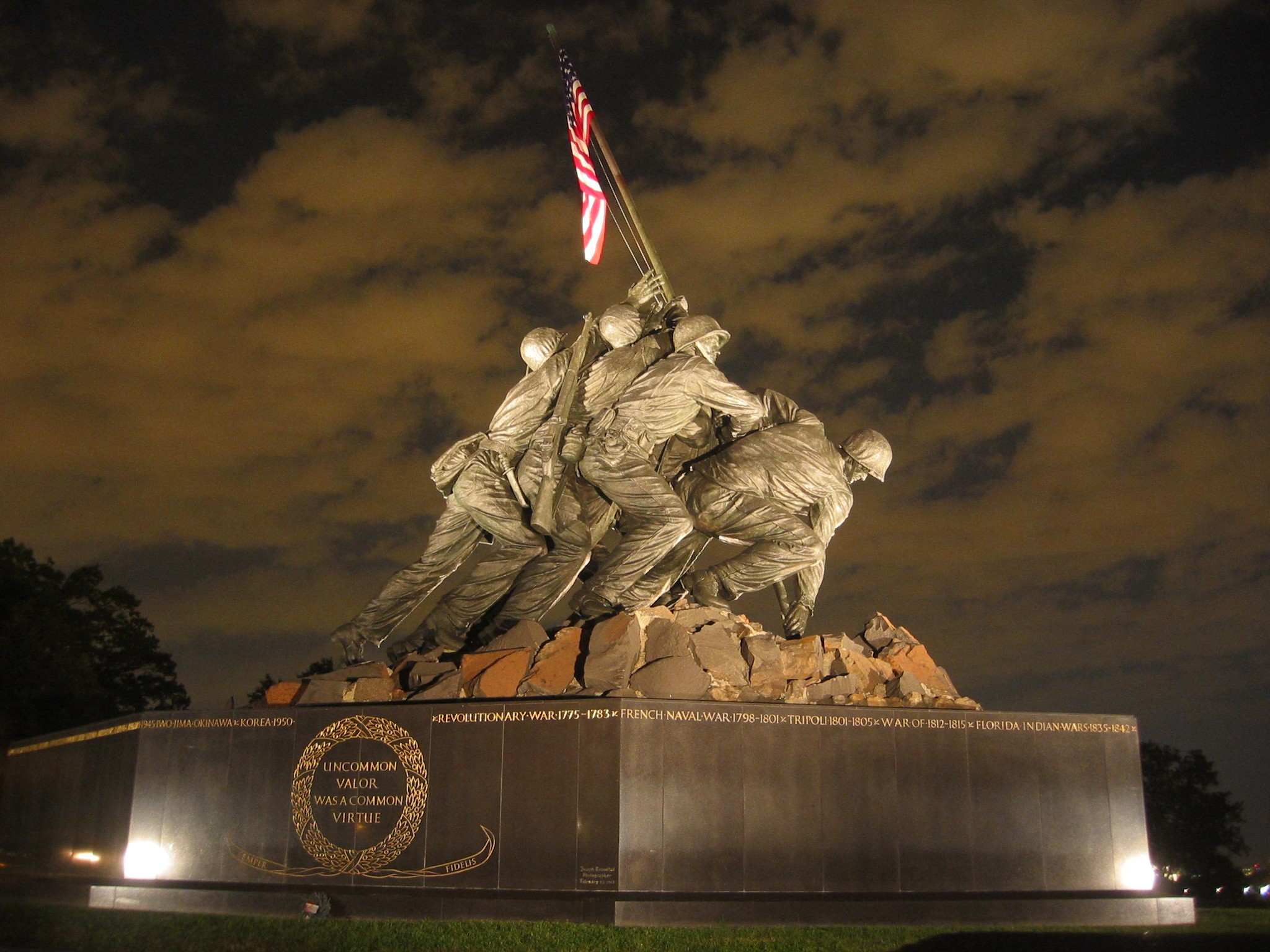
The U.S. Marine Corps War Memorial in Arlington, Virginia

The Marine Corps War Memorial (also known as the Iwo Jima Memorial) in Arlington, Virginia, which was inspired by Joe Rosenthal's photograph of the second flag-raising on Mount Suribachi by six Marines on February 23, 1945, was dedicated on November 10, 1954 (179th anniversary of the Marine Corps). Harold Schrier, Charles Lindberg, and Lou Lowery, from the patrol that raised the first flag on Mount Suribachi, attended the dedication ceremony as guests.

President Dwight D. Eisenhower sat upfront during the dedication ceremony with Vice President Richard Nixon, Secretary of Defense Charles E. Wilson, Deputy Secretary of Defense Robert Anderson, and General Lemuel C. Shepherd, the 20th Commandant of the Marine Corps. Ira Hayes, one of the three surviving flag raisers depicted on the monument, was also seated upfront with John Bradley (incorrectly identified as a flag raiser until June 2016), Rene Gagnon (incorrectly identified as a flag raiser until October 16, 2019), Mrs Martha Strank, Mrs. Ada Belle Block, and Mrs. Goldie Price (mother of Franklin Sousley). Those giving remarks at the dedication included Robert Anderson, Chairman of Day; Colonel J.W. Moreau, U.S. Marine Corps (Retired), President, Marine Corps War Memorial Foundation; General Shepherd, who presented the memorial to the American people; Felix de Weldon, sculptor; and Richard Nixon, who gave the dedication address. Inscribed on the memorial are the following words:

In Honor And Memory Of The Men of The United States Marine Corps Who Have Given Their Lives To Their Country Since 10 November 1775

== Military awards ==
Hansen's military decorations and awards include:

Purple Heart
Combat Action Ribbon
Navy Presidential Unit Citation with 5/16" silver participation star
Marine Corps Good Conduct Medal
American Defense Service Medal
American Campaign Medal
Asiatic-Pacific Campaign Medal with two bronze campaign stars
World War II Victory Medal

- Parachutist Badge (silver type)
- Sharpshooter Badge (Rifle)

== Public recognition ==
Sergeant Henry O. Hansen Park, in his hometown of Somerville, was named in his honor in June 2004.

== Portrayal in film ==
Hank Hansen is featured in the 2006 Clint Eastwood movie Flags of Our Fathers, where he is played by American actor Paul Walker. The movie is based on the book of the same title.

== See also ==
- Shadow of Suribachi: Raising The Flags on Iwo Jima
- Flags of Our Fathers
