= Harry L. Hansen =

American business professor (1911–1992)

Harry L. Hansen (21 October 1911, New York City - 3 August 1992, Cambridge Massachusetts) was a pioneer of management education.

He studied at Haverford College in 1933, and continued on at Harvard Graduate School of Business Administration to earn his master's degree in 1935, and a doctorate in 1939.

In 1949 Hensen became a full professor at Harvard, and 1965 he was the inaugural Malcolm P. McNair Professor of Marketing. He stayed at Harvard until 1977.

After his years at Harvard, he took the position of dean of Institut pour l'Etude des Methodes de Direction de l'Entreprise in Lausanne, Switzerland until 1981, and then became a distinguished professor at IESE Business School in Barcelona, Spain.

In 1985 he received the Benjamin Franklin Medal of the Royal Society of Arts, and received Harvard's Distinguished Service Award, its highest honour.

== Archives and records ==
- Harry L. Hansen papers at Baker Library Special Collections, Harvard Business School.
