= Shadow of Suribachi =

Shadow of Suribachi: Raising the Flags on Iwo Jima
- Author: Parker Bishop Albee, Jr. Keller Cushing Freeman
- Cover artist: Joe Rosenthal (photograph: Raising the Flag on Iwo Jima)
- Language: English
- Genre: Military history
- Publisher: Praeger Publishers
- Publication date: 1995
- Publication place: United States
- Media type: Print Hardcover
- Pages: 174 pp (first edition, hardcover)
- ISBN: 0-275-95063-8 (first edition, hardcover)
- OCLC: 31010773
- Dewey Decimal: 940.54/2528 22
- LC Class: D767.99.I9 A4 1995

Shadow of Suribachi: Raising The Flags on Iwo Jima (1995) is a book released during the 50th anniversary of the flag-raising(s) atop Mount Suribachi on Iwo Jima during World War II which was written by Parker Bishop Albee, Jr. and Keller Cushing Freeman. The book mainly examines the controversy over the identification of the flag-raiser who was positioned at the base of the flagpole in Joe Rosenthal's Raising the Flag on Iwo Jima photograph of the second flag-raising on February 23, 1945.

== Overview ==
The authors examine various staging myths about Rosenthal's photograph of six men raising the flag on Iwo Jima. Much of the book is devoted to the story of Sergeant Hank Hansen who was initially identified as one of these men and became the model for one of the six figures in the Marine Corps War Memorial. Hansen was a member of the 40-man combat patrol mostly from Third Platoon, E Company, 28th Marines, that raised the first of two flags on the summit of Mount Suribachi on February 23, 1945. After the battle of Iwo Jima, Hansen was incorrectly identified as a flag-raiser by E Company's runner, Rene Gagnon, who was also identified as a second flag-raiser. E Company's Third Platoon corpsman, John Bradley (incorrectly identified as a second flag-raiser), also misidentified Hansen. Marine Ira Hayes was the only second flag-raiser who correctly identified Corporal Harlon Block, who was officially recognized as a second flag-raiser in January 1947.

== Ira Hayes questions misidentification ==
Among the topics discussed in the book is the struggle by Ira Hayes (a surviving second-flag-raiser) to correctly identify Corporal Harlon Block as one of the second flag-raisers. Block was misidentified as Hansen in Rosenthal's photograph. Both Block and Hansen were killed on Iwo Jima on March 1, 1945. In April 1945 Hayes, Gagnon and Bradley were returned to the United States and interviewed by a Marine Corps lieutenant colonel about the flag-raising before embarking on a cross-country war bond drive tour. Hayes tried to raise the issue of the error in identifying Block. He was told that Block had already been identified publicly as flag-raisers by the Marine Corps on April 8, and that since both men had died the matter was considered closed. The 7th War Loan Drive began on 11 May and the trio visited 33 American cities to sell war bonds, but Hayes was ordered back to E Company in Hawaii on April 24. The tour continued without him until July 4.

Hayes' story as presented in the book differs from that of other biographers as they transcribe a letter which Hayes replied to a letter sent to him by Harlon's mother Belle on July 12, 1946, confirming it was her son Harlon in the photograph. The authors do not mention Hayes hitchhiking to Texas to tell them the truth, a feature of other Hayes biographies. When Belle Block sent Hayes' letter to her congressman through Mr. Block in September 1946 he requested the Marine Corps investigate the identification. Hayes supplied an affidavit listing the names of six men he believed to be the second flag-raisers (including at that time John Bradley and Rene Gagnon). The Marine Corps launched an investigation on December 4, 1946 and concluded that it was actually Block and not Hansen in Rosenthal's photograph. The report listed significant uniform discrepancies between the figure in the photograph and that of Hansen in photographs taken earlier that day, including Rosenthal's "Gung Ho" photograph taken moments after the second flag-raising.

Before seeing Hayes' hand-written notes and identifications on the photographs, both Gagnon and Bradley sent notarized statements reaffirming their earlier identification of Hansen. After being shown Hayes' material, Bradley wrote a letter to the investigators which he ended by saying, "...it could be Block." Hayes' material and Bradley's letter were then sent to Gagnon, who, according to this book, gave in and acquiesced in a letter, the first paragraph of which was copied word-for-word from Bradley's.

== Conclusion ==
On January 15, 1947, the Marine Corps appointed investigating board found that the figure at the base of the flagpole in the photograph had been "incorrectly identified since April 8, 1945, as being Sergeant Henry O. Hansen." Furthermore, they stated that "to the best of the ability of the Board to determine at this time, the above-mentioned figure is that of Corporal Harlan [sic] H. Block."

Albee and Freeman concluded that it was ultimately impossible to tell, based only on the photographic evidence, who was at the base of the flagpole.
