= Sands of Iwo Jima =

1949 film

- Original film poster
- Directed by: Allan Dwan
- Written by: Harry Brown; James Edward Grant
- Produced by: Herbert Yates
- Starring: John Wayne; John Agar; Adele Mara; Forrest Tucker; Wally Cassell; James Brown; Richard Webb; Arthur Franz; Julie Bishop; James Holden; Peter Coe; Richard Jaeckel
- Cinematography: Reggie Lanning
- Edited by: Richard L. Van Enger
- Music by: Victor Young
- Production company: Republic Pictures
- Distributed by: Republic Pictures
- Release dates: December 14, 1949 (San Francisco, premiere)
- Running time: 100 minutes; 109 minutes
- Country: United States
- Language: English
- Budget: $1,397,558
- Box office: $4 million (US/Canada rentals) or $4,227,407 (as at 27 March 1953)

Sands of Iwo Jima is a 1949 war film starring John Wayne that follows a group of United States Marines from training to the Battle of Iwo Jima during World War II. The film, which also features John Agar, Adele Mara and Forrest Tucker, was written by Harry Brown and James Edward Grant, and directed by Allan Dwan. The picture was a Republic Pictures production.

Sands of Iwo Jima was nominated for Academy Awards for Best Actor in a Leading Role (John Wayne), Best Film Editing, Best Sound Recording (Daniel J. Bloomberg) and Best Writing, Motion Picture Story.

== Plot ==
Corporal Robert Dunne recounts the story of tough-as-nails career Marine Sergeant John Stryker. Initially he is greatly disliked by the men of his squad, particularly the combat replacements, for the rigorous training he puts them through. He is especially despised by PFC Peter "Pete" Conway, the arrogant, college-educated son of Colonel Sam Conway (whom Stryker served under until the Colonel's death on Guadalcanal, and admired), and PFC Al Thomas who blames Stryker for his demotion. While the unit is in New Zealand, Conway marries Allison Bromley before the unit goes to Tarawa. Stryker, whose wife left him years ago and took custody of their son, drinks himself to submission and has to be saved from a naval shore patrol by his men.

When Stryker leads his squad in the invasion of Tarawa, the men begin to appreciate his methods. The platoon commander, Lieutenant Baker, is killed seconds after he lands on the beach, and PFCs "Farmer" Soames and "Ski" Choynski are wounded. The Marines are pinned down by a pillbox. Several more men, including PFC Shipley, are killed before Stryker is able to demolish the pillbox with a satchel charge. Fighting inland, Hellenopolis is killed and Bass is badly wounded when they send Thomas back for ammunition, and he fails to return before they run out. On their first night, the squad is ordered to dig in and hold their positions. Alone in no-man's-land, Bass begs for help. Conway considers Stryker brutal and unfeeling when he refuses to disobey orders and go to Bass's rescue. When Stryker discovers Thomas's dereliction after the battle, he provokes a fistfight with him. A passing officer spots this serious offense, but Thomas claims that Stryker was merely teaching him judo. A guilt-ridden Thomas abjectly apologizes to Stryker, admitting he stopped for coffee with the mortarmen while the others were fighting.

Stryker reveals a softer side while on leave in Honolulu. He picks up a bargirl and discovers she has a hungry baby boy in her apartment. Stryker gives the woman some money and leaves. During a training exercise, McHugh, a replacement, drops a live hand grenade. Conway, distracted reading a letter from his wife, fails to take cover and Stryker knocks him down, saving his life, then bawls him out in front of the platoon.

Stryker and his squad deploy to the battle of Iwo Jima where they suffer heavy casualties during the landing. McHugh and PFC Harris are killed, and Soames and Frank Flynn wounded. Stryker's squad joins a 40-man patrol assigned to charge up Mount Suribachi. Conway, who has frequently expressed fears that he is going to die himself, saves Stryker from being killed by a surprise attack, then tells Stryker he's naming his new baby son Sam, his father's name. Stryker smiles and says a Navy Cross winner's name is good enough for the boy. During the charge up the hill, Eddie Flynn, Stein, and Fowler are killed.

Resting during a lull in the fighting, Stryker says he has never been better, and is suddenly shot dead by a Japanese soldier emerging from a spider hole. Bass kills the soldier. The surviving squad members find a letter Stryker wrote but never sent to his son, expressing emotions he wanted to reveal but never could. The squad watches the flag raising on Iwo Jima and Conway, who has promised to finish Stryker's letter, echoes his iconic words "Saddle up", and leads the men back into the war.

== Cast ==
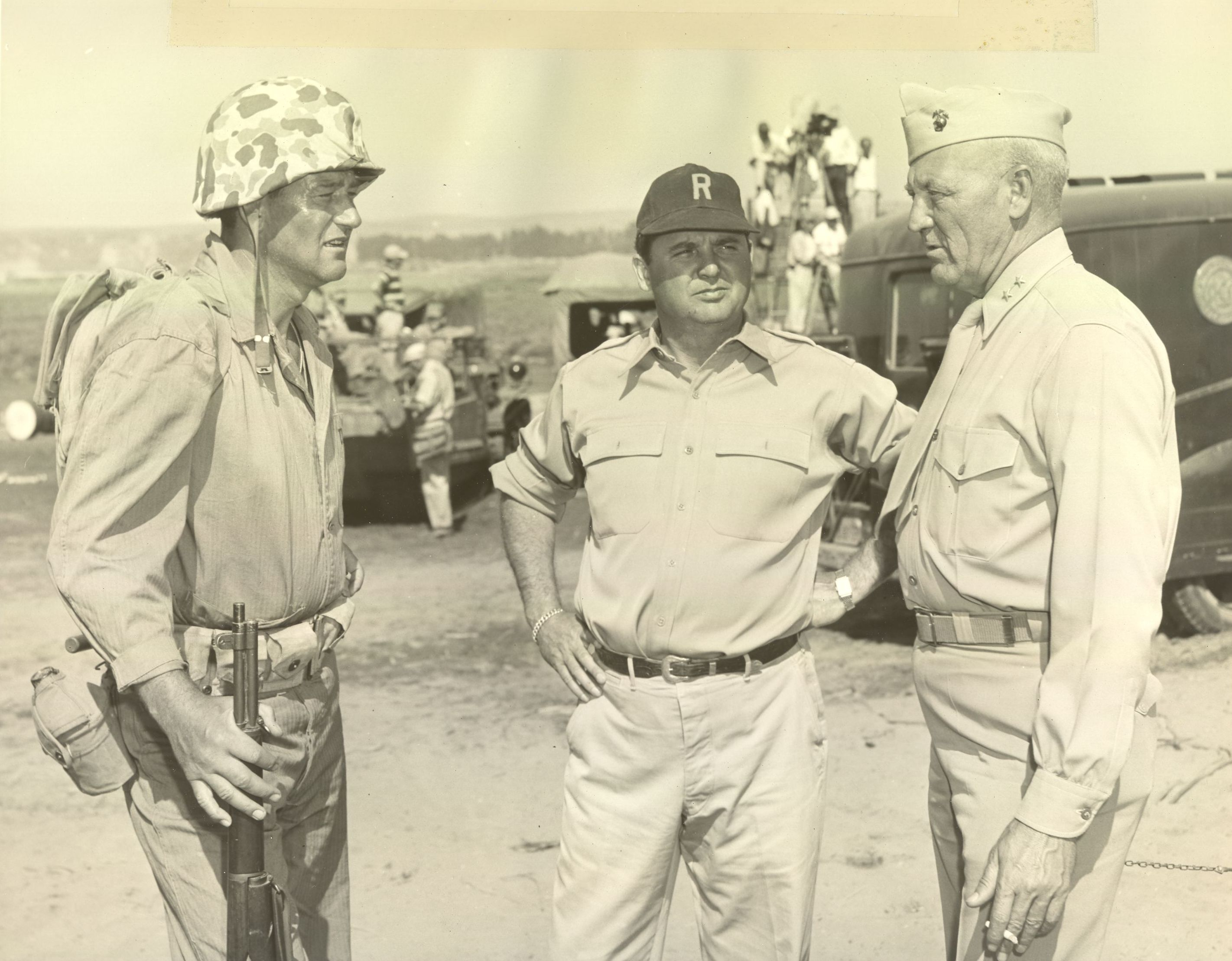
John Wayne speaks to the film's technical advisors Tarawa veteran and Medal of Honor recipient, Colonel David M. Shoup (center), and Battle of Iwo Jima commander, General Graves B. Erskine (right).

- John Wayne as Sgt. John M. Stryker
- John Agar as PFC Peter T. "Pete" Conway
- Adele Mara as Allison Bromley
- Forrest Tucker as PFC Al J. Thomas
- Wally Cassell as PFC Benny A. Regazzi
- James Brown as PFC Charlie Bass
- Richard Webb as PFC "Handsome" Dan Shipley
- Arthur Franz as Corporal Robert C. Dunne/Narrator
- Julie Bishop as Mary (the bargirl)
- James Holden as PFC "Farmer" Soames
- Peter Coe as PFC George Hellenopolis
- Richard Jaeckel as PFC Frank Flynn
- William Murphy as PFC Eddie Flynn
- Martin Milner as Pvt Mike McHugh
- George Tyne as PFC Hart S. Harris
- Hal Baylor as Pvt J.E. "Ski" Choynski (credited as Hal Fieberling)
- Leonard Gumley as Pvt Sid Stein
- Ira Hayes as himself raising the flag
- John Bradley as himself raising the flag
- Rene Gagnon as himself raising the flag
- William Self as Pvt L.D. Fowler Jr.
- John McGuire as Captain Joyce

== Production ==
=== Writing ===
The film was based on a screenplay by Harry Brown and James Edward Grant from a story by Harry Brown.

The script is the first known work to use the military idiom "lock and load", an expression meaning "get ready to fight". Although the original use and implied meaning are disputed, it typically described the action of arming an M1 Garand rifle by first locking the bolt back by pulling the charging handle rearward and then loading an 8-round clip into its magazine.

=== Casting ===
The production used actual combat veterans from Iwo Jima in the film. The three survivors of the five Marines (Rene Gagnon, and Ira Hayes) and a Navy corpsman (John Bradley) who were credited with raising the second flag on Mount Suribachi during the actual battle appear briefly in the film just before the flag raising scene. Hayes was made the subject of a film biography, The Outsider, and Bradley the subject of a book by his son James, Flags of Our Fathers. Subsequent research has established that the figures identified in the flag raising photograph as Bradley and Gagnon were actually Marine PFC Harold Schultz and Marine Cpl Harold Keller.

Also appearing as themselves are 1st Lt. Harold Schrier, who led the flag-raising patrol up Mount Suribachi on Iwo Jima and helped raise the first flag, Col. David M. Shoup, later Commandant of the Marine Corps and recipient of the Medal of Honor at Tarawa, and Lt. Col. Henry P. "Jim" Crowe, commander of the 2nd Battalion 8th Marines at Tarawa, where he earned the U.S. Navy Cross. Additionally, "nearly 2,000 Marines were used as extras" during filming.

The cast of John Wayne, John Agar, Forrest Tucker, and Richard Jaeckel would reunite in the 1970 western Chisum .

=== Filming ===
The movie was made on location in California. Scenes were filmed at the Marine Corps Base at Camp Pendleton, Leo Carrillo State Beach, Santa Catalina Island, Channel Islands, Janss Conejo Ranch, Thousand Oaks, Republic Studios and Universal Studios. Actual combat footage from the Pacific War was also used in the film.

== Reception ==
In a lukewarm review for The New York Times, Thomas M. Pryor praised the portrayal of the dread the men felt on the eve of battle and the inter-cutting of newsreel footage with dramatized action as "undeniable moments of greatness," but wrote that, despite Wayne's "honest and convincing" performance, the clichéd personal conflicts and idiosyncrasies of the screenplay's poorly drawn characters diminished what "easily could have been a great war film instead of just a good one."

The film received four nominations at the 22nd Academy Awards, including John Wayne for Best Actor, his first nomination in the category. It won no awards. A sequel to the film starring Wayne, called Devil Birds, was planned but never materialized.

On the review aggregator website Rotten Tomatoes, 100% of 13 critics' reviews are positive. Metacritic, which uses a weighted average, assigned the film a score of 75 out of 100, based on 8 critics, indicating "generally favorable" reviews.

== In popular culture ==
In the television show King of the Hill (1997–2010), this is the favorite film of Cotton Hill, father of main character Hank Hill. Hank recalls that, during his childhood, his father would travel around Texas searching for showings of this film.

The episode "Call of Silence" (2004) in NCIS's season 2 references the film and a documentary as shared background to Marine history and legacy. The episode shows the NCIS character Timothy McGee watching the documentary To the Shores of Iwo Jima; the character Anthony DiNozzo approaches and, in furtherance of the character's schtick as an avowed and knowledgeable movie buff, begins talking about the theatrical film Sands of Iwo Jima, some scenes of which were taken from the documentary.

The Southern rock band Drive-By Truckers have a song title "The Sands of Iwo Jima" on their 2004 album The Dirty South. It is sung from the perspective of a young boy who has been exposed to World War II through old John Wayne movies. He asks his great-uncle, a World War II veteran, if The Sands of Iwo Jima represents the war properly; the old man smiles, shakes his head and responds, "I never saw John Wayne on the sands of Iwo Jima."

== See also ==
- John Wayne filmography
