= Ralph Ignatowski =

United States Marine Corps private

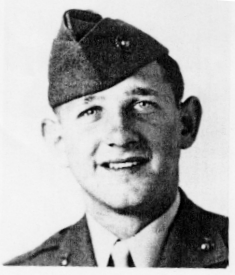
- Born: Ralph Anthony Ignatowski; April 8, 1926; Milwaukee, Wisconsin, U.S.
- Died: March 7, 1945 (aged 18); KIA on Iwo Jima, Japan
- Burial place: Rock Island National Cemetery, Rock Island, Illinois
- Military career
- Allegiance: United States
- Branch: United States Marine Corps
- Service years: 1943–1945
- Rank: Private
- Nickname: "Iggy"
- Unit: 2nd Battalion, 28th Marines
- Conflicts: World War II: Battle of Iwo Jima
- Awards: Purple Heart (2); Combat Action Ribbon; Presidential Unit Citation

Ralph Anthony "Iggy" Ignatowski (April 8, 1926 – March 7, 1945) was a United States Marine Corps private who was captured and killed by the Japanese in the Battle of Iwo Jima during World War II. He was a member of the Marine rifle company platoon who climbed to the top of Mount Suribachi and raised the American flag on February 23, 1945.

== Biography ==
Ralph Ignatowski was born in Milwaukee, Wisconsin, to Polish-born Walter Ignatowski and a German mother, the former Frances Thomas.

=== U.S. Marine Corps ===
==== World War II ====
Ignatowski failed the physical examination when he first tried to enlist in the Marine Corps in 1943. However, he tried again, taking a friend's urine sample with him and this time passed the physical. In 1944, after "boot" camp training, he was assigned to 3rd Platoon, E Company, 2nd Battalion, 28th Marine Regiment, 5th Marine Division.

He became a close friend with one of his platoon's Navy corpsmen, John "Doc" Bradley, who was with Ignatowski on the battlefield just before he was captured on Iwo Jima. For more than 70 years, Bradley was considered to be one of the six persons who raised the American flag on top of Mount Suribachi in Joe Rosenthal's photo Raising the flag on Iwo Jima when he was not (on June 23, 2016, the Marine Corps announced that John Bradley was not in the famous flag-raising photo); he was involved with helping to secure both the flag's flagstaffs put up on windy Mount Suribachi on February 23, 1945.

==== Military records ====
Private Ignatowski was aboard the USS Missoula at sea on February 5, 1945, and arrived at Eniwetok Atoll, Marshall Islands on February 7. Ignatowski was at sea again from February 8 to 10, and disembarked at Saipan, Marianas Islands, on February 11. Ignatowski boarded USS LST-481 and sailed to Iwo Jima from February 11 to 18. Ignatowski, E Company, 28th Marines, arrived at Iwo Jima on February 19. Ignatowski was wounded by shrapnel in the jaw on February 20, 1945, and returned to duty the same day.

On March 4, 1945, Ignatowski was seen captured and taken into a cave by Japanese soldiers and about 2 hours later, the deceased body of Second Lieutenant Leonard Sokol E/2d/28th Regiment was taken away at same location by Japanese soldiers. On March 7, 1945, both their bodies were found. The following entries from the 28th Marine Regiment records describe the timeline of their deaths:

- Mar 4, 1845 hrs – Fr LT228 – One P.F.C. from Easy Co, name unknown, believed captured by Japs in vicinity of Hill 215.
- Mar 4, 2030 hrs – Fr LT228 – Lt. Sokol was killed at 1330 at 233 X and body taken by Nips – No maps or shackle codes known to be on his person according to Capt Severance.
- Mar 4, 2100 hrs – Fr LT 228 – All quiet – Easy Co. reports Japs were definitely seen grabbing man into cave near where Lt. Sokol's body disappeared.
- Mar 7, 1900 hrs – Fr. LT228 – Body of captured PFC from "E" Co (Ignatowski) had apparently been searched (pack emptied) and tortured – arm broken, body beaten. Location 450 yds north of tip of Hill 362. Forward and left of E Co's present CP – Lt. Sokol's body nearby mutilated by one of our own flame throwers.
- Mar 7, 1940 hrs – Fr D2 – Corps requests written statements from men in "E" Co who saw Ignatowski captured.
- Mar 8, 0855 hrs – Fr 5th Div. Red Cross – Request details on capture of PFC Ignatowsky "E" Co. Call Mr. Thomas c/o Columbus #1
- Mar 8, 1010 hrs – Fr LT228 – Ignatowski body evacuated with Lt. Sokol's. En route, via Regt.
- Mar 8, 1150 hrs – To D2 – Requested Regimental ARC representative and Regimental Surgeon examine body of P.F.C. Ignatowski and prepare affidavits.
- Mar 9, 1154 hrs – Fr D2 – Requests detail re Ignatowski and statements: a. Circumstances of capture b. Events intervening between capture and recovery. c. Circumstances of recovery of body.

==== Death ====
Although the exact circumstances are uncertain, Ignatowski was taken prisoner of war by Japanese troops, tortured, killed, and mutilated. Whether he was mutilated alive or not is unknown.

Ignatowski's death is referenced in several books:

- In his book Semper Chai!: Marines of Blue and White (and Red) about Jews in the U.S. Marine Corps, author Howard J. Leavitt collected eyewitness reports regarding the actual circumstances of Ignatowski and Sokol's deaths, including a letter to the surviving members of the family of Lieutenant Sokol by fellow Marine James Buchanan:

"On March 3, Private Ralph Ignatowski was somehow dragged into a cave within a small canyon. What I tell you next is what I heard but did not see. Lieutenant Sokol may have tried to rescue Ignatowski, but I don't know for sure.”

“I walked into the canyon and found Lieutenant Sokol on a road, Ralph Ignatowski close behind. An officer approached me and said, 'Don't touch them. We may have an atrocity here.' I understand Ralph had been bayoneted numerous times; some punctures bled, some did not.”

- Ignatowski's death is also mentioned in the book Flags of Our Fathers, coauthored by the son of first flag raiser John Bradley. The following are his recollections of Ignatowski's death:

"I have tried so hard to block this out. To forget it. We could choose a buddy to go in with. My buddy was a guy from Milwaukee. We were pinned down in one area. Someone elsewhere fell injured and I ran to help out, and when I came back my buddy was gone. I couldn't figure out where he was. I could see all around, but he wasn't there. And nobody knew where he was.

A few days later someone yelled that they'd found him. They called me over because I was a corpsman. The Japanese had pulled him underground and tortured him. His fingernails... his tongue... It was terrible. I've tried hard to forget all this."

Many years later, in researching my father's life, I asked Cliff Langley, Doc's co-corpsman, about the discovery of Iggy's body. Langley told me it looked to him as though Ralph Ignatowski had endured just about every variety of physical cruelty imaginable.

"Both his arms were fractured," Langley said. "They just hung there, there like arms on a broken doll. He had been bayoneted repeatedly. The back of his head had been smashed in."

Other eyewitness reports further indicated that Ignatowski had been tortured in the cave by the Japanese for three days, during which time they also cut out his eyes, cut off his ears, smashed in his teeth and skull. He had several wounds to his stomach, which had been repeatedly stabbed with a bayonet. As a final insult, his genitalia was severed and stuffed into his mouth.

==== Burial ====
Ignatowski's remains were initially interred with military honors in Grave 1201, Row 11, Plot 5, 5th Marine Division Cemetery, Iwo Jima. In 1949, his body was exhumed and reinterred at the Rock Island National Cemetery in Illinois.

== Military awards ==
Pvt. Ignatowski is entitled to the following military awards:

- Purple Heart Medal with one 5/16" Gold Star
- Combat Action Ribbon*
- Navy Presidential Unit Citation
- American Campaign Medal
- Asiatic-Pacific Campaign Medal with one 3/16" bronze star
- World War II Victory Medal

== Legacy ==
- The AMVETS Ralph A. Ignatowski Memorial Post 60, Oak Creek, Wisconsin, was officially dedicated on June 3, 1956.
- Ralph Ignatowski, portrayed by English actor Jamie Bell, appears in the 2006 movie Flags of Our Fathers, directed and co-produced by Clint Eastwood. The movie, taken from the book of the same title, includes opening scenes of Ignatowski on the ship going to Iwo Jima, scenes on Iwo Jima, and scenes of "Doc" Bradley's (played by Ryan Phillippe) battlefield search for his Marine buddy "Iggy" (Ignatowski) who seems to have disappeared. In the movie, Pfc. Ignatowski's corpse is found, but its condition is only alluded to. The movie viewer never sees his body. Bradley constantly asks during the film, "Where is he?", as he flashbacks searching for "Iggy" on the battlefield.
- "Iggy" is also presumed to be seen in the film, Letters from Iwo Jima, given that in one scene, a captured marine is seen being beaten and bayoneted to death by Japanese soldiers. Furthermore, the said film is a companion piece to Flags of our Fathers, which were both filmed back to back.
