= Ignatowski =

Ignatowski is a surname of Slavic origin. The name may refer to:

- Jim Ignatowski, fictional character on the 1978–83 American TV series Taxi
- Ralph Ignatowski (1926–1945), U.S. Marine, killed in battle at Iwo Jima
- Vladimir Ignatowski (1875–1942), Russian physicist
