= Flags of Our Fathers (film) =

2006 film by Clint Eastwood

- Theatrical release poster
- Directed by: Clint Eastwood
- Screenplay by: William Broyles Jr.; Paul Haggis
- Based on: Flags of Our Fathers by James Bradley and Ron Powers
- Produced by: Clint Eastwood; Robert Lorenz; Steven Spielberg
- Starring: Ryan Phillippe; Jesse Bradford; Adam Beach
- Cinematography: Tom Stern
- Edited by: Joel Cox
- Music by: Clint Eastwood
- Production companies: DreamWorks Pictures; Malpaso Productions; Amblin Entertainment
- Distributed by: Paramount Pictures (United States and Bahamas); Warner Bros. Pictures (International)
- Release date: October 20, 2006
- Running time: 132 minutes
- Country: United States
- Language: English
- Budget: $90 million
- Box office: $65.9 million

Flags of Our Fathers is a 2006 American war drama film directed, co-produced, and scored by Clint Eastwood and written by William Broyles Jr. and Paul Haggis. It is based on the 2000 book of the same name written by James Bradley and Ron Powers about the 1945 Battle of Iwo Jima, the five Marines and one Navy corpsman who were involved in raising the flag on Iwo Jima, and the after effects of that event on their lives. Taken from the American viewpoint of the Battle of Iwo Jima, the film is a companion piece to Eastwood's Letters from Iwo Jima, which depicts the same battle from the Japanese viewpoint; the two films were shot back to back.

The film was released on October 20, 2006 by Paramount Pictures in the United States and the Bahamas and by Warner Bros. Pictures in international markets. Although it was a box office failure, only grossing $65.9 million against a $90 million budget, the film received favorable reviews from critics. The companion film Letters from Iwo Jima was released in Japan on December 9, 2006, and in the United States on December 20, 2006, grossing slightly more than Flags of Our Fathers and was deemed the superior film by critics.

== Plot ==
After training at Camp Tarawa in Hawaii, the 28th Marine Regiment 5th Marine Division sails to invade Iwo Jima. The Navy bombards suspected Japanese positions for three days. On February 19, 1945, the Marines' amphibious landings secure a beachhead on Iwo Jima.

During the advance on Mount Suribachi, Navy Pharmacist's Mate 2nd Class John "Doc" Bradley saves the lives of several Marines under fire. A platoon is ordered to the top to hoist a United States flag. Secretary of the Navy James Forrestal witnesses the flag raising, and orders the flag retrieved for himself. Thinking his battalion deserves the flag more, Colonel Chandler Johnson sends Private First Class Rene Gagnon up to replace the first flag. Sergeant Mike Strank, Doc, Marine Private First Class Ira Hayes, Rene, Corporal Harlon Block and Private First Class Franklin Sousley are photographed by Joe Rosenthal as they raise the second flag.

During the fighting that continues for weeks afterward Strank, Sergeant Hank Hansen and Harlon are killed in action. Japanese troops capture Private First Class Ralph "Iggy" Ignatowski. Doc finds his mutilated body days later in a cave. Franklin is killed by machine gun fire and Doc is wounded by artillery while trying to save a fellow corpsman.

Rosenthal's photograph is transmitted to press services in the United States and it becomes popular immediately and its value as a propaganda tool prompts an investigation. Rene is asked to name the six men in the photo; he identifies himself, Mike, Doc, and Franklin, but misidentifies Harlon as Hank. Rene eventually names a reluctant Ira as the sixth man.

Doc, Ira, and Rene are sent home as part of the seventh bond tour. When they arrive to a hero's welcome in Washington, DC, Doc notices Hank's mother is on the list of mothers of the dead flag raisers. Ira denounces the bond drive as a farce. Bud Gerber of the Treasury Department reprimands the men, telling them if the bond drive fails to raise money, the U.S. will abandon the Pacific and their sacrifices will be for nothing. The three agree not to admit Hank wasn't in the photograph.

As the drive continues, Ira grows increasingly guilt ridden, faces discrimination as a Native American, and descends into alcoholism. After throwing up one night in front of General Alexander Vandegrift, commandant of the Marine Corps, Ira is sent back to his unit and the bond drive continues without him.

After the war, the three survivors return home. Ira struggles with alcoholism and is never able to escape his unwanted fame. After finishing a prison sentence he hitchhikes over 1,300 miles to Texas to tell Harlon Block's family their son was indeed in the photograph. In 1954, the USMC War Memorial is dedicated and the three flag raisers see each other one last time. Ira is found dead a year later from exposure after a night of drinking. Doc visits Iggy's mother but lies about the nature of his death. Rene fails to capitalize on the job opportunities offered him during the bond drive and spends the rest of his life as a janitor. Doc finds success running his own funeral home. In 1994, on his deathbed, he tells his story to his son, James.

== Cast ==
- Ryan Phillippe as Pharmacist's Mate Second Class John Bradley, the only one of the six flag raisers who was not a Marine
  - George Grizzard as Elderly John Bradley
- Jesse Bradford as Private First Class Rene Gagnon
- Adam Beach as Private First Class Ira Hayes
- John Benjamin Hickey as Technical Sergeant Keyes Beech
- John Slattery as Bud Gerber
- Paul Walker as Sergeant Hank Hansen, who helped with the first flag raising and was misidentified as Harlon Block
- Jamie Bell as Private Ralph Ignatowski
- Barry Pepper as Sergeant Michael Strank
- Robert Patrick as Lieutenant Colonel Chandler Johnson
- Neal McDonough as Captain Dave Severance
  - Harve Presnell as Elderly Dave Severance
- Melanie Lynskey as Pauline Harnois Gagnon
- Tom McCarthy as James Bradley
- Chris Bauer as General Alexander Vandegrift, the Commandant of the Marine Corps
- Gordon Clapp as General Holland Smith, who led the invasion of Iwo Jima
- Ned Eisenberg as Joe Rosenthal, the journalist who took the famous photograph
- Kirk B. R. Woller as Bill Genaust, US Marine Corps war photographer who filmed the flag-raising
- Judith Ivey as Belle Block
- Ann Dowd as Mrs. Strank
- Myra Turley as Madeline Evelley
- Jason Gray-Stanford as Lieutenant Harold G. Schrier
- Joseph Michael Cross as Private First Class Franklin Sousley
- Benjamin Walker as Corporal Harlon Block, who was misidentified as Hank Hansen
- Alessandro Mastrobuono as Corporal Chuck Lindberg
- Scott Eastwood as Private Roberto Lundsford
- David Patrick Kelly as President Harry S. Truman
- Jeremiah Kirnberger as Gunners Mate 1st Class
- Stark Sands as Private Walter Gust
  - George Hearn as Elderly Walter Gust

== Production ==
The film rights to the book were purchased by DreamWorks Pictures in June 2000. Producer Steven Spielberg brought William Broyles to write the first drafts of the script, before director Clint Eastwood brought Paul Haggis to rewrite. In the process of reading about the Japanese perspective of the war, in particular General Tadamichi Kuribayashi, Eastwood decided to film a companion piece with Letters from Iwo Jima, which was shot entirely in Japanese. Clint's son Scott and Bradley Cooper auditioned for one of the leading roles. Flags of Our Fathers was shot in the course of 58 days. Jared Leto was originally cast as Rene Gagnon but had to back out due to a tour commitment with his band, Thirty Seconds to Mars.

Flags of Our Fathers cost $55 million, although it was originally budgeted at $80 million. Variety subsequently downgraded the price tag to $55 million. Although the film is taken from the American viewpoint of the battle, it was filmed almost entirely in Iceland and Southern California, with a few scenes shot in Chicago. Shooting ended early 2006, before production for Letters from Iwo Jima began in March 2006.

== Release ==
The film was released in theaters in the United States on October 20, 2006.

=== Home media ===
The DVD was released in the United States by DreamWorks Home Entertainment and internationally by Warner Home Video on February 6, 2007. It is devoid of any special features.

A two-disc Special Collector's Edition DVD (with special features) was released on May 22, 2007. It was also released on HD DVD and Blu-ray formats.

The Two-Disc Special Collector's Edition DVD is also available in a five-disc commemorative set that also includes the two-disc Special Collector's Edition of Letters from Iwo Jima and a bonus fifth disc containing History Channel's Heroes of Iwo Jima documentary and To the Shores of Iwo Jima, a documentary produced by the United States Navy and the United States Marine Corps, released by Warner Home Video.

== Reception ==
=== Box office ===
Despite critical acclaim, the film under-performed at the box office, earning just $65,900,249 worldwide against an estimated $90 million production budget. Its companion film Letters From Iwo Jima was more profitable with a box office run of $71 million on a budget of $19 million.

=== Critical reception ===
On review aggregator Rotten Tomatoes, Flags of Our Fathers has an approval rating of 76% based on 239 reviews with a mean of 7.4 of a possible 10. The site's consensus states: "Flags of Our Fathers is both a fascinating look at heroism, both earned and manufactured, and a well-filmed salute to the men who fought at the battle of Iwo Jima." On Metacritic, the film scored a 79 out of 100 based on 39 reviews, indicating "generally favorable" reviews. Audiences polled by CinemaScore gave the film an average grade of "A-" on an A+ to F scale.

Roger Ebert gave the film four stars out of four praising the film for its depiction of war.

The film made the top-10 list of the National Board of Review. Eastwood also earned a Golden Globe nomination for directing. The film was nominated for two Academy Awards — for Best Sound Mixing (John T. Reitz, David E. Campbell, Gregg Rudloff, and Walt Martin) and Sound Editing. Film critic Richard Roeper said, "Clint Eastwood's Flags of Our Fathers stands with the Oscar-winning Unforgiven and Million Dollar Baby as an American masterpiece. It is a searing and powerful work from a 76-year-old artist who remains at the top of his game... [and] Flags of Our Fathers is a patriotic film in that it honors those who fought in the Pacific, but it is also patriotic because it questions the official version of the truth, and reminds us that superheroes exist only in comic books and cartoon movies."

=== Top ten lists ===
Flags of Our Fathers was listed on numerous critics' top ten lists for 2006.

- 1st – Kenneth Turan, Los Angeles Times (tied with Letters from Iwo Jima)
- 1st – Michael Wilmington, Chicago Tribune
- 1st – Kirk Honeycutt, The Hollywood Reporter
- 1st – Stephen Hunter, The Washington Post
- 2nd – Scott Foundas, L.A. Weekly (tied with Letters from Iwo Jima)
- 3rd – Peter Travers, Rolling Stone (tied with Letters from Iwo Jima)
- 3rd – Shawn Levy, Portland Oregonian (tied with Letters from Iwo Jima)
- 3rd – Jack Matthews, New York Daily News (tied with Letters from Iwo Jima)
- 3rd – Richard Roeper, At the Movies (tied with Letters from Iwo Jima)
- 3rd – Claudia Puig, USA Today
- 4th – William Arnold, Seattle Post-Intelligencer
- 5th – Ray Bennett, The Hollywood Reporter
- 5th – Richard Schickel, Time
- 5th – David Edelstein, Fresh Air (tied with Letters from Iwo Jima)
- 7th – Roger Ebert, Chicago Sun-Times (tied with Letters from Iwo Jima)
- Best of 2006 (listed alphabetically, not ranked) – David Denby, The New Yorker

=== Spike Lee controversy ===
At the 2008 Cannes Film Festival, director Spike Lee, who was making Miracle at St. Anna, about an all-Black U.S. division fighting in Italy during World War II, criticized director Clint Eastwood for not depicting Black Marines in Flags of Our Fathers. Citing historical accuracy, Eastwood responded that his film was specifically about the Marines who raised the flag on Mount Suribachi at Iwo Jima, pointing out that while Black Marines did fight at Iwo Jima, the U.S. military was segregated during World War II, and none of the men who raised the flag were Black. Eastwood believed Lee was using the comments to promote Miracle at St. Anna and angrily said that Lee should "shut his face". Lee responded that Eastwood was acting like an "angry old man", and argued that despite making two Iwo Jima films back to back, Letters from Iwo Jima and Flags of Our Fathers, "there was not one Black Marine in both of those films".

Contrary to Lee's claims, however, Black Marines (including an all-Black unit) are seen in several scenes during which the mission is outlined, as well as during the initial landings, when a wounded Black Marine is carried away. During the end credits, historical photographs taken during the Battle of Iwo Jima show Black Marines. Although Black Marines fought in the battle, they were restricted to auxiliary roles, such as ammunition supply, and were not involved in the battle's major assaults; they did, however, take part in defensive actions. According to Alexander M. Bielakowski and Raffaele Ruggeri, "Half a million African Americans served overseas during World War II, almost all in segregated second-line units." The number of African Americans killed in action during WWII was 708.

Spielberg later intervened between the two directors, after which Lee sent a copy of a film on which he was working to Eastwood for a private screening as a seeming token of apology.

=== Later corrections on the identity of the flag-raisers ===
The United States Marine Corps have conducted multiple investigations of the identities of the flag-raisers at Iwo-Jima, revealing that two of them were mistakenly portrayed in the film and other media. Until June 23, 2016, author James Bradley's father John Bradley, Navy corpsman, was misidentified as being one of the figures who raised the second flag, and incorrectly depicted on the bronze statue memorial, as one of the five flag-raisers. Similarly, until October 16, 2019, Rene Gagnon was also misidentified. In reality, marines Harold Keller and Harold Schultz were in their places respectively, and the two were not depicted in the film.

== See also ==
- C. C. Beall

== Bibliography ==
- Eliot, Marc (2009). American Rebel: The Life of Clint Eastwood. Harmony Books. ISBN 978-0-307-33688-0.
