= John Bradley (United States Navy) =

United States Navy corpsman (1923-1994)

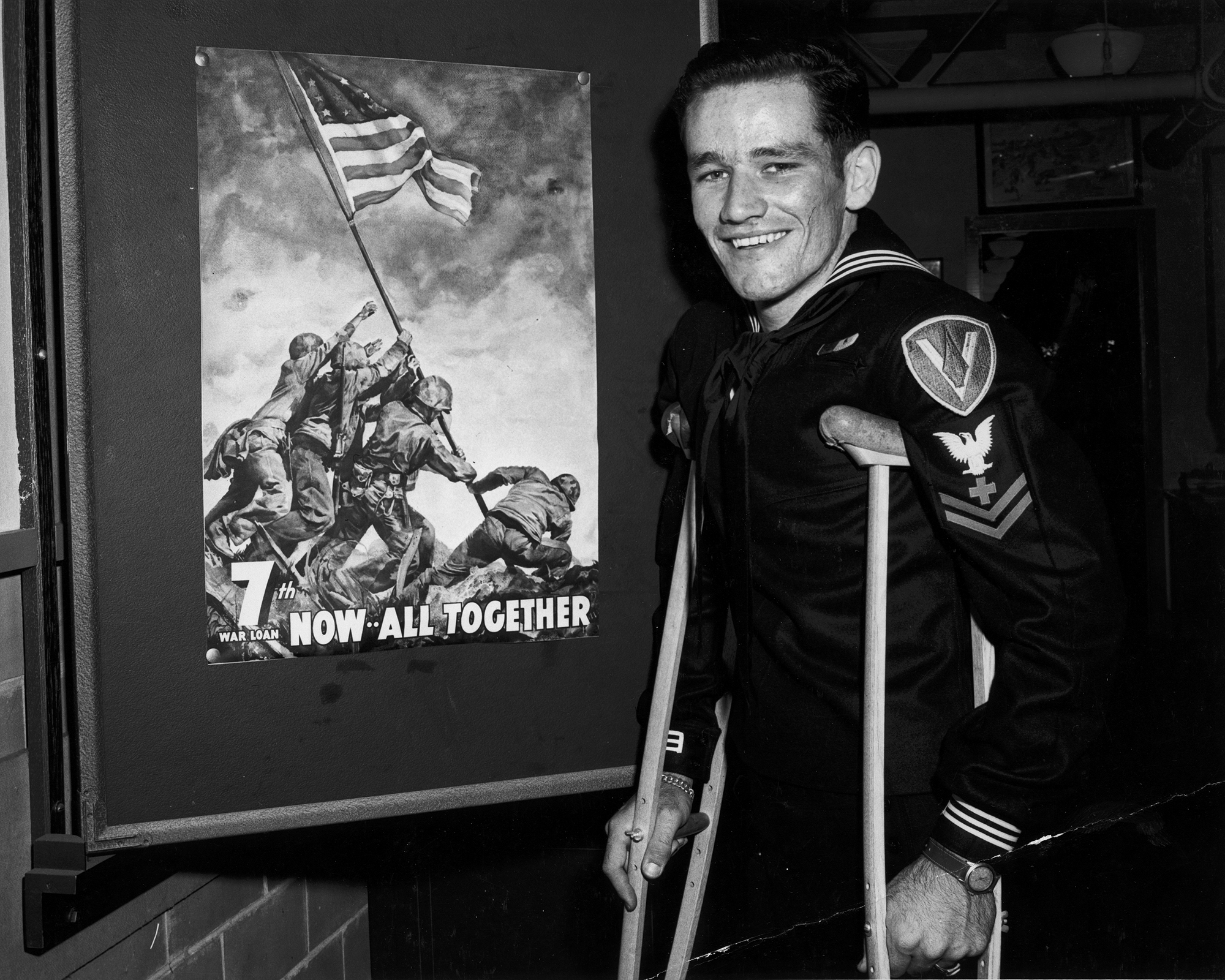
- Bradley in the White House, April 1945
- Born: John Henry Bradley; July 10, 1923; Antigo, Wisconsin, U.S.
- Died: January 11, 1994 (aged 70); Antigo, Wisconsin, U.S.
- Burial place: Queen of Peace Catholic Cemetery, Antigo, Wisconsin
- Military career
- Allegiance: United States of America
- Branch: United States Navy
- Service years: 1942–1945
- Rank: Pharmacist's Mate Second Class
- Nickname: "Jack" or "Doc"
- Units: 2nd Battalion, 28th Marines, 5th Marine Division
- Conflicts: World War II: Battle of Iwo Jima
- Awards: Navy Cross; Purple Heart Medal; Combat Action Ribbon

John Henry "Jack" "Doc" Bradley (July 10, 1923 – January 11, 1994) was a United States Navy Hospital corpsman who was awarded the Navy Cross for extraordinary heroism while serving with the Marines during the Battle of Iwo Jima in World War II. During the battle, he was a member of the patrol that captured the top of Mount Suribachi and raised the first U.S. flag on Iwo Jima on February 23, 1945.

Bradley was generally known as being one of the men who raised the second U.S. flag on Mount Suribachi on February 23, 1945, as depicted in the iconic photograph Raising the Flag on Iwo Jima by photographer Joe Rosenthal. On June 23, 2016, the Marine Corps announced publicly (after an investigation) that Bradley was not in the photograph. The man long thought to have been Bradley was identified as Private First Class Franklin Sousley, who had previously been thought to be in another position in the photograph, and the man who had been originally identified as Sousley was identified as Private First Class Harold Schultz. Bradley is one of three men who were originally identified incorrectly as flag-raisers in the photograph (the others being Hank Hansen and Rene Gagnon).

The first flag raised over Mount Suribachi at the south end of Iwo Jima was deemed too small. Although there were photographs taken of the first flag flying on Mount Suribachi after it was raised that include Bradley holding the flagstaff, there is no photograph of the first flag-raising. The second flag-raising photograph became famous and was widely reproduced. Bradley also was photographed near the second flag. After the battle, Bradley and two Marines were identified as surviving second flag-raisers and were reassigned to help raise funds for the Seventh War Loan drive.

The Marine Corps War Memorial in Arlington, Virginia, is modeled after Rosenthal's photograph of six Marines raising the second flag on Iwo Jima.

== Early years ==
John Bradley was born in Antigo, Wisconsin, to Irish Catholics James ("Cabbage") (1894–1953) and Kathryn Bradley (1895–1961). He was the second eldest of five children. He grew up in Appleton, Wisconsin, graduating from Appleton Senior High School in 1941. His younger sister Mary Ellen died of pneumonia at a young age. He had an interest in entering the funeral business from an early age, because he felt those were the men everyone looked up to, and later got a job at his local funeral home. He then completed an 18-month apprenticeship course with a local funeral director before he entered the U.S. Navy during World War II.

== U.S. Navy ==
Bradley enlisted the U.S. Navy on January 13, 1943, when his father suggested it as a way to avoid ground combat. In March 1943, following his completion of Navy recruit training at the Farragut Naval Training Station at Bayview, Idaho, he was assigned to the Hospital Corps School at Farragut, Idaho. After completing the Hospital corpsman course, he was assigned to Naval Hospital Oakland in Oakland, California. In January 1944, he was assigned to the Fleet Marine Force and sent to one of the "field medical service schools" (FMSS) at a Marine Corps base for combat medical training in order to serve with a Marine Corps unit. After completing the course, he was assigned to the 5th Marine Division on April 15, a newly activated infantry division which was then being formed at Camp Pendleton, California. He was reassigned there to Easy Company, 2nd Battalion, 28th Marine Regiment of the division.

=== Battle of Iwo Jima ===
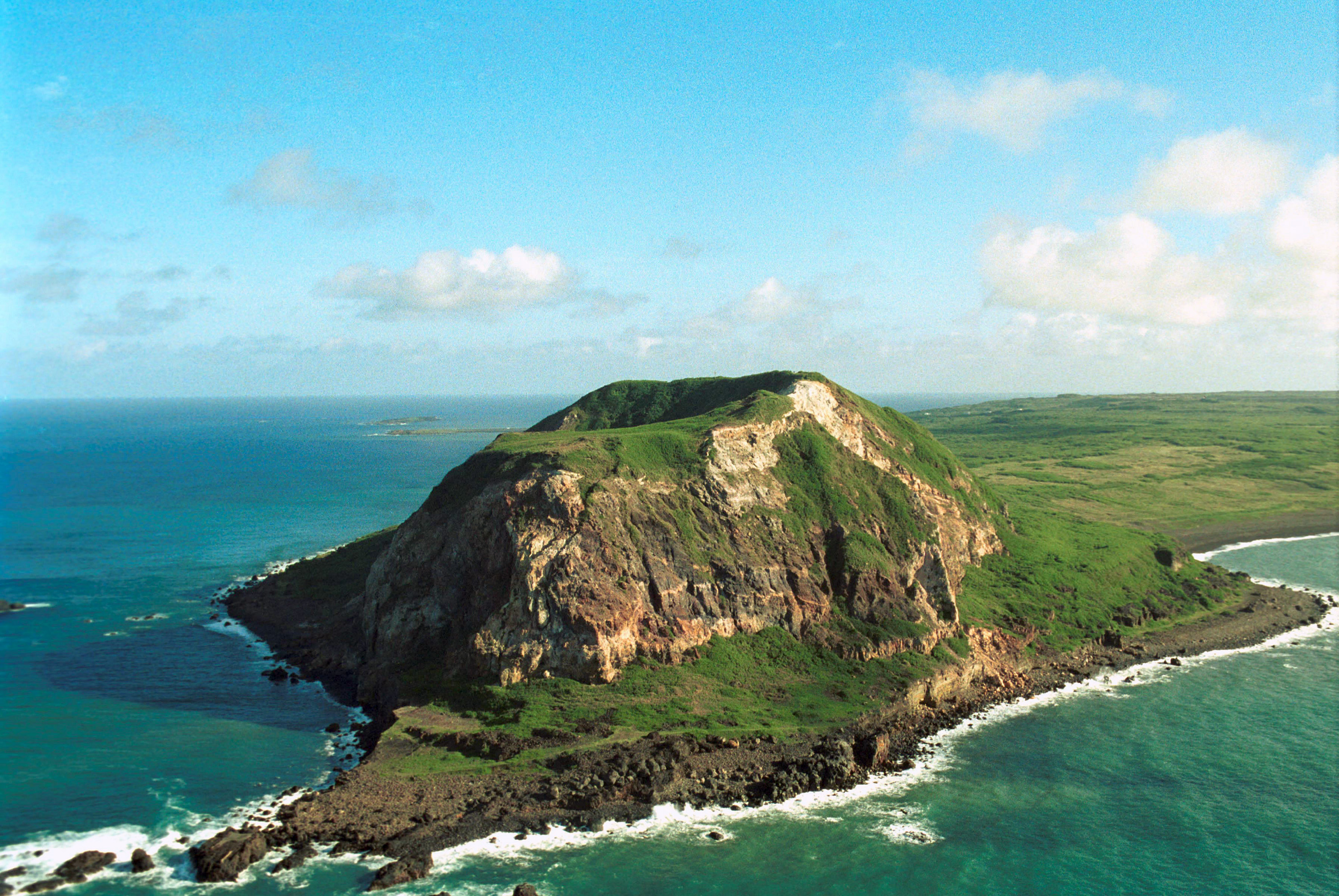
Mount Suribachi on Iwo Jima

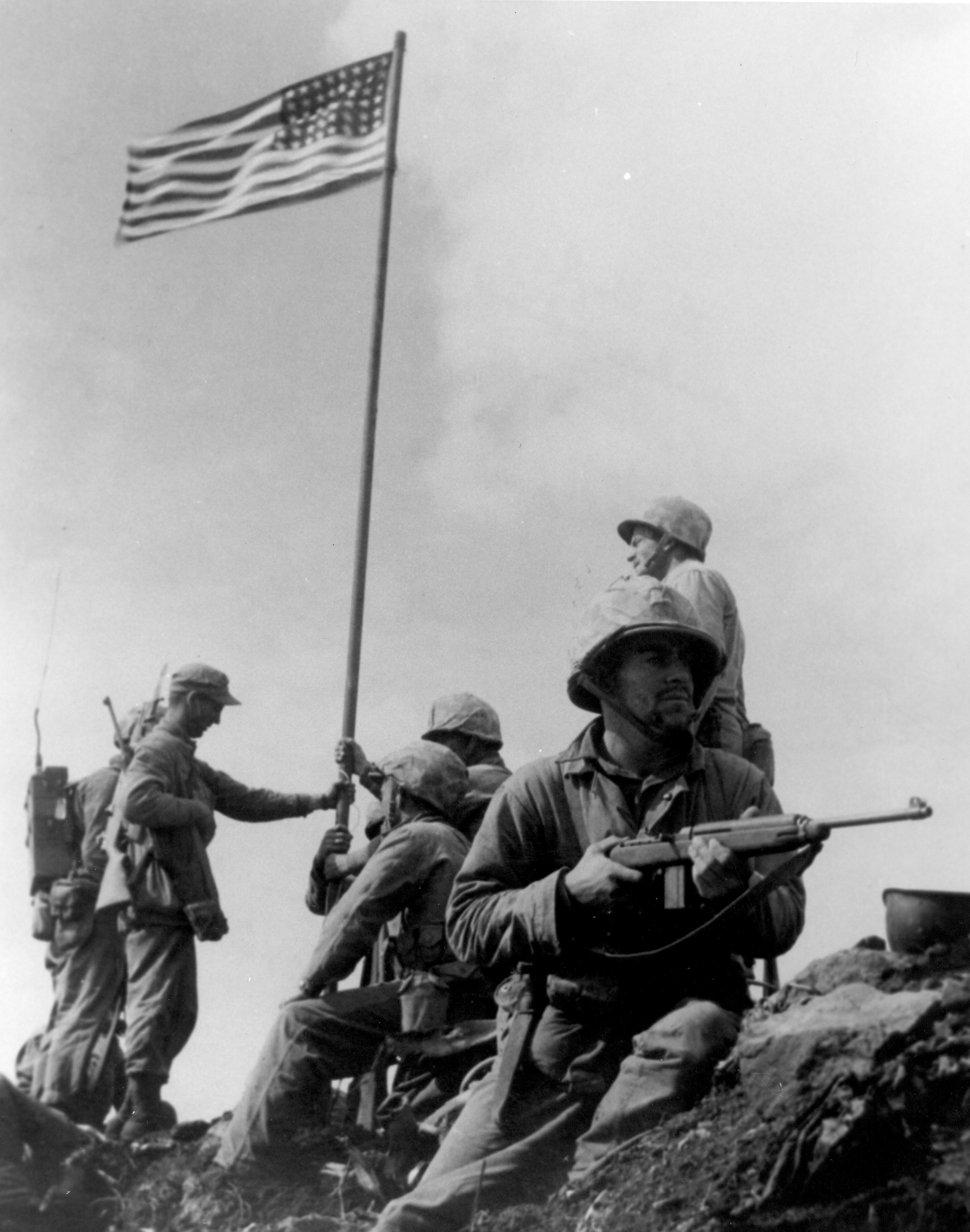
Marine Staff Sergeant Lou Lowery's photograph of the first U.S. flag on Mount Suribachi. Left to right: 1st lieutenant Harold Schrier (left side of radioman), private first class Raymond Jacobs (radioman), Sergeant Henry Hansen (soft cap, holding flagstaff), private Phil Ward (holding lower flagstaff), Platoon Sgt. Ernest Thomas (seated), PhM2c. Bradley, USN (holding flagstaff above Ward), Private First Class James Michels (holding M1 carbine), and Corporal Charles W. Lindberg (standing above Michels).

On February 19, 1945, the 5th Marine Division which included Bradley took part in the assault on Iwo Jima which was one of the most bitterly fought battles of the Pacific War's island-hopping campaign.

Bradley was assigned to Third Platoon, E Company, 2nd Battalion, 28th Marines before and when they landed on the beach with the ninth wave of assault Marines at the south end of Iwo Jima near Mount Suribachi. After Bradley and PhM3c. Clifford Langley, the other E Company corpsman assigned to Third Platoon, aided American casualties on the beach, they continued on with E Company as the 2nd Battalion, 28th Marines advanced towards Mount Suribachi, which was their objective on the southwest end of the island. On February 21, Bradley risked his life under fire to save the life of a Marine at the base of the mountain who was caught in the open under heavy Japanese fire. While still under and exposed to enemy fire, and in order to save the lives of other Marines who were willing to expose themselves under fire to bring back the wounded Marine, Bradley brought the wounded Marine to safety himself. He was awarded the Navy Cross for his actions.

==== First flag-raising ====
On February 23, Lieutenant Colonel Chandler W. Johnson, the Second Battalion commander, ordered a combat patrol to climb, seize, and occupy the top of Mount Suribachi and raise the battalion's flag if possible to signal it was secure. Captain Dave Severance, commander of E Company, organized a 40-man patrol taken from his Third Platoon and the battalion. First Lieutenant Harold Schrier, his executive officer and former Marine Raider, was chosen by Lt. Col. Johnson to be in command of the patrol to take the men up Mount Suribachi. At 8:30 a.m., the patrol started to climb the east slope of Suribachi. The patrol included Bradley from Third Platoon and Navy corpsman Gerald Ziehme (he replaced PhM2c. Clifford Langley, who was wounded on February 21). Less than an hour later, after receiving occasional Japanese sniper fire, the patrol reached the rim of the volcano. After a brief firefight there, Lieutenant Schrier and his men captured the summit. After finding a Japanese steel pipe and attaching the flag to it, the flagstaff was taken to the highest place on the crater. At about 10:30 a.m., Schrier, Platoon Sergeant Ernest Thomas, Sergeant Henry Hansen, and Corporal Charles Lindberg raised the flag. Seeing the raising of the national colors immediately caused loud cheering from the marines, sailors, and Coast Guardsmen on the beach below and from the men on the ships docked at the beach. A short time later, as the high winds on top caused the flagstaff to move sideways, Bradley helped make the flagstaff stay in a vertical position. The men at and around the flagstaff were photographed several times by Staff Sgt. Louis R. Lowery, a photographer with Leatherneck magazine who accompanied the patrol up the mountain. Platoon Sergeant Thomas was killed on Iwo Jima on March 3 and Sgt. Hansen was killed on March 1.

==== Second flag-raising ====
Marine Sergeant Bill Genaust's color film of the second flag raising.

Since the first flag flown over Mount Suribachi was regarded as too small to be seen by the thousands of Marines fighting on the other side of Iwo Jima, it was decided that a larger flag should be flown on the mountain. Marine Sergeant Michael Strank a rifle squad leader from Second Platoon, E Company, was ordered by Captain Severance to ascend Mount Suribachi with three Marines from his squad and raise the replacement flag. Sgt. Strank ordered Corporal Harlon Block, Private First Class Ira Hayes, and Private First Class Franklin Sousley to go with him up Suribachi. Private First Class Rene Gagnon, the company's runner (messenger), was ordered to take the replacement flag up the mountain and return the first flag back down the mountain to the battalion adjutant.

Once all five Marines were on top, a Japanese steel pipe was found by Hayes and Sousley who carried the pipe to Strank and Block near the first flag. The second flag was attached to the pipe and, as Strank and his three Marines were about to raise the flagstaff, he yelled out to two nearby Marines from Lieutenant Schrier's patrol to help them raise it. At approximately 1 p.m., Schrier ordered the raising of the second flag and the lowering of the original flag. The second flag was raised by Strank, Block, Hayes, Sousley, Private First Class Harold Schultz, and Private First Class Harold Keller. Afterwards, rocks were added at the bottom of the flagstaff which was then stabilized by three guy-ropes. Joe Rosenthal's (Associated Press) historical black and white photograph of the second flag-raising on February 23, 1945, appeared in Sunday newspapers on February 25. This flag raising was also filmed in color by Marine sergeant Bill Genaust (killed in action in March) and was used in newsreels. Other combat photographers besides Rosenthal ascended the mountain after the first flag was raised and the mountaintop secured. These photographers, including private first class George Burns, an army photographer who was assigned to cover Marine amphibious landings for Yank Magazine, took photos of Marines, corpsmen, and themselves, around both of the flags.

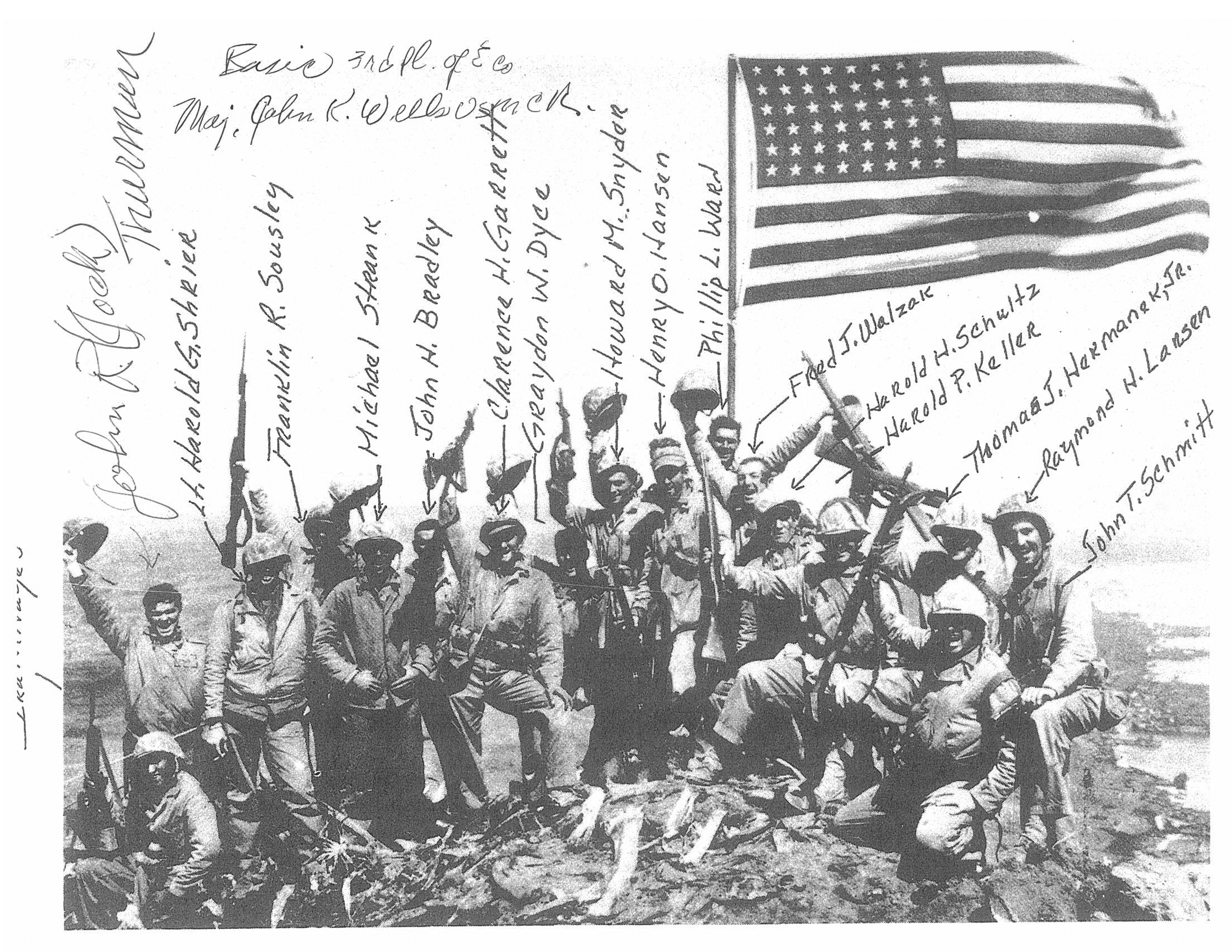
PhM2c Bradley, USN and PhM2c Ziehme, USN, are sixth and eighth from left, in Joe Rosenthal's "Gung Ho" photo

==== Subsequent events ====
- March 1, Sergeant Strank and Corporal Block were killed.
- March 2, Lieutenant Colonel Johnson was killed.
- March 4, Sergeant Genaust was killed.
- March 4, Bradley shot a Japanese soldier who was charging him with a bayonet as he was attending to a wounded Marine in a shell hole.
- March 12, Bradley and three Marines received shrapnel wounds from an enemy mortar round explosion. Bradley was wounded in the legs and feet and was evacuated from the combat zone to the battalion aid station. After being transferred to a field hospital, he was flown to Guam, Hawaii, and Oakland Naval Hospital.
- March 14, General Holland Smith ordered a U.S. flag officially raised with a ceremony at V Amphibious Corps headquarters located near Mount Suribachi, and the U.S. flag flying on the summit of Mount Suribachi be taken down.
- March 21, Private First Class Sousley was killed.
- March 26, the battle of Iwo Jima was officially over.

=== Bond-selling tour ===
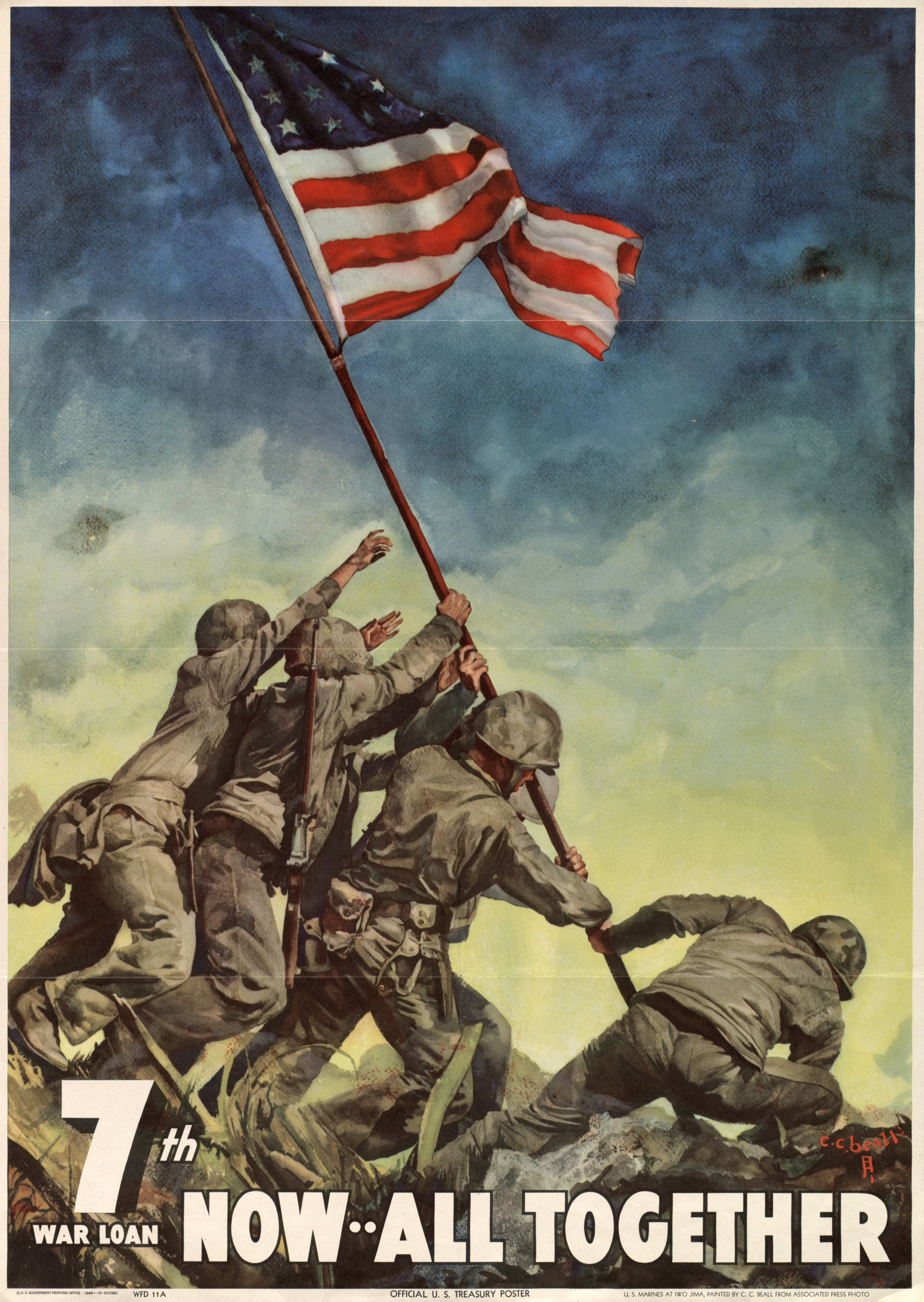
Seventh War Loan Drive Poster (May 11–July 4, 1945)

In March 1945, President Franklin D. Roosevelt ordered that the flag raisers in Joe Rosenthal's photograph be sent immediately after the battle to Washington, D.C., to appear as a public morale factor. Private first class Gagnon had returned with his unit to Camp Tarawa in Hawaii when he was ordered on April 3 to report to Marine Corps headquarters at Washington, D.C. He arrived on April 7, and was questioned by a lieutenant colonel at the Marine Corps public information office concerning the identities of those in the photo. On April 8, the Marine Corps gave a press release of the names of the six flag raisers in the Rosenthal photograph given by Gagnon: Marines Michael Strank (KIA), Henry Hansen (KIA), Franklin Sousley (KIA), Ira Hayes, Navy corpsman John Bradley, and himself. After Gagnon gave the names of the flag raisers, Bradley and Hayes were ordered to report to Marine Corps headquarters.

President Roosevelt died on April 12, and Vice President Harry S. Truman was sworn in as president the same day. Bradley was recovering from his wounds at Oakland Naval Hospital in Oakland, California and was transferred to Bethesda Naval Hospital in Bethesda, Maryland, where he was shown Rosenthal's flag-raising photograph and was told he was in it. He arrived in Washington, D.C., on crutches on or about April 19. Hayes also arrived from Hawaii and San Francisco on April 19. Both men were questioned separately by the same Marine officer that Gagnon met with concerning the identities of the six flag-raisers in the Rosenthal photograph. Bradley agreed with all six names of the flag raisers in the photo given by Gagnon including his own. Hayes agreed with all the names too including his own except he said the man identified as Sergeant Hansen at the base of the flagstaff in the photo was really Corporal Harlon Block. The Marine interviewer then told Hayes that a list of the names of the six flag-raisers in the photo were already released publicly and besides Block and Hansen were both killed in action (during the Marine Corps investigation in 1946, the lieutenant colonel denied Hayes ever mentioned Block's name to him). After the interview, it was requested that Private First Class Gagnon, Private First Class Hayes, and Bradley participate in the Seventh War Loan drive. On April 20, Gagnon, Hayes, and Bradley met President Truman at the White House and each showed him their positions in the flag-raising poster that was on display there for the coming bond tour that they would participate in. A press conference was also held that day and Gagnon, Hayes, and Bradley were questioned about the flag-raising.

On May 9, the bond tour started with a flag-raising ceremony at the nation's capitol by Gagnon, Hayes, and PhM2c. Bradley, using the same flag that had been raised on Mount Suribachi. The tour began on May 11 in New York City and ended on July 4 with Gagnon and Bradley's return to Washington, D.C. (Hayes left the bond tour on May 25 after he was ordered back to E Company in Hawaii). The bond tour was held in 33 American cities that raised over $26 billion to help pay for and win the war.

=== Discharge ===
Bradley was medically discharged from the Navy in November 1945.

== Marriage and family life ==
Bradley married Betty Van Gorp (1924–2013), settled in Antigo, had eight children, and was active in numerous civic clubs, rarely taking part in ceremonies celebrating the flag-raising—and by the 1960s avoiding them altogether. He subsequently purchased and managed a funeral parlor. Bradley's wife later said he was tormented by memories of the war, wept in his sleep for the first four years of their marriage and kept a large knife in a dresser drawer for "protection". He also had flashbacks of his best friend Iggy, Ralph Ignatowski, who was captured and tortured by Japanese soldiers. Bradley could not forgive himself for not being there to try and save his friend's life.

== Marine Corps War Memorial ==
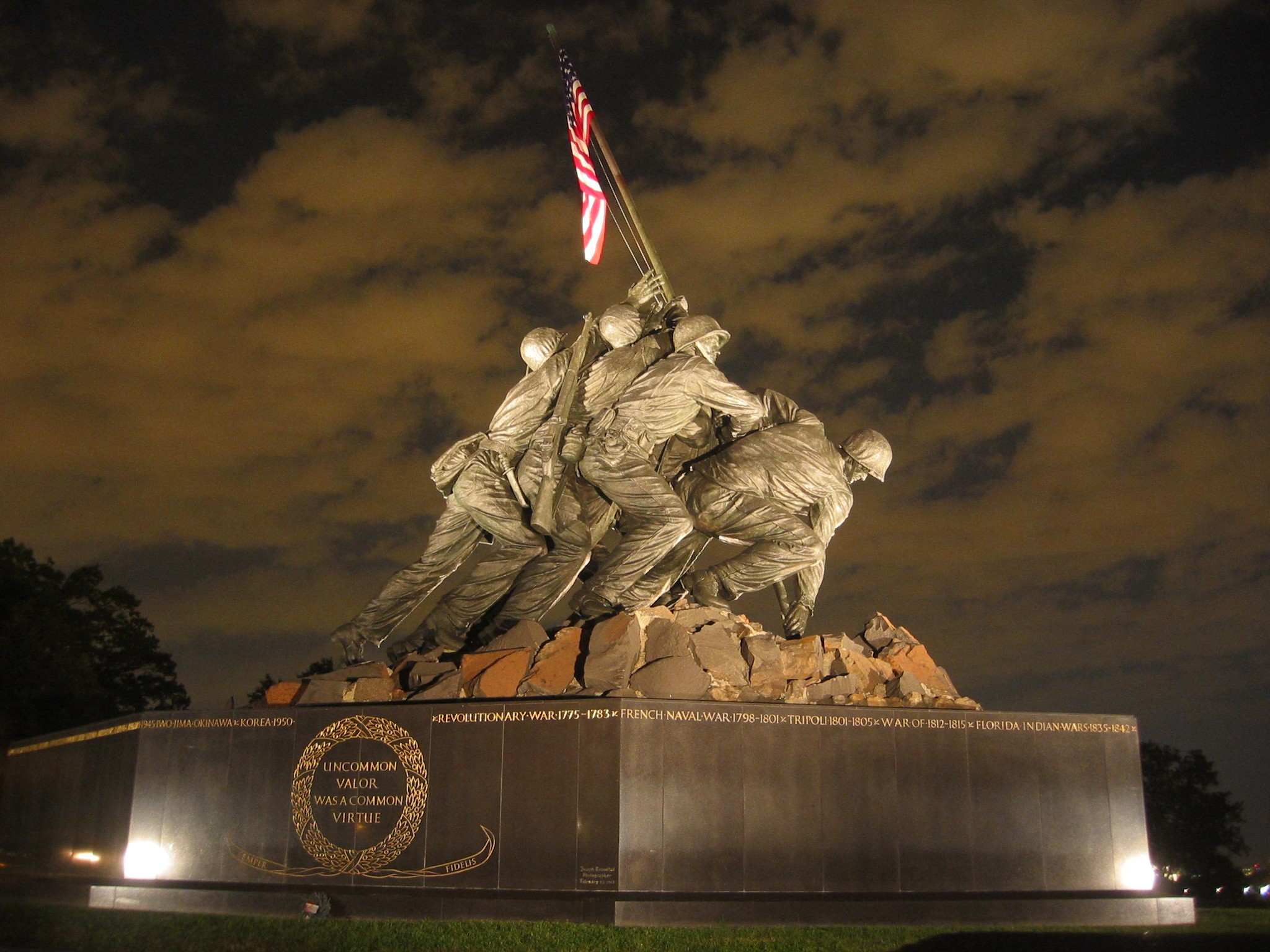
The U.S. Marine Corps War Memorial in Arlington, Virginia

The Marine Corps War Memorial (Iwo Jima Memorial) in Arlington, Virginia, was dedicated on November 10, 1954. The monument was sculptured by Felix de Weldon from the image of the second flag raising on Mount Suribachi. Until June 23, 2016, John Bradley was incorrectly depicted on the memorial as the third bronze figure from the base of the flagstaff with the 32-foot (9.8 M) bronze figures of the other five flag-raisers depicted on the monument; Franklin Sousley is now depicted instead of Bradley as the third bronze figure from the base of the flagstaff, and Harold Schultz in place of Sousley is now depicted as the fifth figure.

President Dwight D. Eisenhower sat upfront during the dedication ceremony with Vice President Richard Nixon, Secretary of Defense Charles E. Wilson, Deputy Secretary of Defense Robert Anderson, and General Lemuel C. Shepherd, the 20th Commandant of the Marine Corps. Hayes, one of the three surviving flag raisers depicted on the monument, was also seated upfront with John Bradley, Rene Gagnon (incorrectly identified as a flag raiser until October 16, 2019), Mrs Martha Strank, Mrs. Ada Belle Block, and Mrs. Goldie Price (mother of Franklin Sousley). Those giving remarks at the dedication included Robert Anderson, Chairman of Day, Colonel J.W. Moreau, U.S. Marine Corps (Retired), President, Marine Corps War Memorial Foundation, General Shepherd who presented the memorial to the American people, Felix de Weldon, and Richard Nixon who gave the dedication address. Inscribed on the memorial are the following words:

In Honor And Memory Of The Men of The United States Marine Corps Who Have Given Their Lives To Their Country Since 10 November 1775

== Death ==
On January 11, 1994, Bradley died at the age of 70 at a hospital in Antigo, Wisconsin, having suffered a heart attack and subsequently a stroke. He is buried at Queen of Peace Catholic Cemetery in Antigo.

== Flag raising views ==
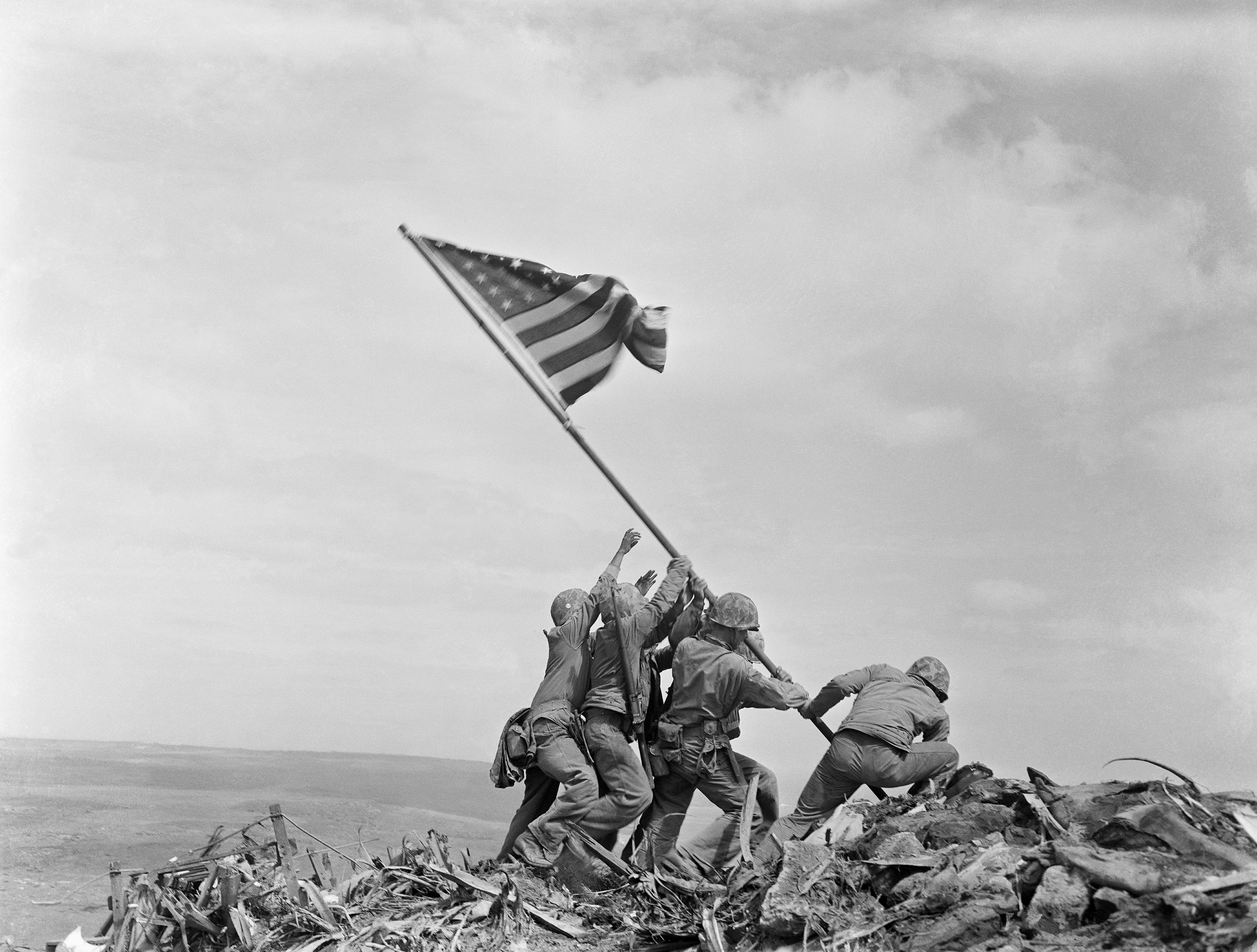
Joe Rosenthal's flag-raising photograph

Bradley wrote his parents a letter three days after the flag raising(s) that said he had a little to do with raising the American flag and it was the "happiest moment of my life";. Sergeant Henry Hansen, Private Phil Ward, and he had worked on making the first flagstaff stay vertical in the ground.

On May 9, 1945, Bradley did an oral interview by a Navy captain about the famous second flag-raising on Mount Suribachi, and said he was in the second flag-raising picture, and when questioned about the first flag-raising, he said Platoon Sgt. Ernest Thomas raised that flag.

Bradley was reluctant to talk to the media, family, and friends about the flag raising. He rarely did an interview about the flag raising for the newspapers, and he avoided reporters as much as possible. On February 23 each year, the press would contact his home to ask for interviews. He had his wife and children giving excuses such as he "was on a fishing trip in Canada." In 1949, during the filming of the movie Sands of Iwo Jima, Bradley told his wife to tell the townspeople that he was on a business trip in order to avoid attention that would be drawn to him.

In 1985, he did another interview about the flag raising at the urging of his wife, who had told him to do it for the sake of their grandchildren. During that interview, Bradley said that he would not have raised the flag if he had known how famous the photo (Rosenthal photograph) would become. He stated that he did not want to live with the pressures of the media and desired to live a normal life. He also stated during the interview, that anyone on the island could have raised the flag and that he was just there at the right time.

Bradley saw the flag raising as an insignificant event in a devastating battle. He rarely talked to people about it and spent most of his life trying to escape the attention he drew from allegedly raising it. He stated once that he "just happened to be there". He spoke to his wife only once about the flag raising during their 47-year marriage. That was on their first date, and he seemed very uninterested with it during the conversation. His daughter Barbara said, that "Reading a book on Iwo Jima at home would have been like reading a playgirl magazine ... it would have been something I had to hide." He told his children more than once that the only real heroes on Iwo Jima were those who did not survive.

His son James Bradley speculated that his father's determined silence and discomfort on the subject of his role in the Battle of Iwo Jima was largely due to his sad memories of his close friend on Iwo Jima who was killed by the Japanese, Marine Ralph "Iggy" Ignatowski. In his own words, and only once, he briefly told his son what happened with "Iggy":

I have tried so hard to block this out. To forget it. We could choose a buddy to go in with. My buddy was a guy from Milwaukee. We were pinned down in one area. Someone elsewhere fell injured and I ran to help out, and when I came back my buddy was gone. I couldn't figure out where he was. I could see all around, but he wasn't there. And nobody knew where he was. A few days later someone yelled that they'd found his body. They called me over because I was a corpsman. The Japanese had pulled him underground and tortured him. His fingernails ... his tongue ... it was absolutely terrible. I've tried hard to forget all this.

— John Bradley

Official reports revealed Ignatowski was captured, dragged into a tunnel by Japanese soldiers during the battle, and later found with his eyes, ears, fingernails, and tongue removed, his teeth smashed, the back of his head caved in, multiple bayonet wounds to the abdomen, and his arms broken. Bradley's recollections of discovering and taking care of Ignatowski's remains haunted him until his death, and he suffered for many years from post-traumatic stress disorder.

== Second flag-raiser corrections ==
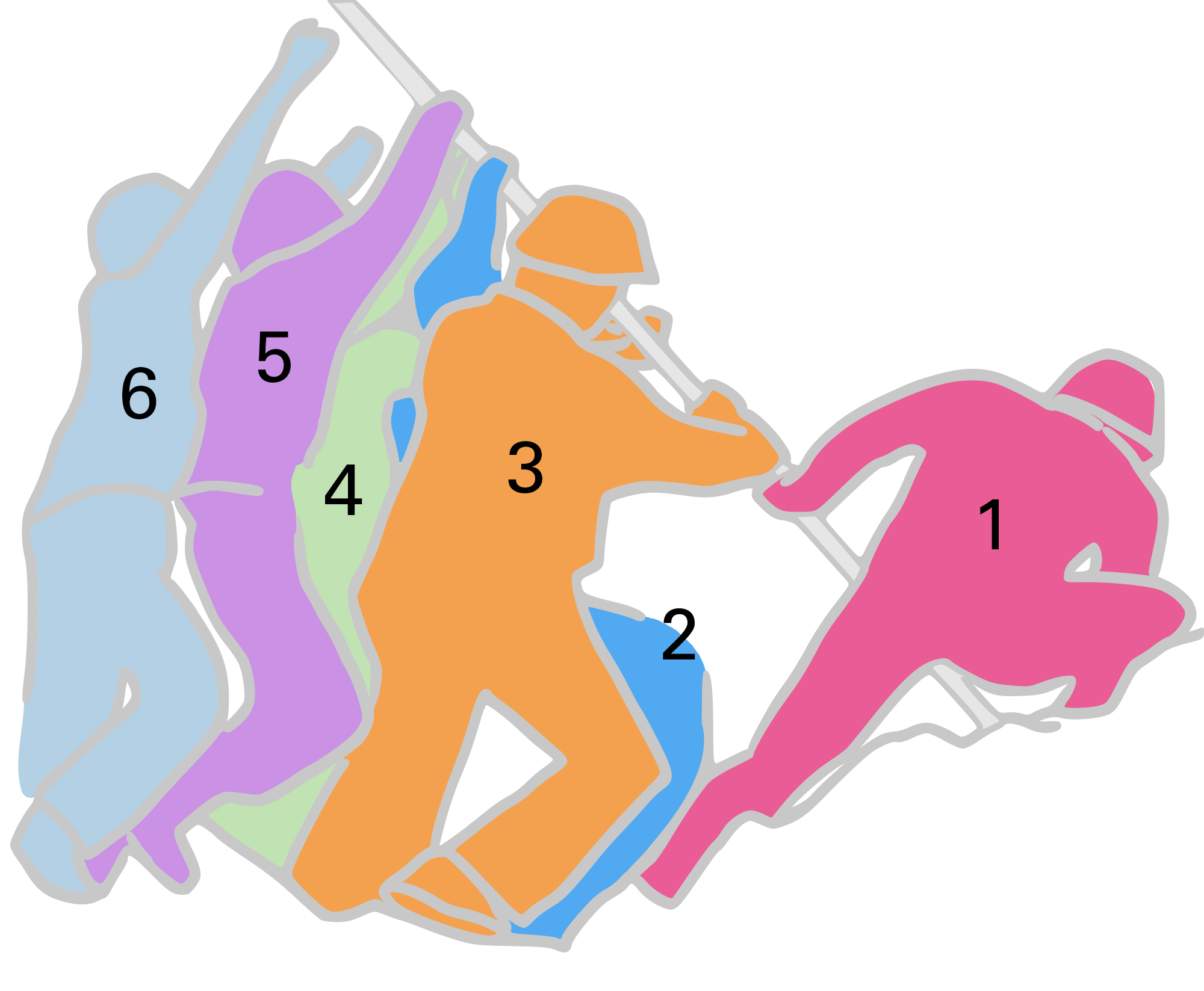
The six second flag-raisers: #1, Corporal Harlon Block (KIA) #2, Private First Class Harold Keller #3, Private First Class Franklin Sousley (KIA) #4, Sergeant Michael Strank (KIA) #5, Private First Class Harold Schultz #6, Private First Class Ira Hayes

Three Marine Corps investigations were held after World War II into the identities of the second flag-raisers who were made famous by the Joe Rosenthal photograph. None of the investigations were initiated by the Marine Corps.

A Marine Corps investigation of the identities of the six second flag-raisers began in December 1946 and concluded in January 1947 that it was corporal Harlon Block and not sergeant Henry Hansen at the base of the flagstaff in the Rosenthal photograph, and that no blame was to be placed on anyone in this matter. The identities of the other five second flag-raisers were confirmed. The investigation which centered basically on Block and Hansen was initiated by Ira Hayes in 1946.

The Marine Corps review board looked once more into the identities of the six second flag-raisers in Rosenthal's photograph, this time concluding in June 2016 that Harold Schultz was in the photograph and Navy corpsman John Bradley was not. Franklin Sousley, not Schultz, is now in the position initially ascribed to Bradley (fourth from left) in the photograph and Schultz is now in Sousley's former position (second from left) in the photograph. The identities of the other five flag-raisers were confirmed. The changes were the result of focusing on Schultz, PhM2c. Bradley, the Sergeant Genaust film, and comparison of many photographs (Bradley carried two medical bags and Schultz had a noticeable broken helmet strap) taken on Mount Suribachi. Schultz did not ever say publicly that he was a flag-raiser or in the photograph. A third Marine Corps investigation into the identities of the six second flag-raisers concluded in October 2019, that Keller was in Rosenthal's photograph in place of Private First Class Rene Gagnon (fifth from left). Gagnon, who carried the larger second flag up Mount Suribachi, helped lower the first flagstaff and removed the first flag to take down to the Second Battalion command post. The identities of the other five flag-raisers were confirmed. The changes were mainly the result of focusing on Keller and Gagnon and comparison of even more photographs than the previous investigation. Like Schultz, Keller did not ever say publicly he was a flag-raiser or that he was in the photograph.

== Military awards ==
Bradley's military decorations and awards include:

Navy Cross		Purple Heart Medal
Combat Action Ribbon	Navy Presidential Unit Citation	Navy Good Conduct Medal
American Campaign Medal	Asiatic-Pacific Campaign Medal w/ FMF Combat Operations Insignia and 3/16" bronze star	World War II Victory Medal

== Navy Cross citation ==
Bradley's Navy Cross citation reads:

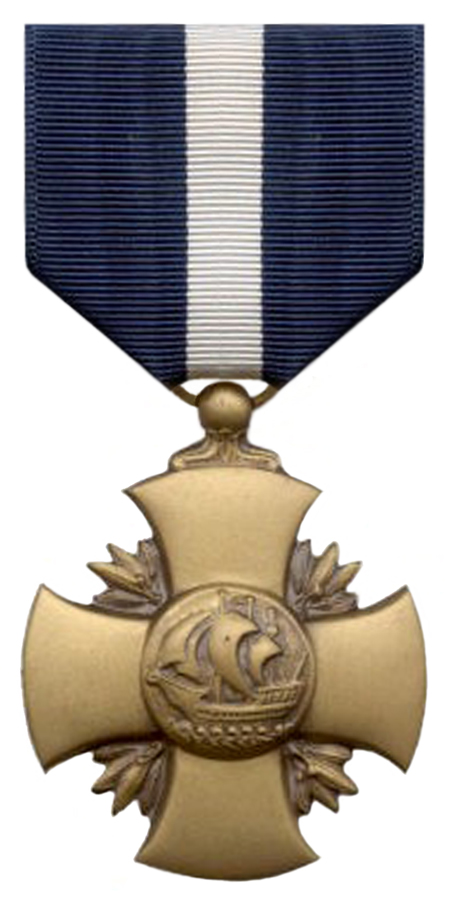

For extraordinary heroism in action against the enemy at Iwo Jima on Feb. 21, 1945 as a hospital corpsman attached to a Marine Rifle platoon. During a furious assault by his company upon a strongly defended enemy zone at the base of Mt. Suribachi, Bradley observed a Marine infantryman fall wounded in an open area under a pounding barrage by mortars, interlaced with a merciless crossfire from Machine guns. With complete disregard for his own safety, he ran through the intense fire to the side of the fallen Marine, examined his wounds and ascertained that an immediate administration of plasma was necessary to save the man's life. Unwilling to subject any of his comrades to the danger to which he had so valiantly exposed himself, he signaled would-be assistants to remain where they were. Placing himself in a position to shield the wounded man, he tied a plasma unit to a rifle planted upright in the sand and continued his life saving mission. The Marine's wounds bandaged and the condition of shock relieved by plasma, Bradley pulled the man thirty yards through intense enemy fire to a position of safety. His indomitable spirit, dauntless initiative, and heroic devotion to duty were an inspiration to those with whom he served and were in keeping with the highest tradition of the United States Naval Service.

== Movie part and portrayals ==
Bradley played and was portrayed as an American flag raiser in the following films (prior to his 2016 second flag raiser identification correction:

- 1949: Sands of Iwo Jima, starring John Wayne. Bradley, Ira Hayes, and Rene Gagnon participated once in the film by raising the America flag in the flag raising scene on Mount Suribachi.
- 1961: The Outsider, starring Tony Curtis as Ira Hayes. John Bradley was played by Forrest Compton.
- 2006: Flags of Our Fathers. John Bradley was portrayed as a young man by Ryan Phillippe and as an elder by George Grizzard.

== Legacy ==
The following are named in memory of Bradley:

- The John H. Bradley Branch Health Clinic (Marine Corps Officer Candidate School) at Marine Corps Base Quantico (1995) in Quantico, Virginia.
- The John Bradley Memorial (2000), Wisconsin State Historical Marker and Site at Appleton West High School, Appleton, Wisconsin.
- Doc Bradley Hall (2012) at Camp Johnson's Field Medical Training Battalion-East's school located four miles south of Marine Corps Base Camp Lejeune in Jacksonville, North Carolina.

== See also ==
- United States Navy Hospital Corpsman
