= Flags of Our Fathers =

Book by James Bradley and Ron Powers

- First edition cover
- Author: James Bradley; Ron Powers
- Language: English
- Genre: Non-fiction
- Publisher: Bantam Books
- Publication date: 2000
- Publication place: United States
- Media type: Print
- ISBN: 0-553-11133-7

Flags of Our Fathers (2000) is a book by James Bradley with Ron Powers about his father, Navy corpsman John Bradley, and five United States Marines, who were made famous by Joe Rosenthal’s Raising the Flag on Iwo Jima photograph. The story follows the lives of Bradley, Rene Gagnon, Ira Hamilton Hayes, Michael Strank, Harlon Henry Block, and Franklin Runyon Sousley. The five Marines were a part of Easy Company, 2nd Battalion, 28th Marines, 5th Marine Division. Strank was a sergeant, Block was a corporal who reported to Strank, and the rest of the Marines were privates first class. John Bradley was a Navy corpsman who administered first aid to Easy Company.

The book is focused mainly on the Battle of Iwo Jima and the Marines who made the battle famous. The fighting on Iwo Jima was the only time in all of WWII in which US Marines suffered more casualties than the Japanese. Whilst the battle was still raging Rosenthal's photograph of the Marines was released and overnight gained the attention of the whole nation. In the following weeks Strank, Block, and Sousley were killed in battle and their families were notified. Bradley, Gagnon, and Hayes were sent on the 7th War Bond Drive and became public heroes. Even though the war for them was finished and they had raised money for their country, their fight was far from over. Many of the Marines had a very hard time moving on with life after their experiences in war and the book sheds light on some of these hardships.

== Critical reception ==
The book spent 46 weeks on The New York Times nonfiction bestseller list, spending six weeks at number one.

== Film adaptation ==
Shortly after the book's publication, Steven Spielberg acquired the option for the film rights via DreamWorks Pictures. The film adaptation Flags of Our Fathers, which debuted in the U.S. on October 20, 2006, was directed by Clint Eastwood and produced by Eastwood, Steven Spielberg, and Robert Lorenz, with a screenplay written by William Broyles, Jr. and Paul Haggis. All but Boyles would assume similar roles for a companion piece film, Letters from Iwo Jima, which was released later that year and focuses on the Japanese side of the conflict.

== Flag-raiser identity corrections ==
Two of the six Marines featured in the book have since been determined not to be in the famous photograph. Following an investigation, in 2016 the Marine Corps announced that the man previously identified as John Bradley had in fact been (then Private First Class) Harold Schultz, and in 2019, the Corps announced that the man previously identified as Rene Gagnon had in fact been Marine Corporal Harold Keller.

James Bradley was initially surprised to hear that the Marine Corps had started an investigation into the identities of the men in the flag-raising photo, but said "I'm interested in facts and truths, so that’s fine, but I don’t know what’s happening." Soon after the announcement of the investigation, Bradley said he no longer believed his father had been in the photograph, citing research originally published in the Omaha World-Herald in 2014.
