= To the Shores of Iwo Jima =

1945 short film

To The Shores of Iwo Jima
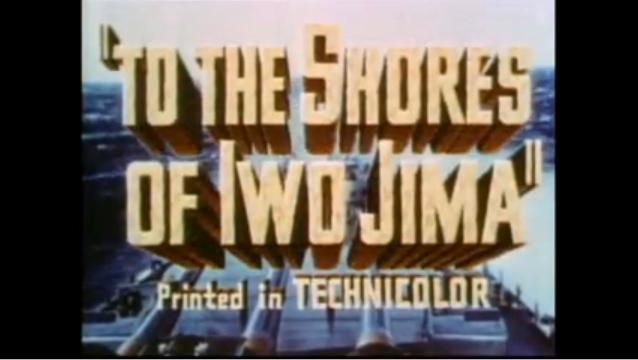
- Produced by: Milton Sperling
- Edited by: Rex Steele
- Production companies: United States Marine Corps; Warner Bros. Pictures
- Distributed by: United Artists
- Release date: 1945
- Running time: 20 minutes
- Country: United States
- Language: English

To the Shores of Iwo Jima is a 1945 Kodachrome color short war film produced by the United States Navy and United States Marine Corps. It documents the Battle of Iwo Jima, and was the first time that American audiences saw in color the footage of the famous flag raising on Iwo Jima.

== Overview ==
The film follows the servicemen through the battle in rough chronological order, from the bombardment of the island by warships and carrier-based airplanes to the final breakdown of resistance. Although it shows the taking of Mount Suribachi, it then switches to the footage of the second flag raising.

The film ends by acknowledging the 4,000 who had died in the month-long battle, and tells the audience that their deaths were not in vain, showing a bomber aircraft taking off from the island for a mission over Japan.

== Production notes ==
Four cameramen, including USMC Sgt. Bill Genaust (who shot the flag raising sequence), were killed in action. Ten other camera operators were wounded.

It was partially filmed in Wildwood Regional Park in Thousand Oaks, California.

== Award nominations ==
The film was nominated for an Academy Award for Best Documentary Short.

== Film ==
Joint restoration by the National Archives and Records Administration and the Academy Film Archive

Reel 1

Reel 2

== See also ==
- 16 mm film
- List of Allied Propaganda Films of World War 2
- List of films in the public domain in the United States
