= Mount Suribachi =

Cinder cone on the island of Iwo Jima, Japan

Suribachi
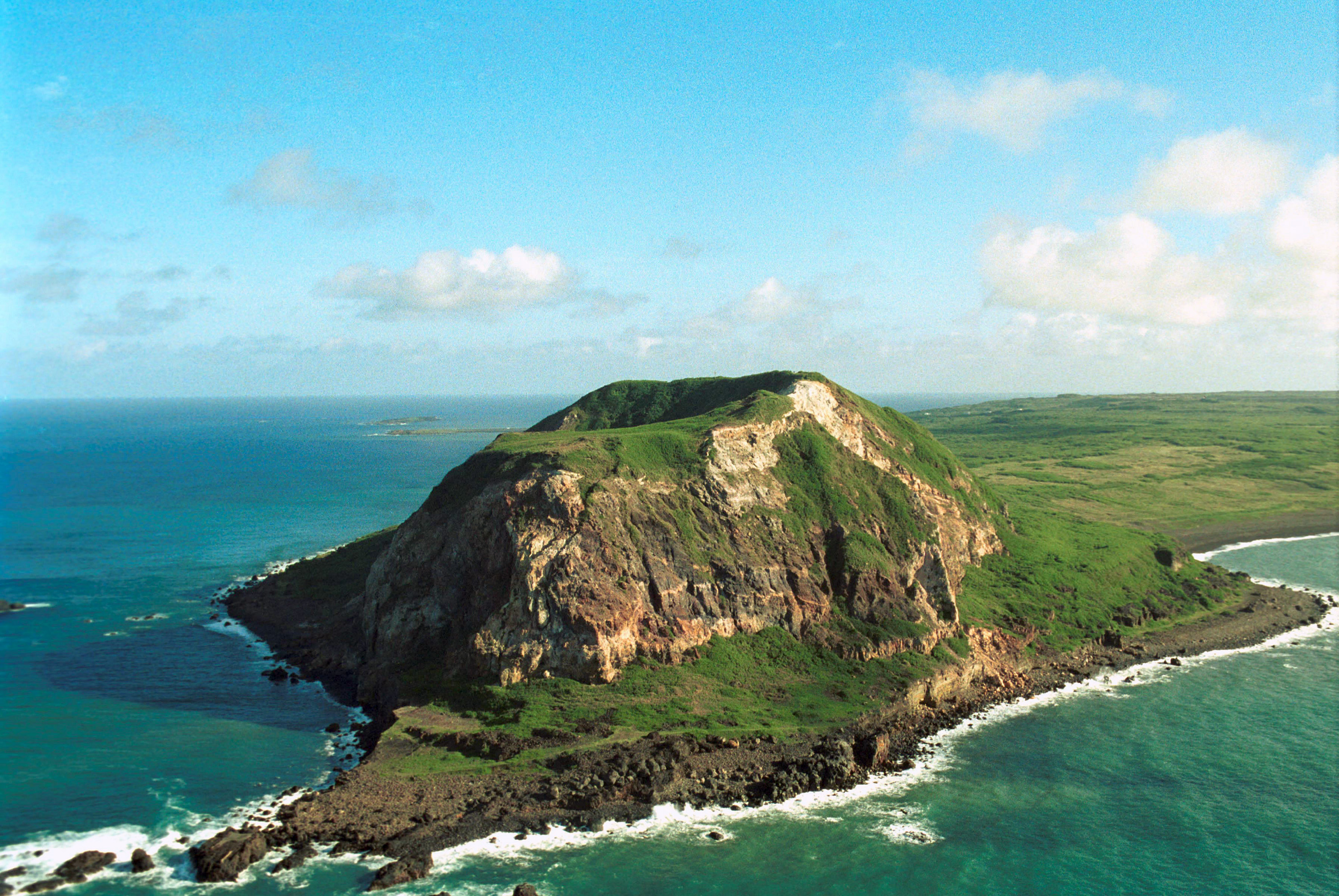
- Mount Suribachi as seen in 2001

Highest point
- Elevation: 169 m (554 ft)
- Prominence: 169 m (554 ft)
- Coordinates: 24°45′01″N 141°17′20″E

Geography
- Location within North Pacific
- Location: Iwo Jima, Japan
- Parent range: Volcano Islands

Geology
- Mountain type: Cinder cone
- Volcanic zone: Volcano Islands
- Last eruption: May 2, 2012

Mount Suribachi (摺鉢山, Suribachiyama) is a 169-metre (554 ft)-high hill on the southwest end of Iwo Jima in the northwest Pacific Ocean under the administration of Ogasawara Subprefecture, Tokyo Metropolis, Japan.

The hill's name derives from its shape, resembling a suribachi or grinding bowl. It is also known as "Mount Pipe" (パイプ山, paipu-yama), since the volcanic gas and water vapor that rolls in from the summit, alongside the rest of the island, give the appearance of a smoking pipe when viewed from the sea.

Joe Rosenthal's iconic World War II photograph, Raising the Flag on Iwo Jima, depicting United States Marines raising an American flag, was taken at the mountain's peak during the Battle of Iwo Jima in 1945. Ammunition ship USS Suribachi was named after this mountain.

== Geology ==
Geologically, the mountain is a cinder cone of andesite, formed by volcanic activity. It is thought that the mountain is a dormant vent to a still active volcano (designated Iō-tō, the name of the island as a whole). From 1889 to 1957, the Japanese government recorded sixteen eruptions on the peak. One eruption lasted for sixty-five minutes, and created a crater with a diameter of 35 meters and a depth of fifteen meters on the runway near the former airfield from World War II. The Japan Meteorological Agency reported that on May 2, 2012, a small eruption caused water discoloration to the northeast, and confirmed the appearance of a new fumarole.

== History ==
During World War II, the Japanese built tunnel and bunker systems in and on Mount Suribachi. In February 1945, United States Marines invaded the island and initiated a major battle. For the United States, Iwo Jima was an important strategic point between the United States and mainland Japan, needed for its close proximity to Japan as an airstrip for supporting aircraft in Japanese mainland bombing operations but became useful for damaged B-29s returning to the Mariana Islands from bombing Japan, a status that resulted in severe fighting that led to over 20,000 American casualties and close to 20,000 Japanese killed.

== In popular culture ==
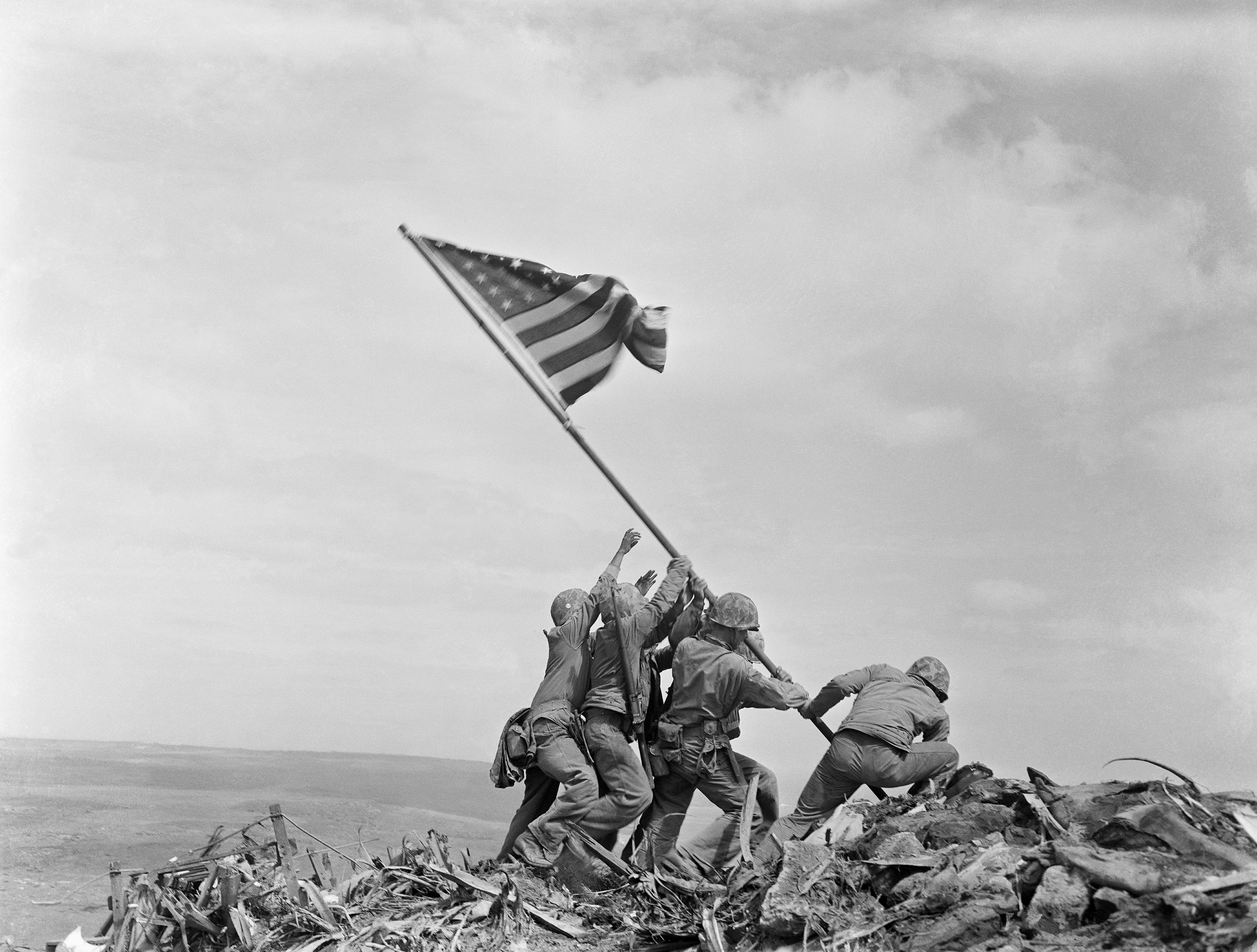
U.S. Marines raising the American flag on Mount Suribachi during the Battle of Iwo Jima

- During the Battle of Iwo Jima, Marines captured Mount Suribachi and raised a small American flag. Their officers ordered it replaced with a larger one, and photographer Joe Rosenthal took his famous picture Raising the Flag on Iwo Jima. The photograph has become an iconic image and is depicted as a large statue at the Marine Corps War Memorial.
- The 1949 film Sands of Iwo Jima, directed by Allan Dwan and starring John Wayne, follows a United States Marine rifle squad preparing for battle at Iwo Jima. The 2006 films Letters from Iwo Jima and Flags of Our Fathers, directed by Clint Eastwood, treat the theme of this Pacific battle and present the positions of both belligerents in this conflict.

== See also ==
- Naval Base Iwo Jima
