= Harold Schultz =

United States Marine (1925–1995)

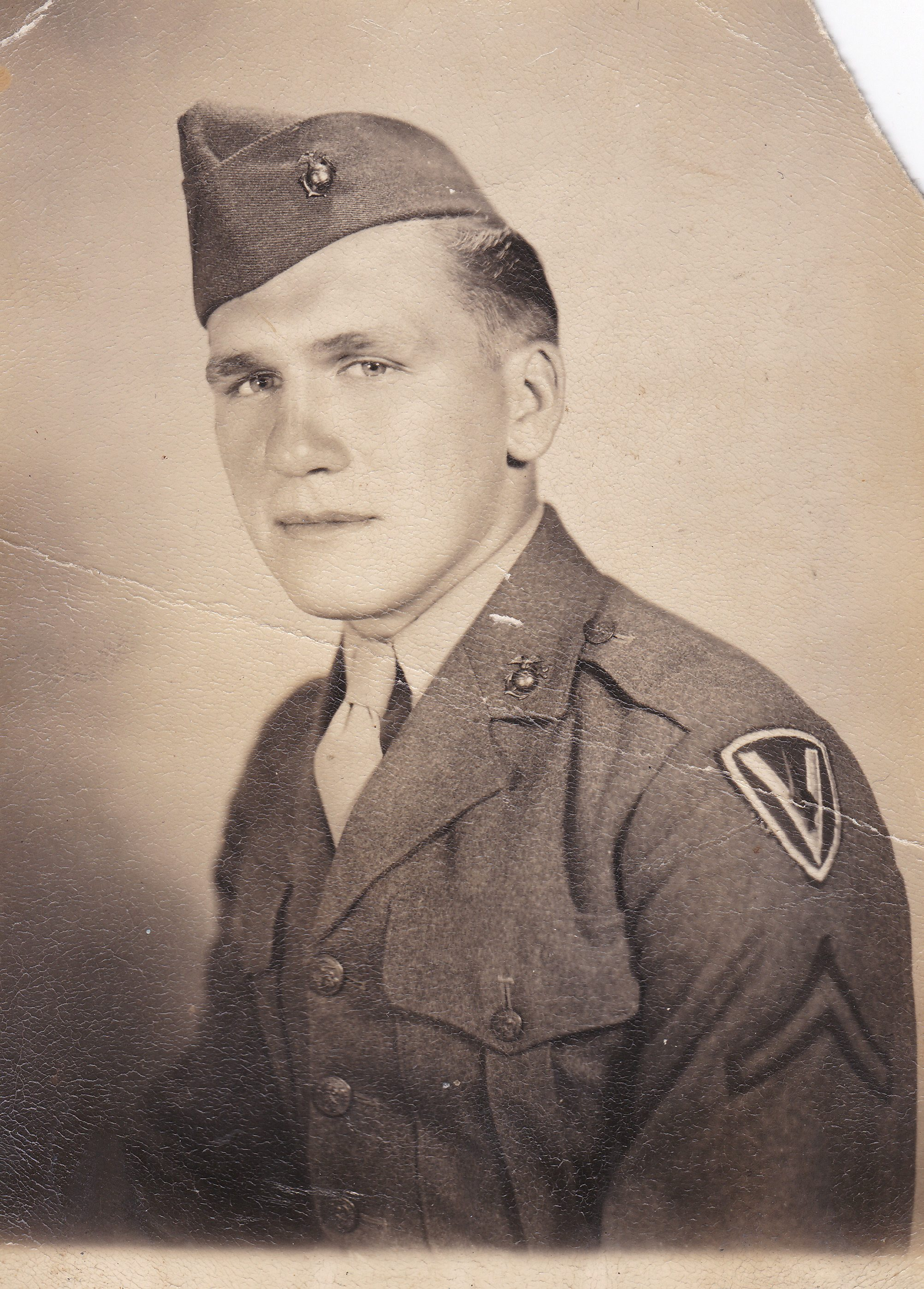
- Born: January 28, 1925; Detroit, Michigan, U.S.
- Died: May 16, 1995 (aged 70); Los Angeles, California, U.S.
- Burial place: Hollywood Forever Cemetery, Hollywood, California
- Military career
- Allegiance: United States
- Branch: United States Marine Corps
- Service years: 1943–1945
- Rank: Corporal
- Units: 2nd Battalion, 28th Marines, 5th Marine Division
- Conflicts: World War II; Battle of Iwo Jima (WIA)
- Awards: Purple Heart; Combat Action Ribbon

Harold Henry Schultz (January 28, 1925 – May 16, 1995) was a United States Marine corporal who was wounded in action during the Battle of Iwo Jima in World War II. He was a member of the patrol that captured the top of Mount Suribachi and raised the first U.S. flag on Iwo Jima on February 23, 1945. Though he was not a raiser of the first flag, he was one of the six Marines who raised the larger replacement flag on the mountaintop the same day as shown in the iconic photograph Raising the Flag on Iwo Jima. Schultz was the last surviving person in the photograph.

The first flag flown over Mount Suribachi at the south end of Iwo Jima was regarded to be too small to be seen by the thousands of Marines fighting on the other side of the mountain, so it was replaced by the second one. Although there were photographs taken of the first flag flying on Mount Suribachi including some of Schultz, there is no photograph of Marines raising the first flag. The second flag-raising became famous and took precedence over the first flag-raising after copies of the second flag-raising photograph appeared in newspapers two days later. The second flag-raising was also filmed in color.

Schultz was not recognized as one of the second flag-raisers until the Marine Corps announced on June 23, 2016, after an investigation, that he was in the historic photograph which was taken by combat photographer Joe Rosenthal of the Associated Press. The Marine Corps also stated that Schultz was incorrectly identified as Private First Class Franklin Sousley in the photograph. Sousley himself was also incorrectly identified as Navy corpsman John Bradley, who they determined is not in the photo. Schultz is one of three Marines in the photograph who were not originally identified as flag raisers.

The Marine Corps War Memorial in Arlington, Virginia, is modeled after the historic photograph of six Marines raising the flag on Iwo Jima.

== Biography ==
Harold Schultz was born and raised in Detroit, the son of Karl Albert (1893–1956) and Marie Martha Schultz (1898–1985). He attended Southwestern High School, where he was a classmate of Stan Lopata. After being discharged from the Marines, he moved to Los Angeles and worked as a mail sorter for the United States Postal Service until retiring in 1981. Schultz never had children. In his youth he lost a fiancée named Mary to a brain tumor, and did not marry until his 60s, when he wed his neighbor Rita Reyes.

== U.S. Marine Corps ==
Schultz entered the Marine Corps Reserve on December 23, 1943, from Detroit, Michigan. He was a member Easy (E) Company, 2nd Battalion, 28th Marine Regiment, 5th Marine Division which was activated in 1944 and began training at Camp Pendleton. In September, the division was sent to Camp Tarawa near Hilo, Hawaii, for further training to prepare for the invasion of Iwo Jima. In January 1945, the division left Hawaii and sailed for Iwo Jima. Schultz participated in the battle of Iwo Jima, which began on February 19. On February 23, together with five Marines, he helped raise the second and larger flag atop Mount Suribachi that day. He was wounded in action on March 13 and evacuated off the island. He was honorably discharged with the rank of corporal on October 17, 1945.

=== Iwo Jima ===
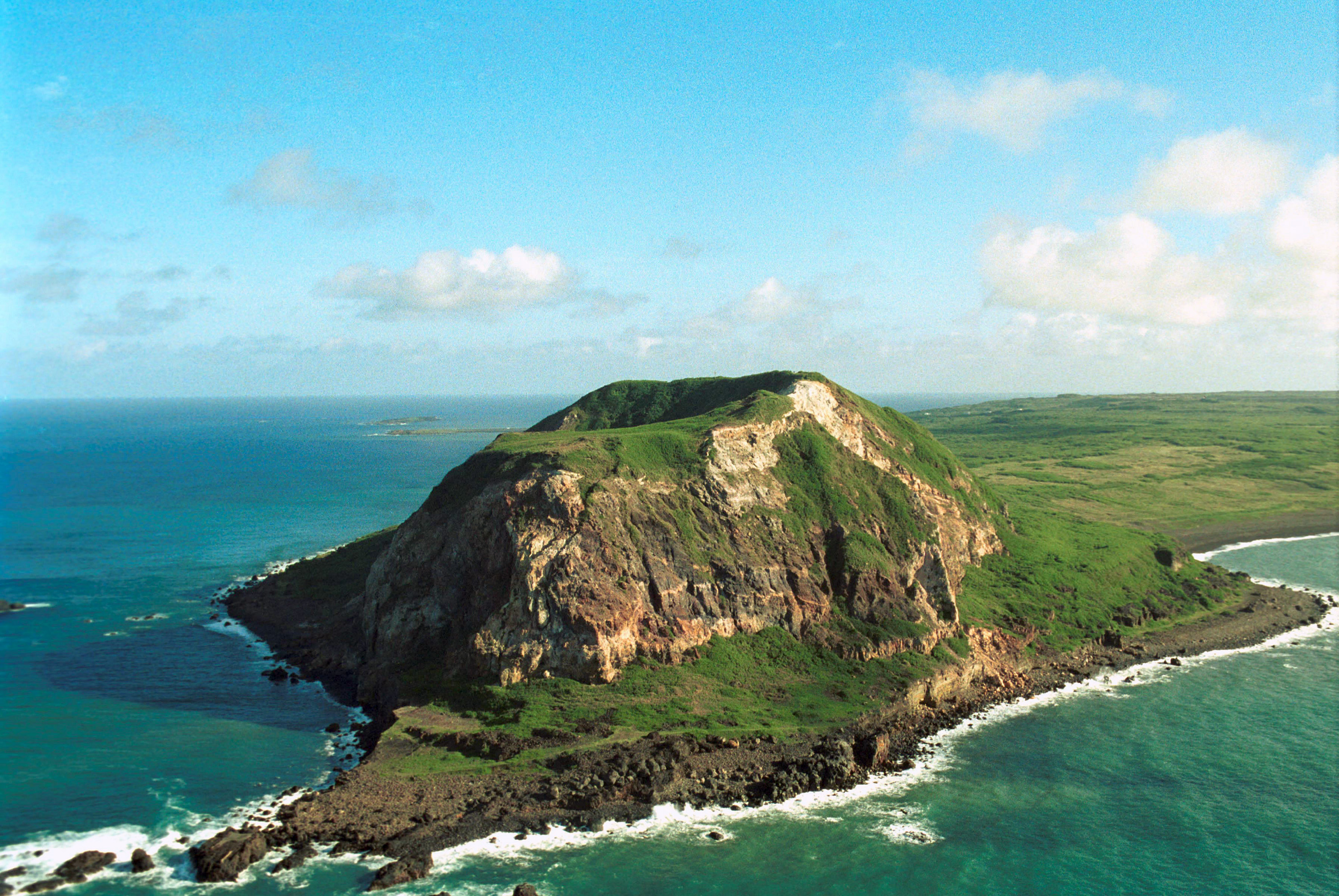
Mount Suribachi on south end of Iwo Jima

The 4th and 5th Marine Division assault forces landed on Iwo Jima, on February 19, 1945. The 28th Marines, 5th Marine Division landed on the southeast part of the island closest to where Mount Suribachi was located. The 28th Marines mission was to capture Mount Suribachi on the first day, but due to the heavy fighting they encountered from the Japanese, that did not happen. The 28th Marines reached the east side of the mountain on February 21, and by the evening of February 22, the regiment had most of the mountain surrounded.

On the morning of February 23, a 40-man patrol mostly from the Third Platoon, E Company, Second Battalion, 28th Marines, climbed up Mount Suribachi. After some sniper fire and a brief firefight at the rim of the volcano, they succeeded in capturing the mountain and raising the American flag on the summit. Pfc. Schultz was part of the patrol, and one of the Marines who guarded the flag raisers and some others with them during and after the flag raising. This flag was replaced hours later with a larger flag by four Marines from Second Platoon who came up to raise it, and Pfc. Schultz and Private First Class Harold Keller, who also was a member of Lt. Schrier's patrol. On March 13, Pfc. Schultz was wounded in action (WIA) and was evacuated off the island.

==== First flag raising ====
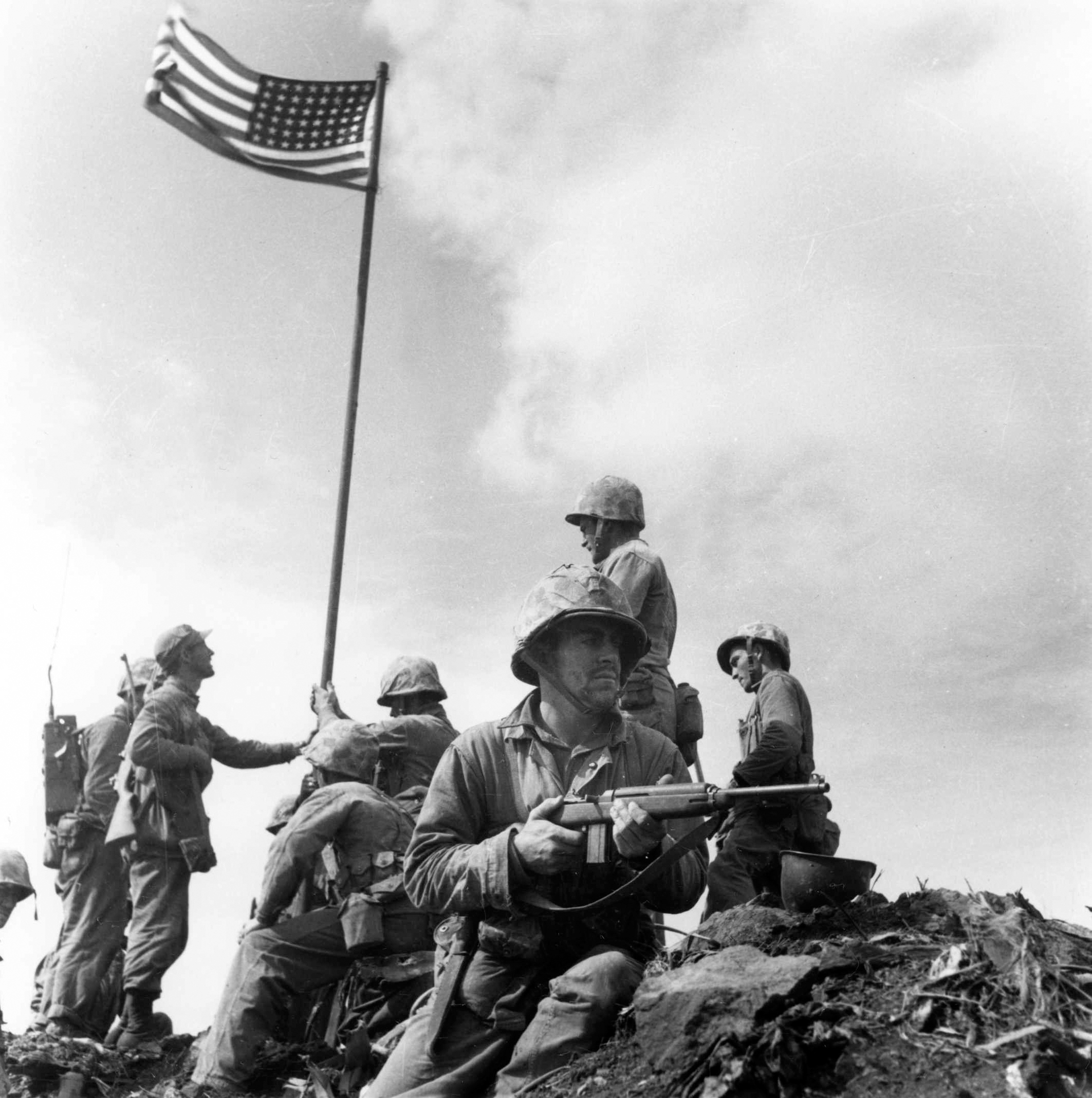
Marine Staff Sergeant Lou Lowery's photo of the first U.S. flag on Mount Suribachi. Pfc. Schultz (far left), PhM2c. Bradley, USN (center), holding pipe

At 8:00 am on February 23, 1945, Lieutenant Colonel Chandler W. Johnson, the Second Battalion, 28th Marines, commander, ordered a platoon size patrol to climb up Mount Suribachi to seize and occupy the crest. Captain Dave Severance, E Company's commander, assembled the remainder of Third Platoon and other members of the battalion to form a 40-man patrol that included two Navy corpsmen and stretcher bearers. First Lieutenant Harold Schrier, E Company's executive officer, volunteered to lead the patrol. Lt. Schrier was instructed by Lt. Col. Chandler to raise the battalion's American flag on top if he could, to signal that the summit was secure. The patrol left about 8:30. Along the way up which was difficult climbing at times, there was a small number of Japanese sniper shots. When Lt. Schrier and his men reached the rim of the volcano, there was a skirmish with the Japanese which they soon overcame. After a Japanese iron water pipe was found to use as a flagpole, the battalion's flag was tied to it by Lt. Schrier, Sergeant Henry Hansen, and Corporal Charles Lindberg. Once the flag was tied on and the flagstaff taken to the highest place on the crater, the flag was raised about 10:30 by Lt. Schrier, Platoon Sergeant Ernest Thomas, Sergeant Henry Hansen, and Cpl. Lindberg. Seeing the raising of the National colors immediately caused loud cheers from the Marines, sailors, and Coast Guardsmen on the south end of Iwo Jima and from the men on the ships near the beach. Due to the terrific winds and soft ground on the mountaintop, PhM2c. John Bradley, Easy Company's, Third Platoon corpsman, pitched in with Private Phil Ward to help make the flagstaff stay vertical.

Staff Sergeant Lou Lowery, a Marine photographer for The Leatherneck magazine and the only photographer who accompanied the patrol, took several photos of the first flag before and after it was raised. The last photo he took was before a Japanese grenade almost killed him (his camera was broken). The Marine Corps did not allow any of these photos to be published until 1947, in The Leatherneck. Platoon Sgt. Thomas was killed on March 3, Sgt. Hansen was killed on March 1, and Cpl. Lindberg was wounded on March 1.

==== Second flag raising ====
Marine Sergeant Bill Genaust's color film of the second flag-raising

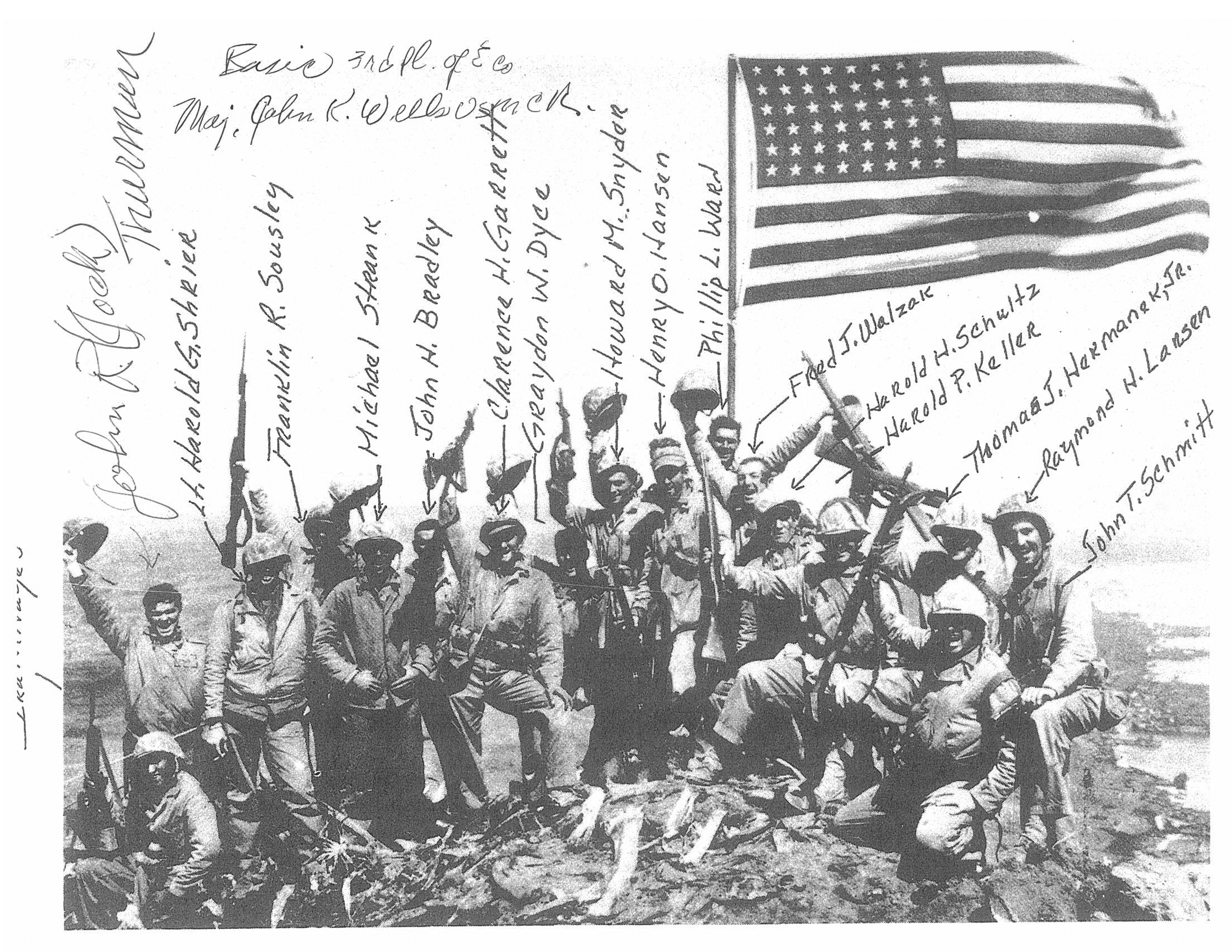
Pfc. Schultz is fifth from right in Joe Rosenthal's "Gung Ho" photo

Two hours after the first flag was raised on Mount Suribachi, Marine Corps leaders decided that in order for the American flag to be better seen on the other side of Mount Suribachi by the thousands of Marines fighting there to capture the island, another larger flag should be flown on Mount Suribachi (Lt. Colonel Chandler Johnson also wanted to secure the flag for his battalion). On orders from Lt. Col. Chandler, Captain Severance ordered Sgt. Michael Strank a rifle squad leader from Second Platoon, to take three Marines from his squad up to the top of Mount Suribachi to raise the second flag. Strank chose Corporal Harlon Block, Private First Class Ira Hayes, and Private First Class Franklin Sousley. Private First Class Rene Gagnon, a Second Battalion runner (messenger) for E Company, was ordered to take the replacement flag up the mountain and return with the first flag which was flying on top to the battalion adjutant.

Once Pfc. Gagnon, and Sgt. Strank with his three Marines who were carrying communication wire (or supplies), made it to the top, Pfc. Hayes and Pfc. Sousley found a Japanese steel pipe to attach the flag on. After the two Marines took the pipe to Sgt. Strank and Cpl. Block near the first flag, the second flag was attached to it. As the four Marines were about to raise the flag, Sgt. Strank yelled out for two Marines from Lt. Schrier's patrol (Pfc. Schultz and Pfc. Keller) to help them raise it. Under Lt. Schrier's orders, the second flag was raised by Sgt. Strank, Cpl. Block, Pfc. Hayes, Pfc. Sousley, Pfc. Schultz, and Pfc. Keller, as the first flagstaff was lowered by Pfc. Gagnon and three Marines. In order to keep the flagstaff in a vertical position, the four Marines held it while rocks were added by Pfc. Schultz and Pfc. Keller (and others) around the base of the flagstaff. Some Marines then stabilized the flagstaff with three guy-ropes.

Associated Press combat photographer Joe Rosenthal had climbed up the mountain with two Marine photographers (Marine Sgt. Bill Genaust and Pvt. Robert Campbell) in time to photograph the first flag while it was still up. This also enabled him to take a black-and-white photograph of the second-flag raising; Rosenthals's second flag raising photograph started appearing in newspapers on Sunday, February 25, 1945. Other combat photographers, including Pfc. George Burns, an army photographer (from Yank Magazine) and a Coast Guard photographer, had also climbed up Mount Suribachi after the first flag raising to take pictures, including some of each flag flying. Lt. Col. Chandler was killed on Iwo Jima on March 2 and Sgt. Genaust, who filmed the second flag-raising in color, was killed in a cave on March 4. Sgt. Strank and Cpl. Block were killed on March 1, and Pfc. Sousley was killed on March 21.

== Marine Corps War Memorial ==
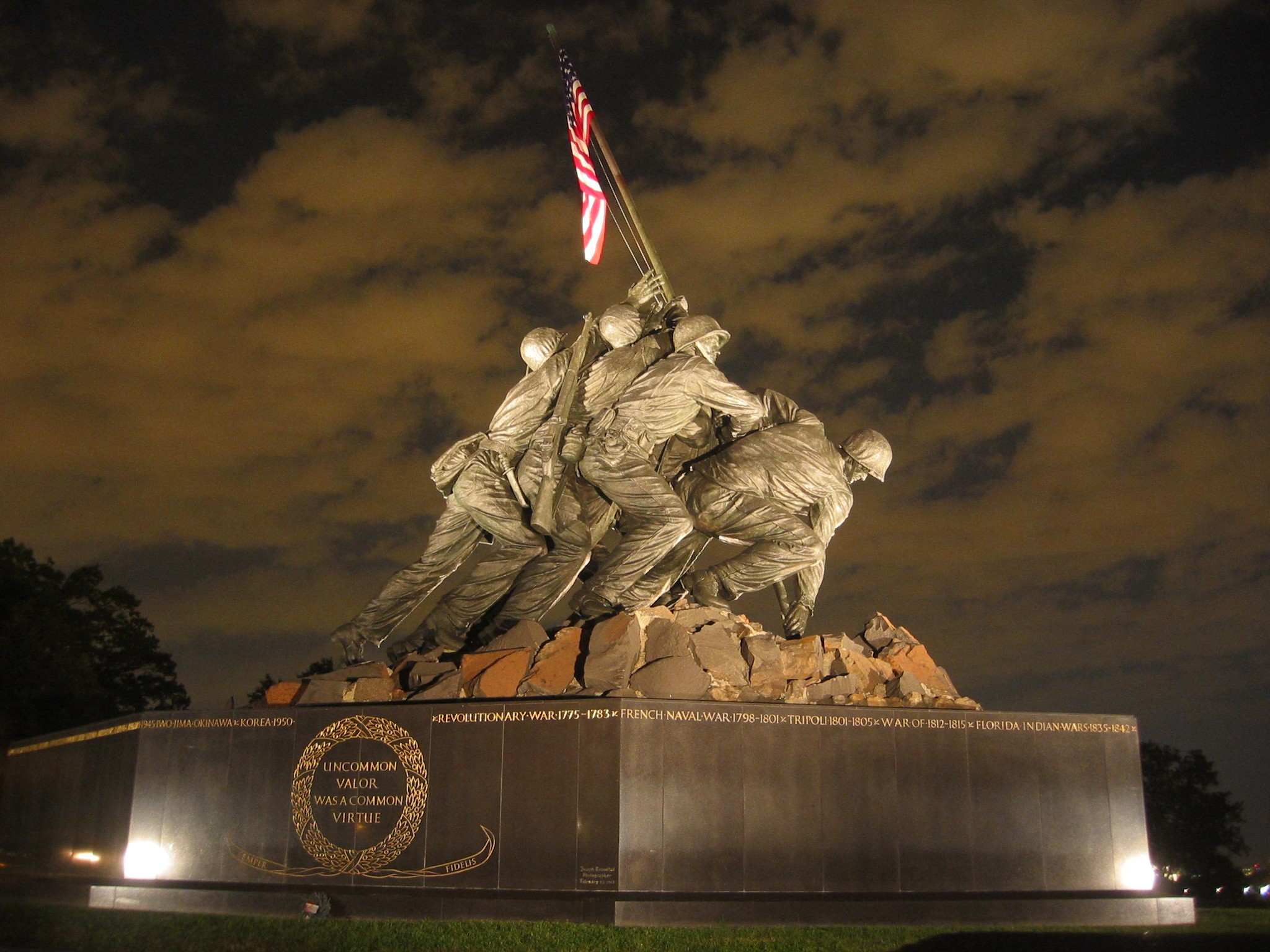
The U.S. Marine Corps War Memorial in Arlington, Virginia

The Marine Corps War Memorial (also known as the Iwo Jima Memorial) in Arlington, Virginia, was dedicated on November 10, 1954. The monument was sculptured by Felix de Weldon from the image of the second flag raising on Mount Suribachi. Since June 23, 2016, Harold Schultz is depicted as the fifth bronze statue from the base of the flagstaff on the memorial with the 32 foot (9.8 M) bronze statues of the other five flag raisers depicted on the memorial; Franklin Sousley is depicted as the third instead of the fifth bronze statue from the bottom of the flagstaff.

President Dwight D. Eisenhower sat upfront during the dedication ceremony with Vice President Richard Nixon, Secretary of Defense Charles E. Wilson, Deputy Secretary of Defense Robert Anderson, and General Lemuel C. Shepherd, the 20th Commandant of the Marine Corps. Ira Hayes, one of the three surviving flag raisers (Hayes, Schultz, and Keller) depicted on the monument, was also seated upfront with John Bradley (incorrectly identified as a flag raiser until June 23, 2016), Rene Gagnon (incorrectly identified as a flag raiser until October 16, 2019), Mrs Martha Strank, Mrs. Ada Belle Block, and Mrs. Goldie Price (mother of Franklin Sousley). Those giving remarks at the dedication included Robert Anderson, Chairman of Day; Colonel J.W. Moreau, U.S. Marine Corps (Retired), President, Marine Corps War Memorial Foundation; General Shepherd, who presented the memorial to the American people; Felix de Weldon; and Richard Nixon, who gave the dedication address. Inscribed on the memorial are the following words:

In Honor And Memory Of The Men of The United States Marine Corps Who Have Given Their Lives To Their Country Since 10 November 1775

== Second flag-raiser corrections ==
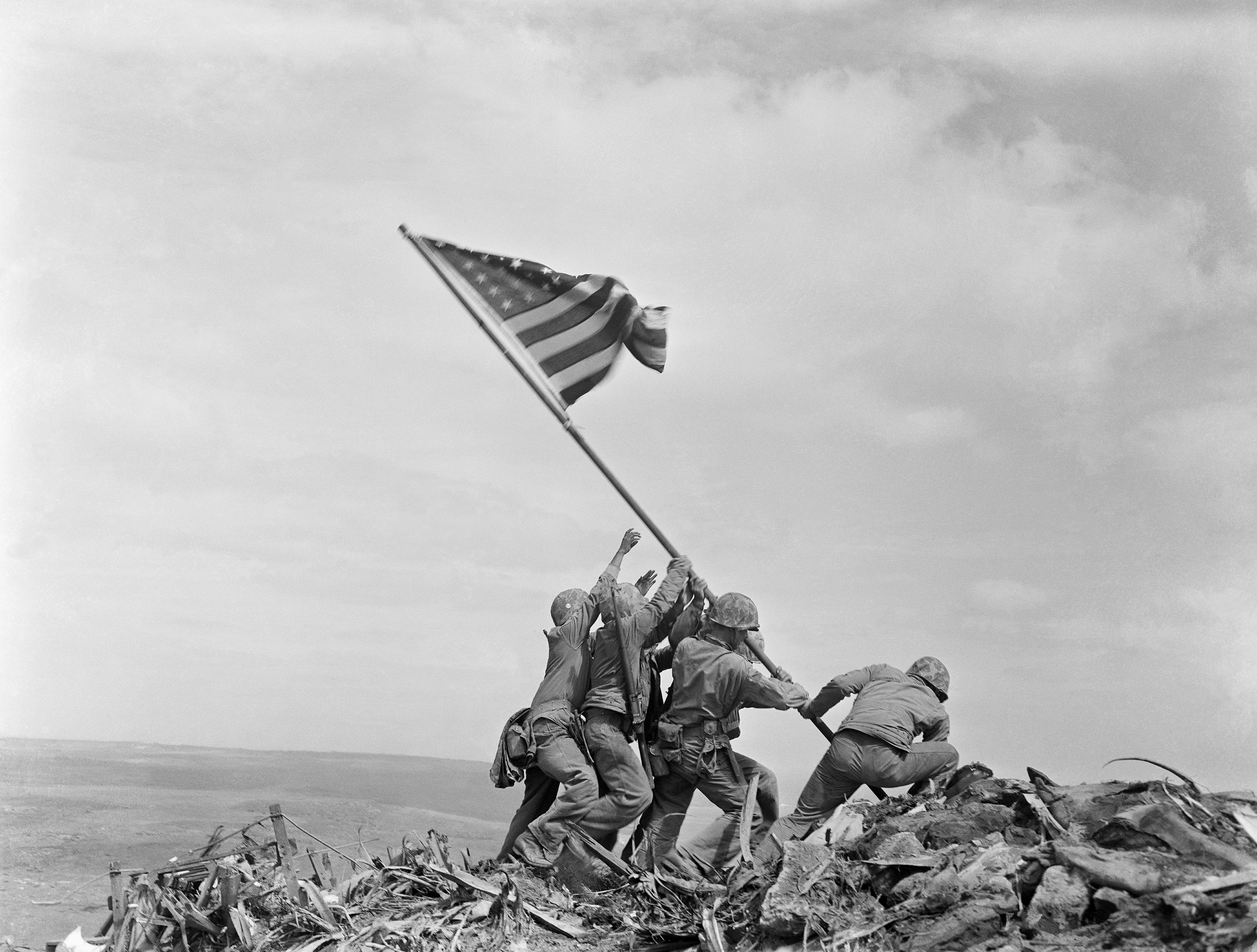
Second flag-raising photograph

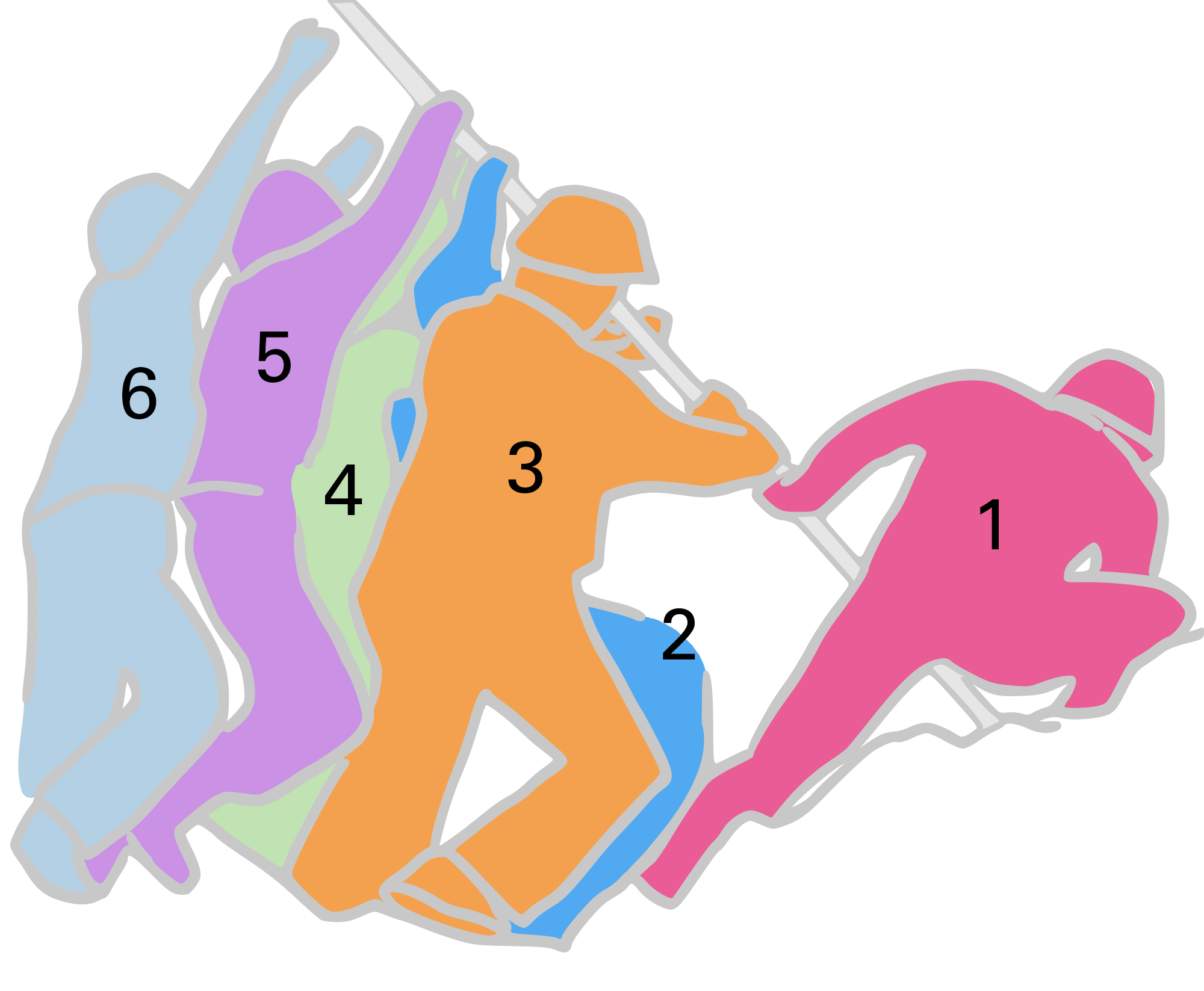
The six second flag-raisers: #1, Cpl. Harlon Block (KIA) #2, Pfc. Harold Keller #3, Pfc. Franklin Sousley (KIA) #4, Sgt. Michael Strank (KIA) #5, Pfc. Harold Schultz #6, Pfc. Ira Hayes

On March 20, 1945, President Franklin D. Roosevelt ordered the flag-raisers in Rosenthal's photograph to Washington, D.C. after the battle. Pfc. Gagnon was ordered to Washington and arrived on April 7. He was questioned the same day by a Marine public information officer about all the identities of the flag raisers in the photograph. He identified the six flag raisers as Sgt. Strank, Pfc. Sousley, Navy corpsman John Bradley, Pfc. Ira Hayes, and Sgt. Henry Hansen, and himself. He also said Sgt. Strank, Sgt. Hansen, and Pfc. Sousley were killed on Iwo Jima. After Pfc. Gagnon was questioned, Pfc. Hayes and PhM2c. Bradley were ordered to Washington. Bradley, who was recovering from his wounds at Oakland Naval Hospital in Oakland, California, was transferred to Bethesda Naval Hospital at Bethesda, Maryland, where he was shown Rosenthal's flag-raising photograph and was told he was in it. Both Bradley (on crutches) and Hayes arrived in Washington on April 19. They reported to the same officer and were questioned separately. PhM2c. Bradley agreed with all of the identities of the flag-raisers named by Pfc. Gagnon in the photograph including his own. Pfc. Hayes agreed with all of the identities named by Pfc. Gagnon except Sgt. Hansen, who he said was Cpl. Block at the base of the flagstaff. The Marine lieutenant colonel told Pfc. Hayes that the identities were made public on April 8 and would not be changed, and to not say anything about it anymore (the lt. colonel later denied that Pfc. Hayes ever told him that Cpl. Block was in the photograph).

A Marine Corps investigation of the six identities of the second flag-raisers began in December 1946 and concluded in January 1947 that it was Cpl. Block and not Sgt. Hansen at the base of the flagstaff in the Rosenthal photograph, and that no blame was to be placed on anyone in this matter. The identities of the other five second flag-raisers were confirmed.

The possibility that Harold Schultz was in the photograph first publicly surfaced in November 2014, when the Omaha World Herald published an article questioning the accepted identifications, based on research conducted by amateur historians Eric Krelle and Stephen Foley. The Marine Corps review board looked once more into the identities of the six second flag-raisers in Rosenthal's photograph. In June 2016, it concluded that Harold Schultz was in the photograph and John Bradley was not. Franklin Sousley, not Schultz, is now in the position initially ascribed to Bradley (fourth from left) in the photograph and Schultz is now in Sousley's former position (second from left) in the photograph. The identities of the other five flag-raisers were confirmed.

Schultz never publicly stated that he was one of the flag-raisers in the photograph during his lifetime. Analysts believe that he must have known he was in the iconic image but chose not to talk about it. His stepdaughter Dezreen MacDowell claimed that, during a family dinner in the early 1990s, when her mother was distracted, he told her that he was one of the flag raisers on Iwo Jima, and never spoke of it again.

In October 2019, a third Marine Corps investigation found that Harold Keller was in Rosenthal's photograph in place of Rene Gagnon (fifth from left). Gagnon, who carried the larger second flag up Mount Suribachi, helped lower the first flagstaff and removed the first flag at the time the second flag was raised. The identities of the other five flag raisers, including Schultz, were confirmed. Like Schultz, Keller never publicly mentioned his role as a flag-raiser or being in the photograph.

== Military awards ==
Schultz' military decorations and awards are the following:

Purple Heart Medal	Combat Action Ribbon	Navy Presidential Unit Citation
American Campaign Medal	Asiatic-Pacific Campaign Medal with one bronze star	World War II Victory Medal

== See also ==
- Battle of Iwo Jima
- Raising the Flag on Iwo Jima
