= Dave Severance =

US Marine Corps officer (1919–2021)

- Born: February 4, 1919; Milwaukee, Wisconsin, U.S.
- Died: August 2, 2021 (aged 102) La Jolla, California, U.S.
- Allegiance: United States of America
- Branch: United States Marine Corps
- Service years: 1938–1968
- Rank: Colonel
- Commands: Easy Company, 2nd Battalion, 28th Marines
- Conflicts: World War II; Bougainville campaign; Battle of Iwo Jima; Korean War; Vietnam War
- Awards: Silver Star; Distinguished Flying Cross; Air Medal (4)

Dave Elliott Severance (February 4, 1919 – August 2, 2021) was a United States Marine Corps colonel. During World War II, he served as the commanding officer of Easy Company, 2nd Battalion, 28th Marines and led his company in the battle of Iwo Jima. During the battle, Severance ordered his 3rd Platoon to scale Mount Suribachi and raise the flag at the summit.

== Early life ==
Severance was born in Milwaukee, Wisconsin, on February 4, 1919. He was raised in Greeley, Colorado before briefly attending college at the University of Washington. When he ran out of money for school, Severance enlisted in the Marine Corps. Upon graduating from boot camp, he served on board the USS Lexington (The Mighty Lex) aircraft carrier at sea. He was then assigned to the 8th Marine Regiment in San Diego before attending Paramarine training in July 1941.

== World War II ==
=== Paramarines ===
After the United States entered World War II, Sergeant Severance was sent to Officer Candidates School and commissioned as a second lieutenant. In 1943, Severance was deployed to the Pacific Theater with the Paramarines, and by November, his unit was taking part in the Bougainville campaign. At Bougainville, Severance proved himself in battle by leading his cut off platoon out of a Japanese ambush with minimal casualties.

In January 1944, the Paramarines withdrew from Bougainville and returned to San Diego. In February, the Paramarines were disbanded and Captain Severance was reassigned to 2nd Battalion, 28th Marines, 5th Marine Division, where he was appointed the Easy Company commander.

In September 1944, Severance and the rest of the 5th Marine Division left San Diego for Camp Tarawa, Hawaii. In January 1945, the division left Camp Tarawa, stopping for a brief liberty at Pearl Harbor, before sailing west across the Pacific Ocean bound for Iwo Jima. Captain Severance celebrated his 26th birthday at sea.

=== Battle of Iwo Jima ===
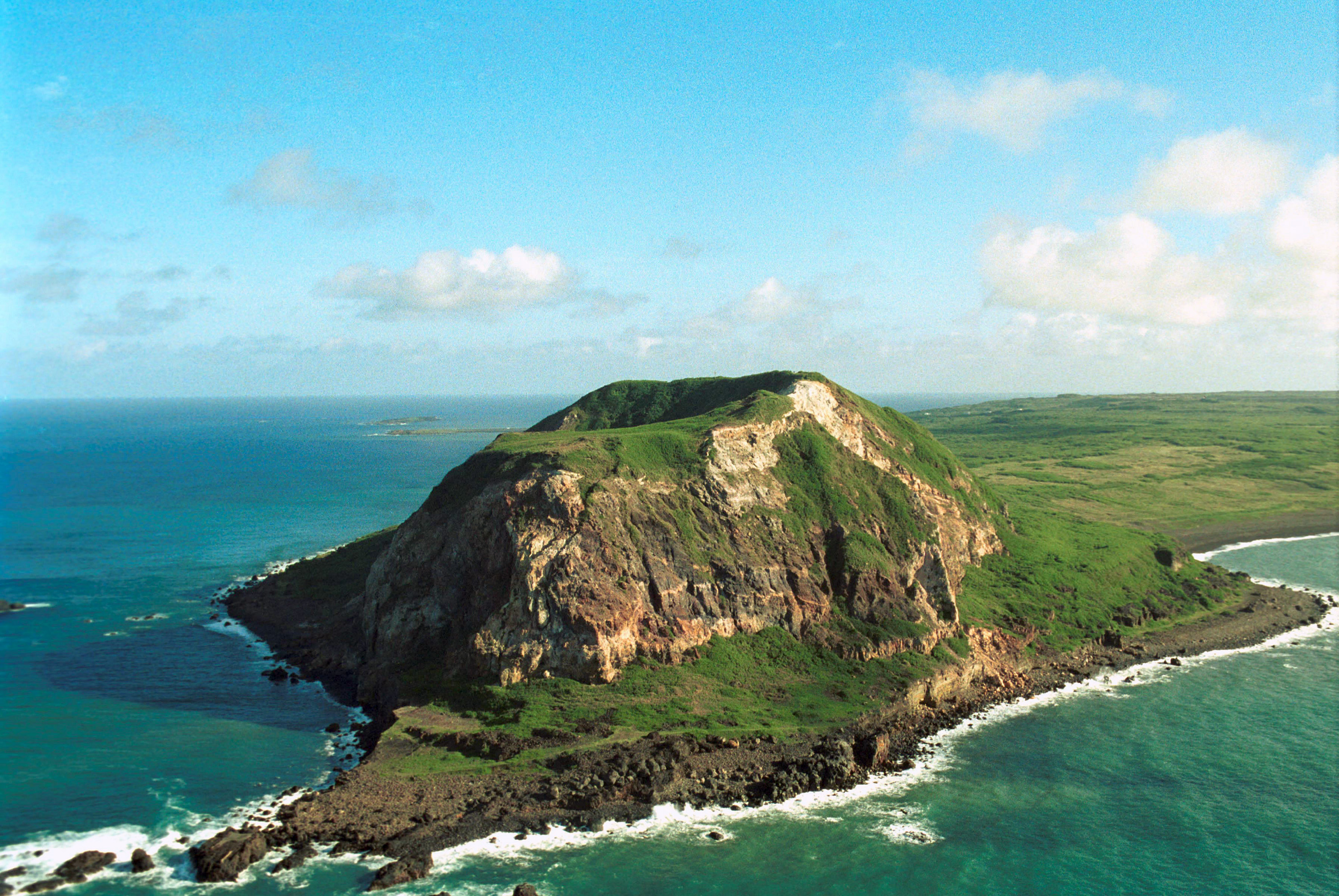
Mount Suribachi (pictured in 2001) is the dominant geographical feature of the island of Iwo Jima

At approximately 09:55 on February 19, 1945, Severance led Easy Company ashore with the twelfth wave at Green Beach One during the battle of Iwo Jima. Easy Company landed unopposed and was in the assembly area on the beach for roughly 20 minutes before the defending Japanese finally opened fire on the invasion force.

Easy Company's 2nd Platoon, led by Second Lieutenant Ed Pennell, landed off course and became separated. When Severance told Colonel Harry B. Liversedge that his company was not ready to move out off the beach because his 2nd Platoon was missing, Liversedge threatened Severance with a court martial if he did not find his missing platoon in the next five minutes. Severance located the platoon shortly after.

Severance led Easy Company off the beach under heavy fire and played a role in helping to cut Mount Suribachi off from the rest of the island before the day was over. By the end of February 21, Severance's company was positioned at the base of Suribachi.

On February 22, Navy planes bombed Suribachi and mistook Severance and his Marines for the Japanese. Severance was unable to have his location marked with flares as the bombs continued to fall closer to his position, and he radioed to Colonel Liversedge to stop the bombing. The planes were called off and Severance spent the rest of the day preparing for the assault up Mount Suribachi.

==== First flag raising ====
On February 23, Lieutenant Colonel Chandler W. Johnson, 2/28's commanding officer, ordered Severance to send one platoon up the face of Suribachi. Severance decided to send his 3rd Platoon up the mountain, along with 12 Marines from his Weapons Platoon. Severance ordered his executive officer, First Lieutenant Harold G. Schrier, to lead the platoon up Suribachi. Just before Schrier left with the platoon, Johnson handed him a 54 by 28 inch American flag and said "If you get to the top, put it up." The flag had been taken from the USS Missoula (APA-211) by the battalion adjutant, First Lieutenant George G. Wells. Severance later admitted that he thought he was sending the platoon up Suribachi to certain death.

Schrier led his platoon up Suribachi and raised the flag Johnson had given him. James Forrestal, the Secretary of the Navy, arrived at the beach just as the flag was raised. The morale among the Marines greatly increased upon seeing the flag and Forrestal said to General Holland Smith that "the raising of that flag on Suribachi means a Marine Corps for the next five hundred years." Forrestal was so excited that he then decided he wanted to keep the flag as a souvenir.

==== Second flag raising ====
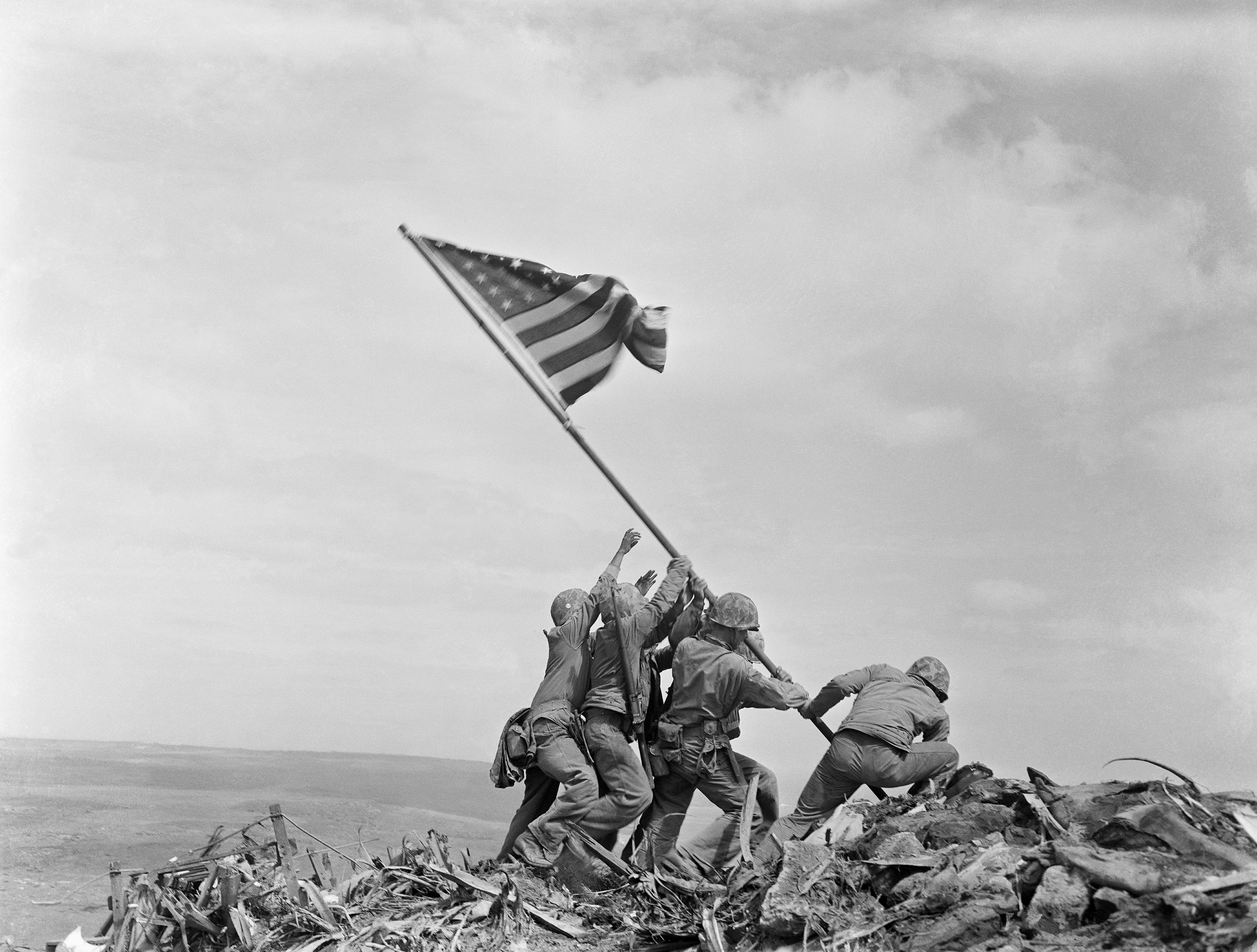
Raising the Flag on Iwo Jima, by Joe Rosenthal of the Associated Press

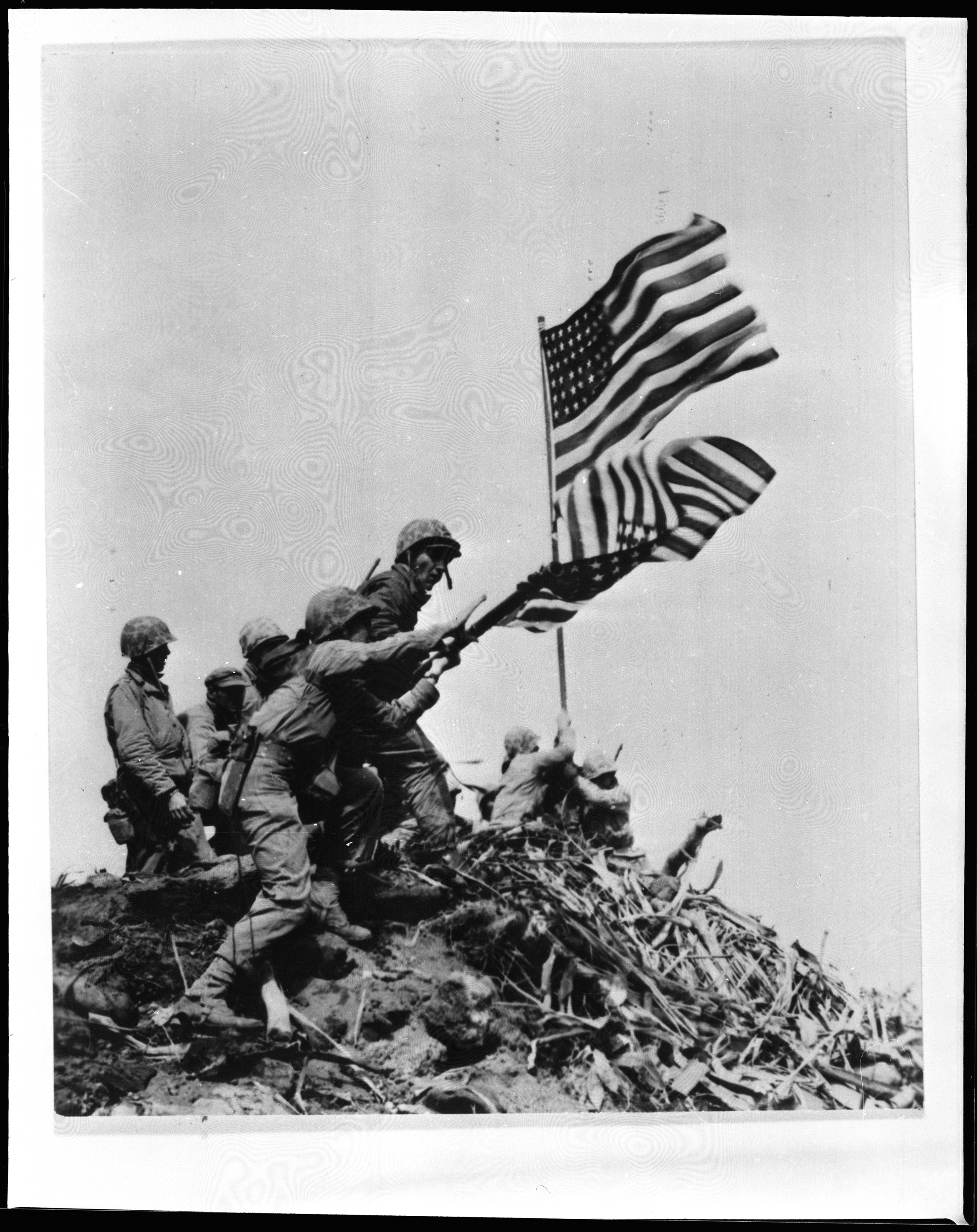
Marine Corps photo of the two flags on Mount Suribachi

When Lieutenant Colonel Johnson received word of Forrestal's wish, he angrily remarked "The hell with that!" Johnson wanted to retrieve the flag as soon as possible since he believed the flag belonged to his battalion. Johnson then sent his assistant operations officer, Second Lieutenant Ted Tuttle, down to the beach to secure a larger flag to raise over Suribachi.

Johnson then ordered Severance to have his Marines lay a telephone wire up to the top of Suribachi. Severance ordered four Marines from 2nd Platoon, Sergeant Michael Strank, Corporal Harlon Block, and Private First Classes Ira Hayes and Franklin Sousley to reel a telephone wire up the mountain from the battalion command post. He then sent his runner, Private First Class Rene Gagnon, to the battalion command post to obtain radio batteries for Schrier. As the five Marines arrived at the command post, Tuttle also returned to Johnson with a 96 by 56 inch flag which he had acquired from USS LST-779. Johnson handed the flag to Gagnon and then told Strank to raise the second flag and have Schrier "save the small flag for me."

Strank then led the small group up Suribachi; where Strank, Block, Hayes, Sousley, and Private First Classes Harold Schultz and Harold Keller raised the second flag. The second flag raising was captured in the famous photograph taken by Joe Rosenthal. The first flag was brought back down Suribachi and returned to Lieutenant Colonel Johnson, who promptly placed it in the battalion safe.

==== Later actions during battle ====
Severance continued leading Easy Company in the battle after the flag raising, advancing over the northeast end of the island. On March 1, Severance led his company in capturing a heavily defended ridge south of Nishi Village. He then held the ridge with his Marines despite a heavy barrage of enemy fire. For his actions that day, Severance was awarded the Silver Star. Mike Strank and Harlon Block were among those killed that day from Easy Company.

On March 2, Lieutenant Colonel Johnson was killed by a mortar round. On March 17, Severance began receiving requests to identify the Marines in the photograph of the second flag raising. He ignored the requests as his company was still fighting the battle. One of the flag raisers, Franklin Sousley, was killed a few days later on March 21. Shortly after Sousley was killed, Severance learned that his wife had given birth to a stillborn baby.

On March 26, Severance led his battered company off Iwo Jima. A total of 310 Marines and Navy corpsmen served with Easy Company during the battle. Only 50 walked off the island, an 84 percent casualty rate. Severance was never wounded during the battle, and he was the only Easy Company officer to walk off the line once the battle concluded.

After the battle, Severance returned to Camp Tarawa with the 5th Marine Division. He began training a new company in preparation of the invasion of Japan, but then the war ended. He then took part in occupation duty in Japan in late 1945 as the executive officer of 2/28.

== Post-war career and life ==
After returning to the United States, Severance attended flight training in April 1946. During the Korean War, he flew 69 combat missions and was awarded the Distinguished Flying Cross along with four Air Medals. Severance also served during the Vietnam War before retiring from the Marines with the rank of colonel in May 1968.

Upon retirement, Severance and his wife settled in La Jolla, California. In the 1980s, he began searching for surviving Easy Company Marines and organized multiple reunions. In the late 1990s, Severance gave a number of interviews to James Bradley while he was writing his book Flags of Our Fathers. Bradley's father, John Bradley, served with Easy Company as a corpsman and was originally identified as one of the flag raisers. Severance had also recommended John Bradley for the Navy Cross for his actions at Iwo Jima.

On February 4, 2019, Severance celebrated his 100th birthday. The Commandant of the Marine Corps, General Robert Neller, sent a letter to Severance on his birthday, stating "you played a crucial role in shaping the warrior ethos of our Corps."

Severance died on August 2, 2021, at his home in La Jolla. He was 102 years old and was buried at the Miramar National Cemetery in San Diego on September 15.

== Portrayal in film ==
Severance is featured in the 2006 movie Flags of Our Fathers. In the movie, Severance is played by American actor Neal McDonough. American actor Harve Presnell also played Severance as an older man in the film.

== See also ==
- Raising the Flag on Iwo Jima
- Battle of Iwo Jima
