= Chandler W. Johnson =

USMC Navy Cross recipient

Chandler Wilce Johnson
- Born: October 8, 1905; Fort Dodge, Iowa, U.S.
- Died: March 2, 1945 (aged 39); Iwo Jima, Japan
- Burial place: National Memorial Cemetery of the Pacific
- Spouse: Miriam Vane
- Children: Miriam (Sue) Johnson Goode
- Military career
- Allegiance: United States
- Branch: United States Marine Corps
- Service years: 1929–1945
- Rank: Lieutenant Colonel
- Nickname: Chaney
- Commands: 2nd Battalion, 28th Marines
- Conflicts: Banana Wars: Occupation of Nicaragua; World War II: Attack on Pearl Harbor; Guadalcanal campaign; Bougainville campaign; Battle of Iwo Jima †
- Awards: Navy Cross; Legion of Merit; Purple Heart; Presidential Unit Citation; Expeditionary Medal; Nicaraguan Campaign Medals; China Service Medal; American Defense Service Medal; Asiatic Pacific Campaign; American Campaign Medal; Victory Medal — World War II

Chandler Wilce Johnson (October 8, 1905 – March 2, 1945) was a highly decorated United States Marine Corps lieutenant colonel. He served as the commanding officer of 2nd Battalion, 28th Marines during the battle of Iwo Jima, leading his battalion in capturing Mount Suribachi which later led to the flag being raised over Iwo Jima. He was killed in action one week after the flag raising and was posthumously awarded the Navy Cross.

== Early life and career ==
Chandler W. Johnson was born on October 8, 1905, in Fort Dodge, Iowa. "Chaney” always wanted to be a Marine. He graduated from high school at age 16 and immediately enlisted. He went to Parris Island for basic and then to Guantanamo Bay, Cuba as a cook's assistant. When his mother finally tracked him down, in Santo Domingo, she got him into the Naval Academy (after 2 years of prep school).

In 1929, Johnson graduated from the United States Naval Academy at Annapolis, Maryland. Upon graduation, he was commissioned as a second lieutenant in the Marine Corps and attended training at the Marine Barracks in Philadelphia, Pennsylvania. He then attended further training at Naval Air Station Pensacola, Florida, and then at the Marine Barracks at Portsmouth Navy Yard, Virginia.

In April 1931, Johnson deployed to Nicaragua during the Banana Wars, remaining there until the end of 1932. From early 1933 to mid 1934, he was stationed at the Marine Barracks in Boston, Massachusetts.

In 1934 he married Miriam Vane in Philadelphia. They were then stationed in Quantico, VA. Johnson then attended courses at the Marine Barracks Quantico, Virginia, before he was briefly stationed at the Marine Barracks in Mare Island Navy Yard, California.

After a short stay in Pensacola, FL they transferred to Olongapo. From late 1935 until the end of 1936, First Lieutenant Johnson was stationed at Olongapo Naval Station in the Philippines. His daughter, Miriam (Sue) Chandler Johnson, was born on the base in 1936. In August 1936 the family moved to Shanghai where Chaney was assigned to one of the boats on the Yangtze River.

Throughout 1937, Johnson served with the 4th Marine Regiment in China. His wife and daughter were evacuated from Shanghai in 1937 when the Japanese invaded the city. In 1938, he returned to the Marine Barracks in Portsmouth, Virginia. In January 1939, Captain Johnson attended another course at Quantico, and later that year he was assigned to 1st Battalion, 6th Marines in San Diego, California.

== World War II ==
=== 3rd Defense Battalion ===
In mid 1940, Johnson was made the commanding officer of Battery I, 3rd Defense Battalion at Pearl Harbor, Hawaii. Johnson was with the 3rd Defense Battalion when the Japanese attacked Pearl Harbor on December 7, 1941, forcing the United States to enter World War II.

In late June and early July 1942, the 3rd Defense Battalion conducted several amphibious landing exercises in Hawaii. On August 7, Johnson landed with his battalion in support of the 1st Marine Division at Guadalcanal. The 3rd Defense Battalion left Guadalcanal for New Zealand on February 9, 1943. Johnson was awarded the Legion of Merit for his service during the Guadalcanal campaign.

Johnson later took part in the Bougainville campaign with the 3rd Defense Battalion from November 1943 until June 1944. The 3rd Defense Battalion was deactivated shortly afterwards, and Lieutenant Colonel Johnson was reassigned as the commanding officer of 2nd Battalion, 28th Marines, 5th Marine Division.

=== Battle of Iwo Jima ===
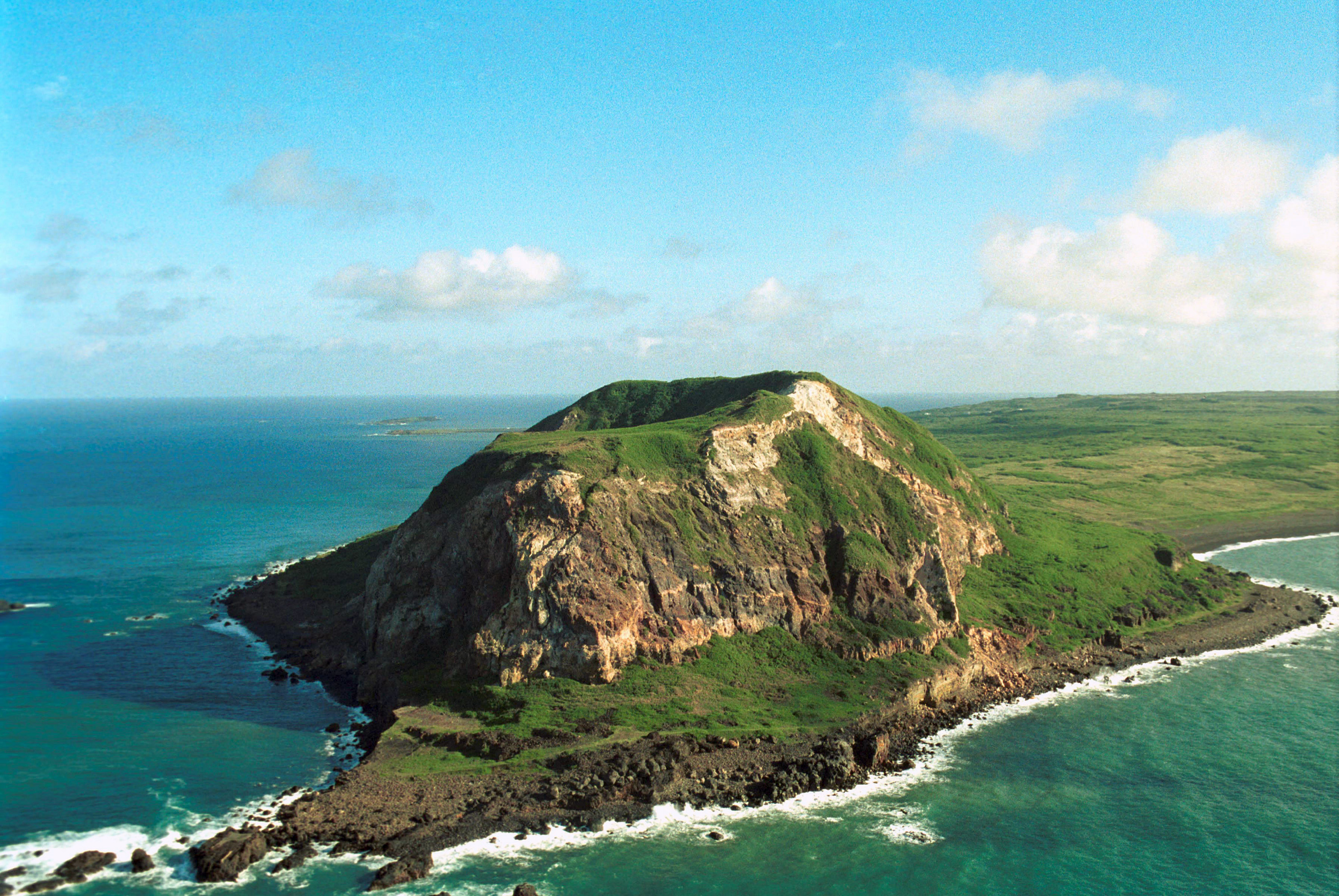
Mount Suribachi (pictured in 2001) is the dominant geographical feature of the island of Iwo Jima

On February 19, 1945, Johnson led 2/28 during the amphibious assault of Green Beach during the battle of Iwo Jima. Despite fanatical resistance from the defending Japanese, 2/28 managed to help cut Mount Suribachi off from the rest of the island by the end of the day.

On February 20, as Lieutenant Colonel Johnson ordered his Marines to advance toward Mount Suribachi, he said "It’s going to be a hell of a day in a hell of a place to fight the damned war!" His battalion suffered significant casualties and only advanced 200 yards that day. Johnson sent a message to 5th Marine Division headquarters in which he stated "enemy defenses much greater than expected. There was a pillbox every ten feet." By February 22, the Marines had surrounded Suribachi.

==== First flag raising ====
On February 23, Johnson ordered two four-man patrols to reconnoiter routes up to the summit of Mount Suribachi. A patrol from Fox Company, led by Sergeant Sherman B. Watson, successfully reached the top and came back down without drawing any enemy fire. Johnson then ordered the commander of Easy Company, Captain Dave Severance, to send a platoon up Suribachi. Severance in turn ordered First Lieutenant Harold G. Schrier to take 3rd Platoon up the mountain. Just before Schrier left with the platoon, Johnson handed him a 54 by 28 inch American flag and said "If you get to the top, put it up." The flag had been taken from the USS Missoula (APA-211) by the battalion adjutant, First Lieutenant George G. Wells.

Schrier led his platoon up Suribachi and raised the flag Johnson had given him. James Forrestal, the Secretary of the Navy, arrived at the beach just as the flag was raised. The morale among the Marines increased and Forrestal said to General Holland Smith that "the raising of that flag on Suribachi means a Marine Corps for the next five hundred years." Forrestal was so excited that he then decided he wanted to keep the flag as a souvenir.

==== Second flag raising ====
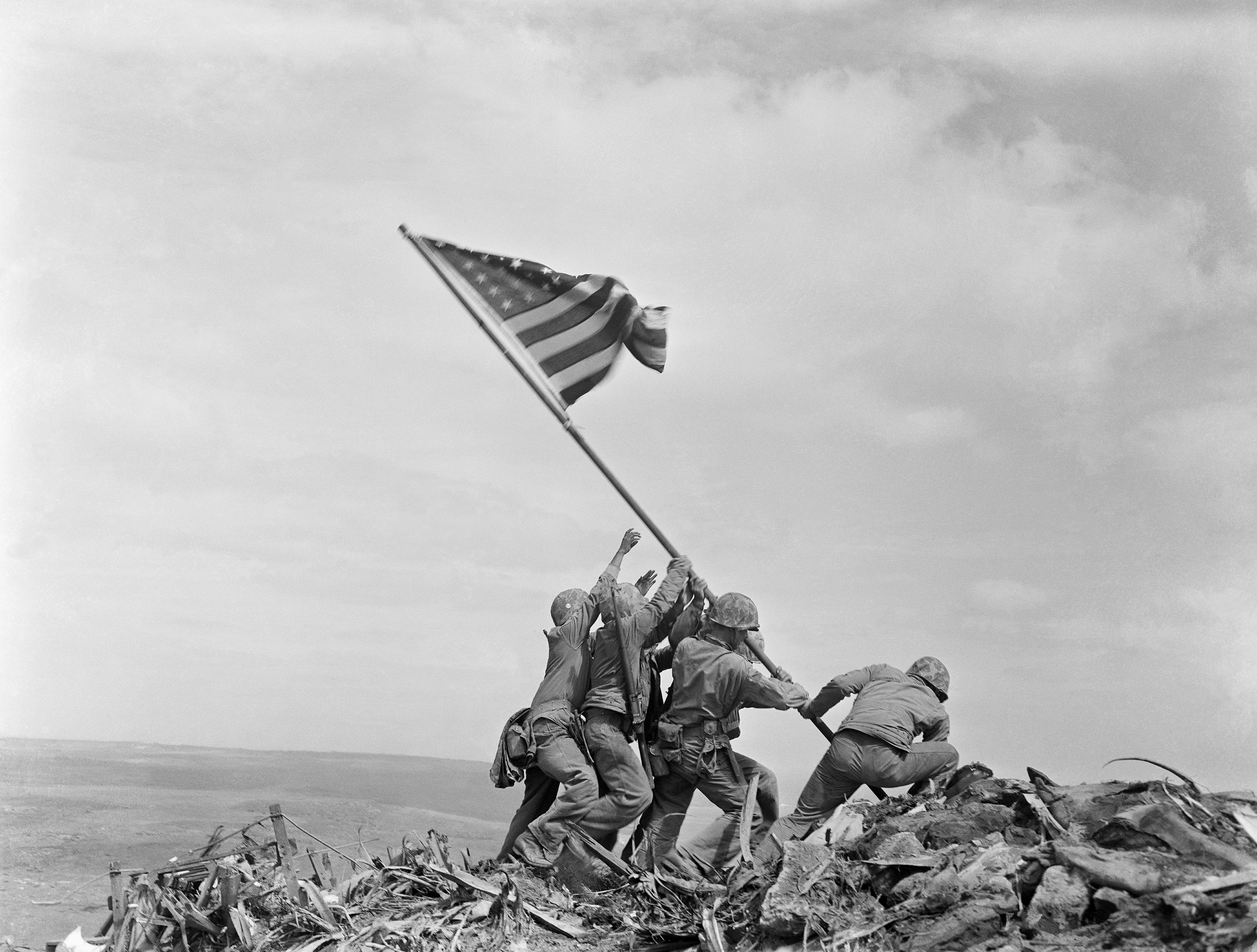
Raising the Flag on Iwo Jima, by Joe Rosenthal of the Associated Press

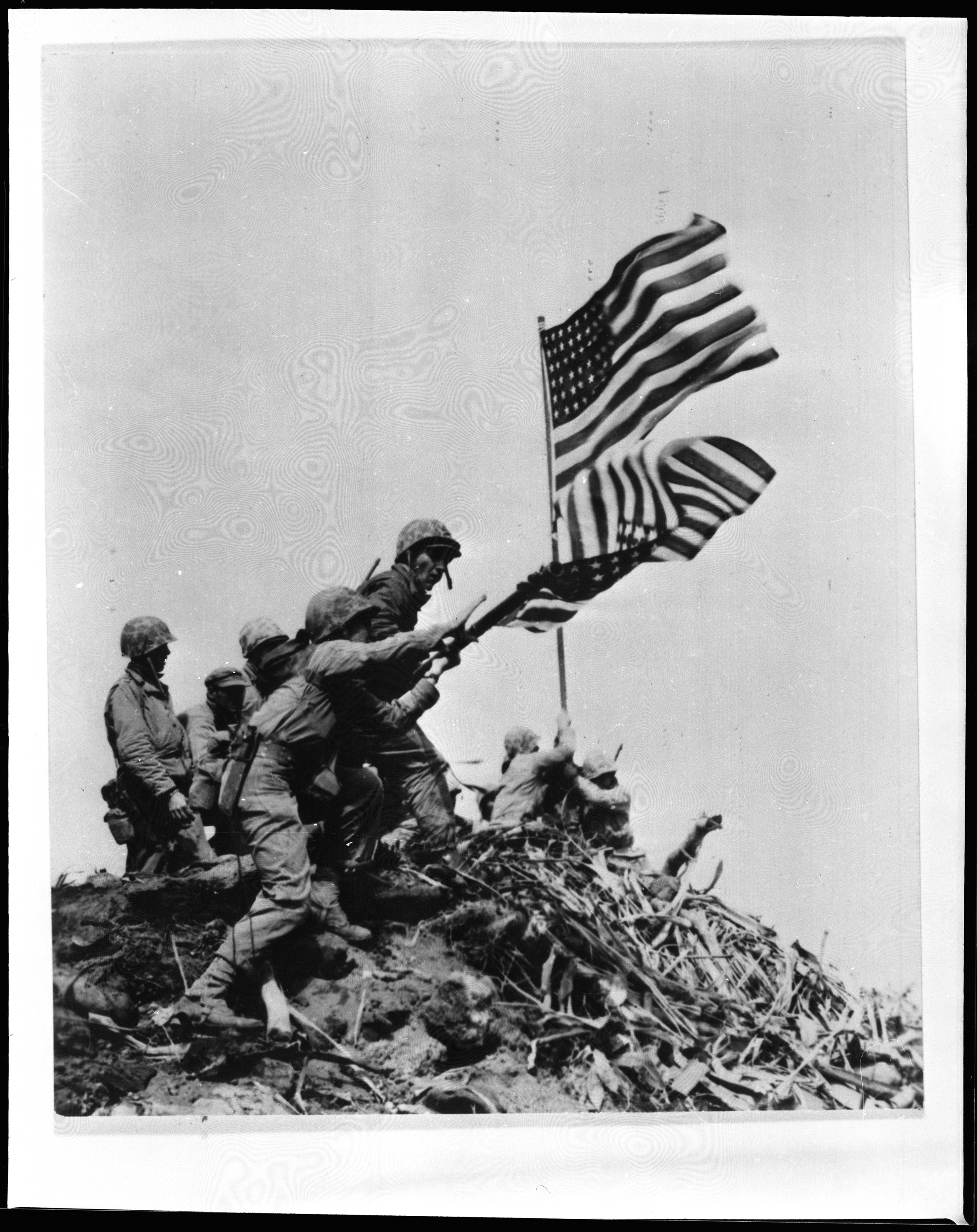
Marine Corps photo of the two flags on Mount Suribachi

When Lieutenant Colonel Johnson received word of Forrestal's wish, he angrily remarked "The hell with that!" Johnson wanted to retrieve the flag as soon as possible since he believed the flag belonged to his battalion. Johnson then sent his assistant operations officer, Second Lieutenant Ted Tuttle, down to the beach to secure a larger flag to raise over Suribachi.

Johnson then ordered Severance to have his Marines lay a telephone wire up to the top of Suribachi. Severance sent Sergeant Michael Strank, Corporal Harlon Block, and Privates First Class Ira Hayes, Franklin Sousley, and Rene Gagnon to the battalion command post to tie in the telephone wire and obtain radio batteries for Schrier. As the five Marines arrived at the command post, Tuttle also returned to Johnson with a 96 by 56 inch flag which he had acquired from USS LST-779. Johnson handed the flag to Gagnon and then told Strank to raise the second flag and have Schrier "save the small flag for me."

Strank then led the small group up Suribachi; where Strank, Block, Hayes, Sousley, and Private First Classes Harold Schultz and Harold Keller raised the second flag. The second flag raising was captured in the famous photograph taken by Joe Rosenthal. The first flag was brought back down Suribachi and returned to Lieutenant Colonel Johnson, who promptly placed it in the battalion safe.

==== Death ====
Lieutenant Colonel Johnson continued to lead 2/28 in the battle after the flag raising, advancing to the northeast end of the island. By March 2, the battalion was fighting over rugged terrain north of Hill 362A, in which the Japanese had constructed well-fortified positions. The lead companies sustained heavy casualties and were pinned down, and Johnson moved to the front line in order to reorganize his battalion to continue the assault. As Johnson was moving from one company to another, he was killed instantly by an exploding mortar round.

Chandler W. Johnson was posthumously awarded the Navy Cross for his actions during the battle. His remains were interred in the National Memorial Cemetery of the Pacific in Honolulu, Hawaii.

== Portrayal in film ==
Johnson is featured in the 2006 movie Flags of Our Fathers. In the movie, Johnson is played by American actor Robert Patrick. The movie is based on the 2000 book of the same title.

== See also ==
- Raising the Flag on Iwo Jima
- Battle of Iwo Jima
