= Marine Barracks =

Marine Barracks may refer to:

- Marine Barracks Brooklyn, New York at the Brooklyn Navy Yard
- Marine Barracks Boston, Massachusetts at the Boston Navy Yard
- Marine Barracks (Philadelphia, Pennsylvania), National Register of Historic Places listings in Philadelphia County, Pennsylvania
- Marine Barracks Mare Island, California at the Mare Island Naval Shipyard
- Marine Barracks, Naval Air Station Midway on Midway Island
- Marine Barracks, Washington, D.C., listed on the National Register of Historic Places in Washington, D.C. as the U.S. Marine Corps Barracks and Commandant's House
- Marine Corps Base Quantico, originally called Marine Barracks

== See also ==
- 1983 Beirut barracks bombing, an attack on United States Marine Corps barracks buildings
- Barracks
- Marines
