= Marine Barracks (Philadelphia, Pennsylvania) =

- U.S. National Register of Historic Places
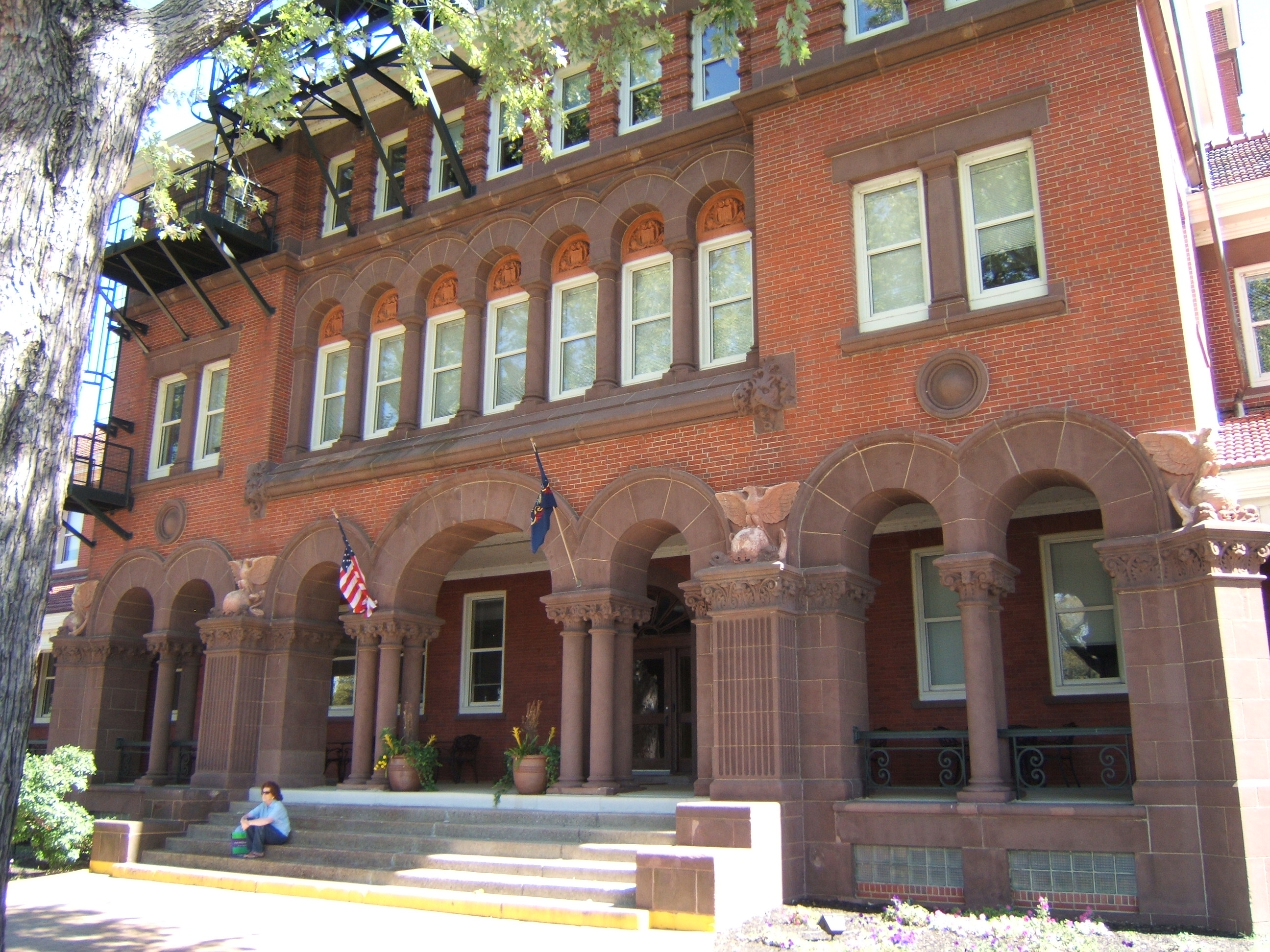
- Marine Barracks, September 2010

- Location within Philadelphia Location within Pennsylvania Location within the United States
- Location: Bldg. 100, Naval Base, Broad St., Philadelphia, Pennsylvania
- Coordinates: 39°53′31″N 75°10′29″W
- Area: less than one acre
- Built: 1901
- Built by: U.S. Navy
- NRHP reference No.: 76001664
- Added to NRHP: July 13, 1976

The Marine Barracks is an historic barracks that is located at the Philadelphia Naval Shipyard in Philadelphia, Pennsylvania, United States.

It was added to the National Register of Historic Places in 1976.

== History and architectural features ==
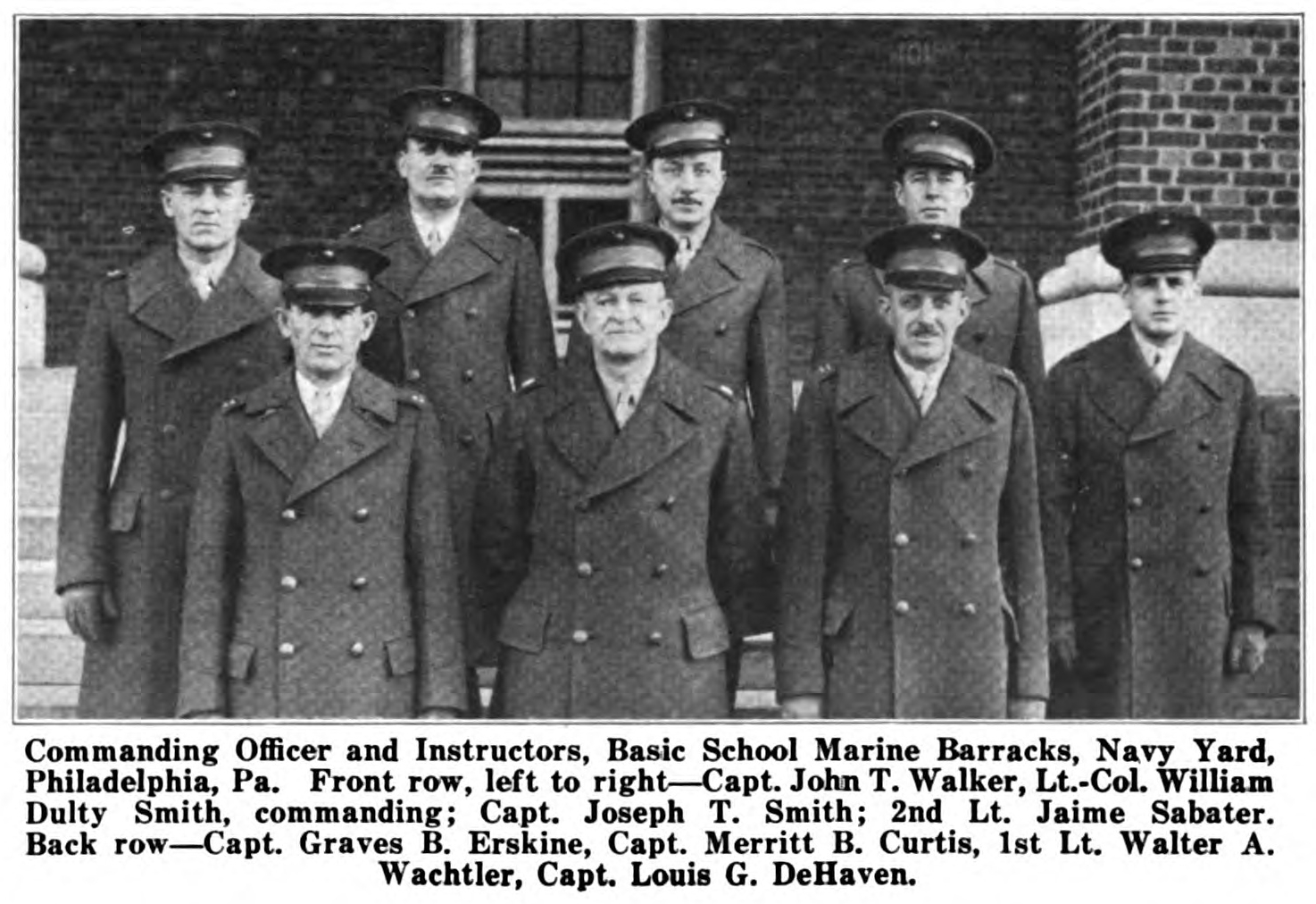
Leatherneck Magazine, May 1932

Built by the United States Marine Corps in 1901 and designed by Henry Ives Cobb, this historic structure is a four-story, red brick and gypsum block building. It features a central rounded archway, open porch, and tile roof. It remains occupied by the Marine Corps.

Some of the first Naval Aviators landed and took off from the parade grounds in the front of the building. The Marine Barracks was added to the National Register of Historic Places in 1976.

From 1974 to 1977, the Commanding Officer was Colonel S. G. Tribe, and the Executive Officer was Lt. Colonel R. C. Finn.

The barracks officially closed in September 1977.
