= 2nd Battalion, 28th Marines =

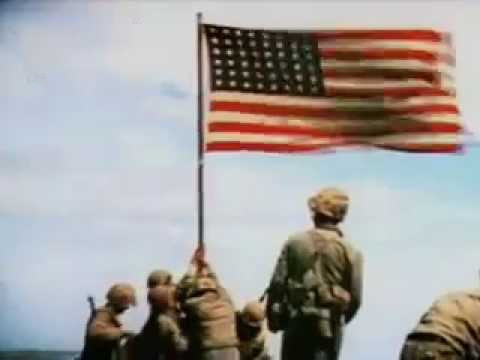
- Movie caption of members of the 2nd Battalion, 28th Marines planting the U.S. flag atop Mount Suribachi
- Active: February 1944 – January 1946; 1967–1969
- Country: United States of America
- Branch: United States Marine Corps
- Type: Infantry battalion
- Role: Locate, close with and destroy the enemy by fire and maneuver
- Size: 1,000
- Part of: Inactive
- Engagements: World War II: Battle of Iwo Jima

Commanders
- Notable commanders: Chandler W. Johnson

The 2nd Battalion, 28th Marine Regiment (2nd Battalion, 28th Marines) is an infantry battalion of the United States Marine Corps. The battalion (inactive since the Vietnam War) which is part of the 28th Marine Regiment, 5th Marine Division, fought in the Battle of Iwo Jima during World War II. Six Marines of E Company, 2nd Battalion, 28th Marines were featured in the historical photo by Joe Rosenthal of the U.S. flag raising on top of Mount Suribachi.

== Subordinate units ==
World War II

- Headquarters Company
- Dog Company
- Easy Company
- Foxtrot Company
- Weapons Company

Vietnam War

- Headquarters Company
- Delta Company
- Echo Company
- Fox Company
- Weapons Company

== History ==
=== World War II ===
==== Early days ====
The 2nd Battalion, 28th Marine Regiment was activated at Marine Corps Base Camp Pendleton in February 1944 as part of the 5th Marine Division. Many of the battalion's personnel came from the recently inactivated 3rd and 4th Parachute Battalions. In September of that year, the division sent to Hawaii to begin training for combat in the Pacific theater.

==== Battle of Iwo Jima ====
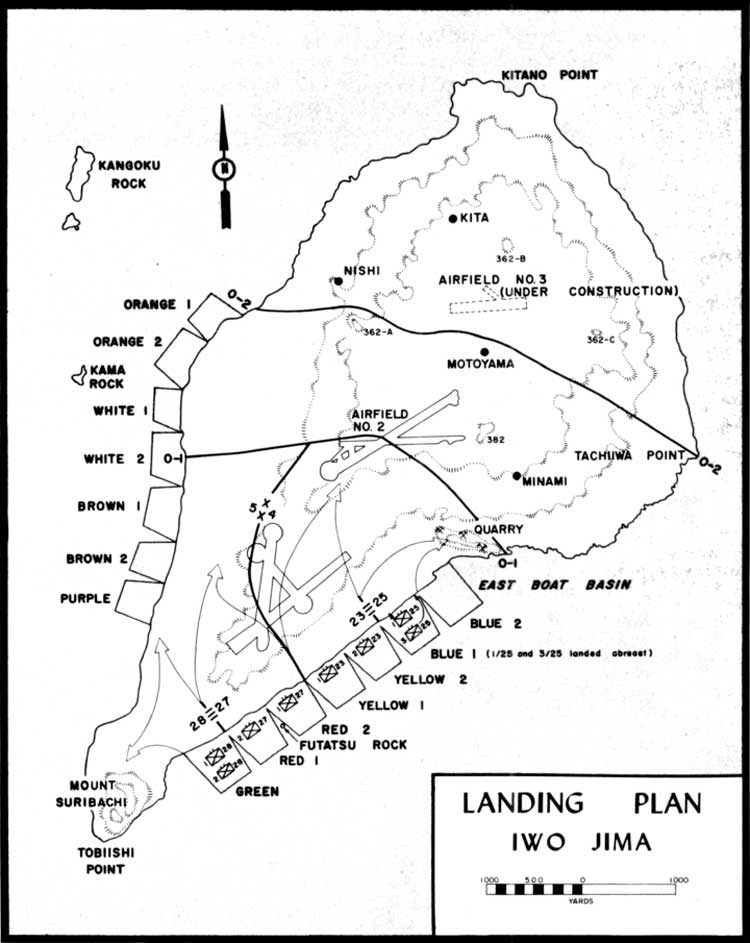
Iwo Jima landing plan showing where 2/28 came ashore.

The Second Battalion, 28th Marines (2/28 Marines) departed Hawaii in January 1945 and a month later were part of the initial invasion force in the Battle of Iwo Jima. The 2nd Battalion, 28th Marines landed at Beach Green 1 just northeast of the imposing Mount Suribachi. Their mission was part of the larger one for the 28th Marine Regiment (28th Marines), which was to assault across the island cutting it in two and then assault and capture Mount Suribachi. On D-Day+1, in a cold rain, the 2nd Battalion, 28th Marines prepared to assault the mountain. The Second Battalion's commanding officer, Lieutenant Colonel Chandler W. Johnson, set the tone for the morning as he deployed his tired troops forward: "It's going to be a hell of a day in a hell of a place to fight the damned war!"

Early on the morning of February 23, 1945, four days after the initial landings, Lieutenant Colonel Johnson ordered the E Company, 2nd Battalion, 28th Marines commander to send a patrol from his company up Mount Suribachi to seize and occupy the summit. First Lieutenant Harold G. Schrier, E Company's executive officer, volunteered to take a 40-man patrol up Suribachi and raise the battalion's American flag on the top if he could to signal the mountaintop was captured. Staff Sergeant Louis R. Lowery, a Leatherneck Magazine photographer, accompanied the patrol. After a short fire fight on top, the 54"-by-28" flag was attached to a long section of a Japanese water pipe they found and raised by Schrier, his platoon sergeant, and another sergeant. Seeing the flag up caused loud cheering from the men below on the beaches and ships. Lowery took several photos of the patrol before and after the flag was raised (none are shown of the actual raising and planting of the flag) which were not published until 1947.

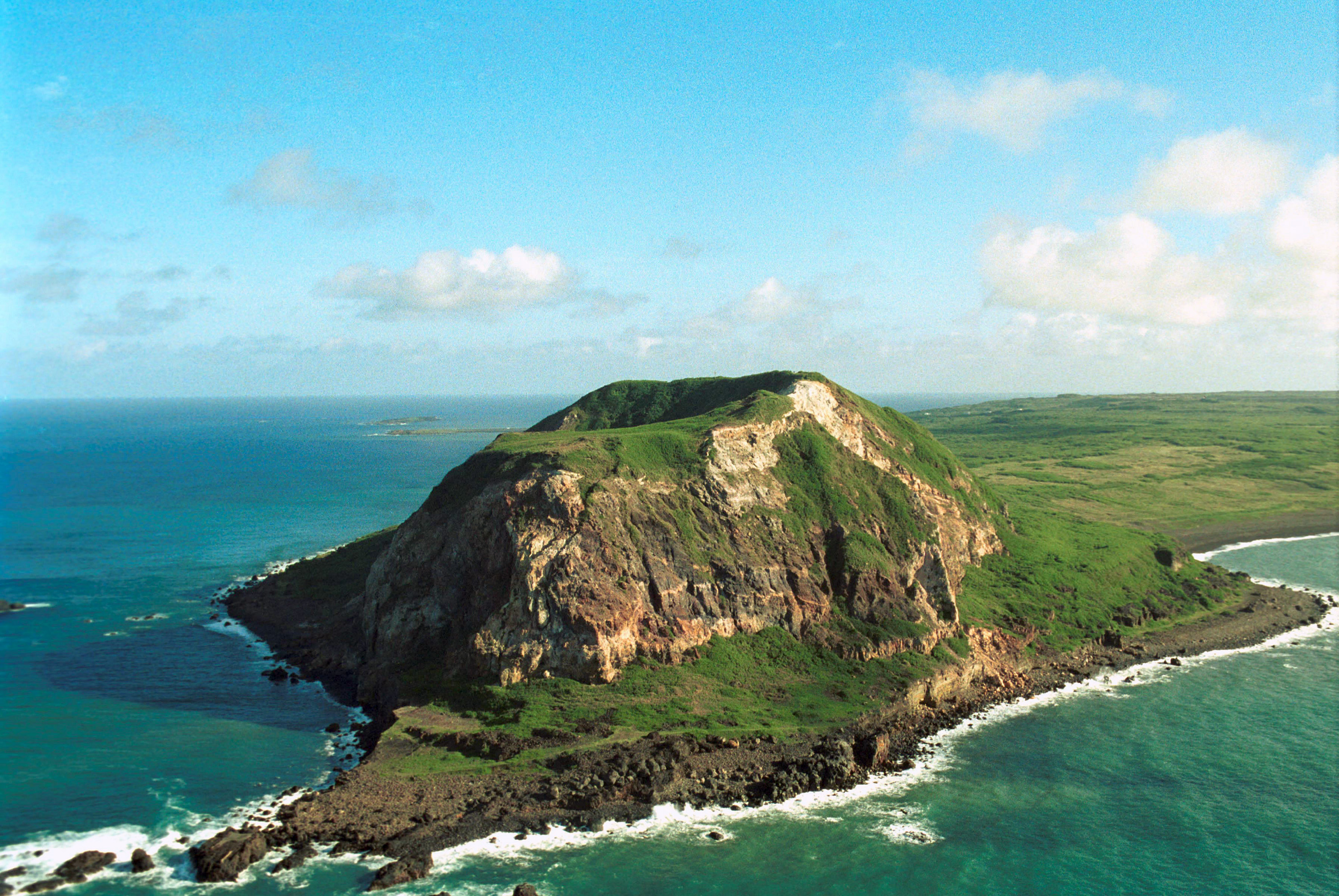
Mount Suribachi on Iwo Jima

The Marines determined about two hours later that the flag flying on Suribachi was too small to be easily seen north of Mount Suribachi where there was fighting going on with more fighting to occur in the days ahead. Lieutenant Colonel Johnson sent a Marine officer from the battalion to get a large flag (he went on board LST 779 for a flag) and also ordered the battalion adjutant to get a flag. The adjutant sent one of his E Company runners to get a flag who returned with one from a ship docked at shore. A squad leader from E Company was ordered to take three of his men up Mount Suribachi to raise the replacement flag which the runner took up ahead of them with orders for Lieutenant Schrier to have it raised and the first flag sent down with him (runner). Joe Rosenthal, an Associated Press photographer who had just come ashore, headed towards Mount Suribachi and ascended the mountain with two Marine photographers at this time. It is the photo of the second flag raising by Rosenthal that became the iconic photo of the battle.

Following the taking of Mount Suribachi, the 2nd Battalion, 28th Marines were allowed a few days' rest and then returned to fighting on the northern side of Mount Suribachi and the island on March 1 until Iwo Jima was declared secure on March 26, 1945 (the 5th Division left for Hawaii on March 27).

By the end of the campaign, 2/28 had suffered heavy casualties, especially among junior officers. In the line companies (D, E, and F), only five of twenty-one officers were neither killed nor wounded. This statistic excludes the replacement officers. The battalion commander, LtCol Chandler Johnson, was killed in action on 2 March 1945.

==== Post Iwo Jima ====
After the fighting on Iwo Jima, the battalion returned to Camp Tarawa, Hawaii to rest and refit and begin training for the planned invasion of Japan. The Japanese surrender saw the battalion take part in occupation duty near the city of Nagasaki. 2/28 returned to the United States in December 1945 and were inactivated shortly thereafter, in January 1946.

=== Reactivation ===
The battalion was reactivated in 1967 to serve as a training unit for Marines going to and returning from Vietnam. It was inactivated again in 1969.

== Unit awards ==
- Presidential Unit Citation, 19-28 February 1945, Iwo Jima

== Medal of Honor recipients ==
- George Phillips
- Donald J. Ruhl

== See also ==
- History of the United States Marine Corps
- List of United States Marine Corps battalions
