= Camp Tarawa =

Defunct military camp on Hawaiʻi Island

- Hawaiʻi Island, Hawaiʻi
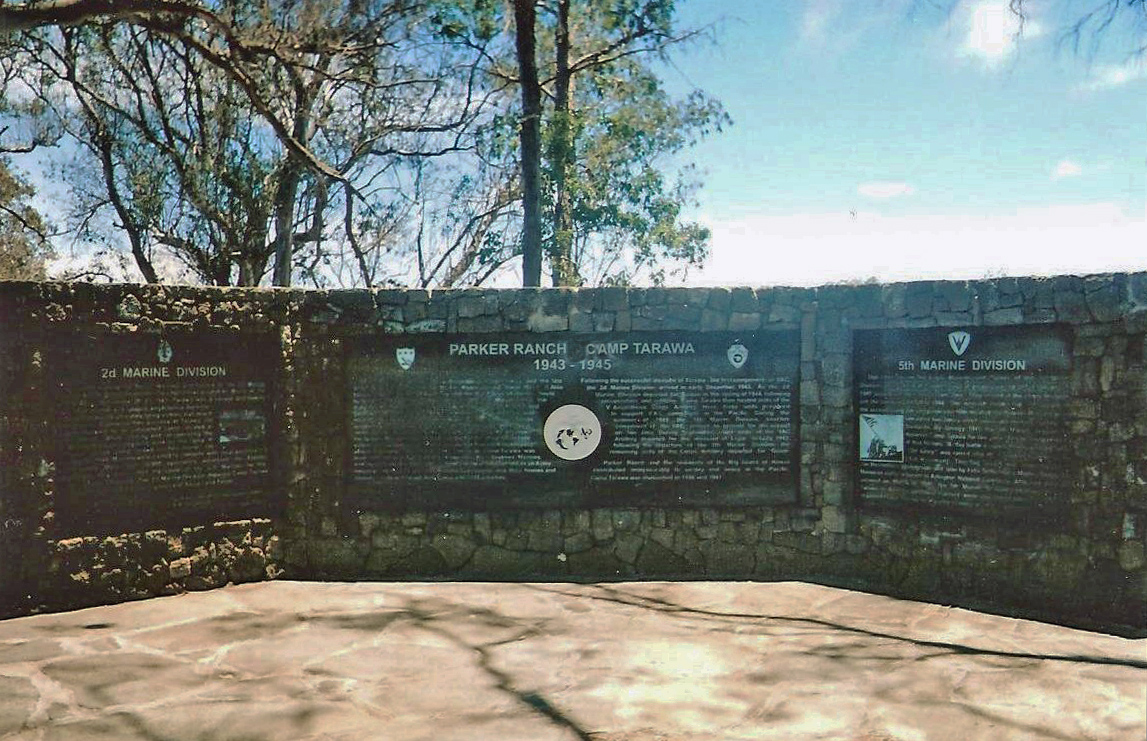
- The memorial plaque where Camp Tarawa once stood.

Site information
- Type: Training facility
- Owner: Parker Ranch
- Controlled by: United States
- Open to the public: No

Location
- Coordinates: 20°0′51″N 155°40′30″W

Site history
- In use: No
- Demolished: Yes

Garrison information
- Occupants: 2nd Marine Division

Camp Tarawa was a training camp located on Hawaiʻi Island constructed and used by the 2nd Marine Division during World War II. The grounds of the camp were situated between the volcanic peak of Mauna Kea and Kohala mountain. Marines were sent straight from the bloody Battle of Tarawa to the campsite, which they had to build themselves. It was well known for its harsh and dusty conditions by Marines who trained there. After the 2d Marine Division left for Saipan, the 5th Marine Division moved into the base and trained for the Battle of Iwo Jima. The base was closed for good in November 1945.

The base was chosen by Marine commanders because the colder climate was beneficial to Marines still suffering with malaria symptoms from the Guadalcanal Campaign, the nearby Parker Ranges were excellent training areas, the leadership knew that the Marines' next fight would be in mountainous terrain and the relative isolation of the camp gave the Marines time to adjust to the people of Hawaii after their brutal fight at Tarawa. A small memorial can be viewed by the side of the Māmalahoa Highway. It was located on the grounds of Parker Ranch, just outside the town of Waimea.

In the 1950s a new training center was located further inland and became the Pohakuloa Training Area.

== See also ==
- List of United States Marine Corps installations
- Camp Tarawa Detachment, Marine Corps League website
