= Charles Lindbergh (disambiguation) =

Charles Lindbergh (1902–1974) was an American aviator.

Charles Lindbergh may also refer to:

- Charles August Lindbergh (1859–1924), U.S. Representative from Minnesota and father of the aviator
- Charles Augustus Lindbergh, Junior (1930-1932), son of the aviator and subject of the famous Lindbergh kidnapping

== See also ==
- Charles W. Lindberg (1920–2007), veteran of, and flag raiser at, the Battle of Iwo Jima
- San Diego International Airport, also known locally as Lindbergh Field
