= Ernest Thomas =

Ernest Thomas may refer to:

- Ernest Lee Thomas (born 1949), American actor
- Ernest Thomas (Groveland Four) of the "Groveland Four" who were accused of rape in 1949
- Ernest Ivy Thomas Jr. (1924–1945), U.S. Marine, recipient of the Navy Cross
