= Louis R. Lowery =

American Marine and photographer (1916–1987)

- Born: July 24, 1916
- Died: April 15, 1987 (aged 70)
- Burial place: Quantico National Cemetery
- Military career
- Allegiance: United States
- Branch: United States Marine Corps
- Rank: Captain
- Nickname: Lou
- Conflicts: Battle of Saipan, Tinian, Guam, Peleliu, Iwo Jima, and Okinawa
- Awards: Purple Heart Medal (2); Combat Action Ribbon
- Other work: Leatherneck Magazine; United States Marine Corps Combat Correspondents Association

Louis R. Lowery (July 24, 1916 – April 15, 1987) was a United States Marine Corps captain. He was the only Marine Corps combat photographer to cover six major campaigns during World War II. He is best known for taking the first photographs of the first American flag that was raised on top of Mount Suribachi during the Battle of Iwo Jima on the morning of February 23, 1945.

Lowery was the founder and president of the United States Marine Corps Combat Correspondents Association (USMCCCA). He also was a photographic director of Leatherneck Magazine, a publication of the Marine Corps. He died on April 15, 1987, at age 70 from aplastic anemia and is buried in Quantico National Cemetery in Prince William County, Virginia near the Marine Corps War Memorial. In 2006, Lowery was portrayed by actor David Hornsby in film Flags of Our Fathers.

== Biography ==
Lowery was born in Pittsburgh, Pennsylvania, on July 24, 1916. He attended Boyd Business College and the National School of Photography in Pennsylvania. He was a newspaper photographer in Pittsburgh before World War II. In 1967, he served as president of the Marine Corps Combat Correspondents Association. He received the Brigadier General Robert L. Denig Memorial Award in 1983 for distinguished service.

== U.S. Marine Corps ==
Lowery covered fighting on Peleliu, Saipan, Tinian, Guam, Iwo Jima, and Okinawa during World War II. He was awarded two Purple Hearts. He remained in the Marine Corps Reserve after the war and attained the rank of captain.

=== Battle of Iwo Jima ===
==== U.S. Flag raisings ====
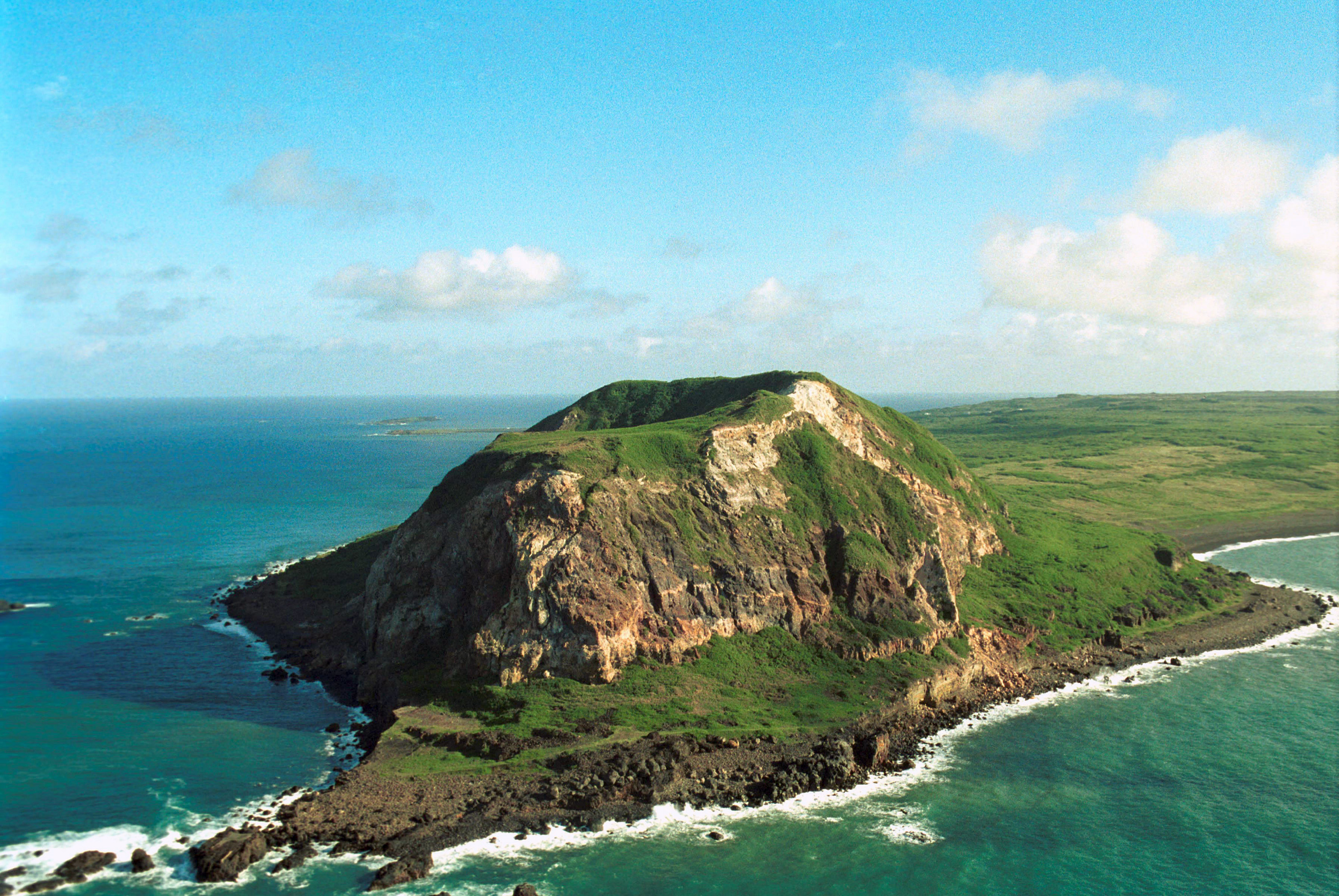
Mount Suribachi on Iwo Jima

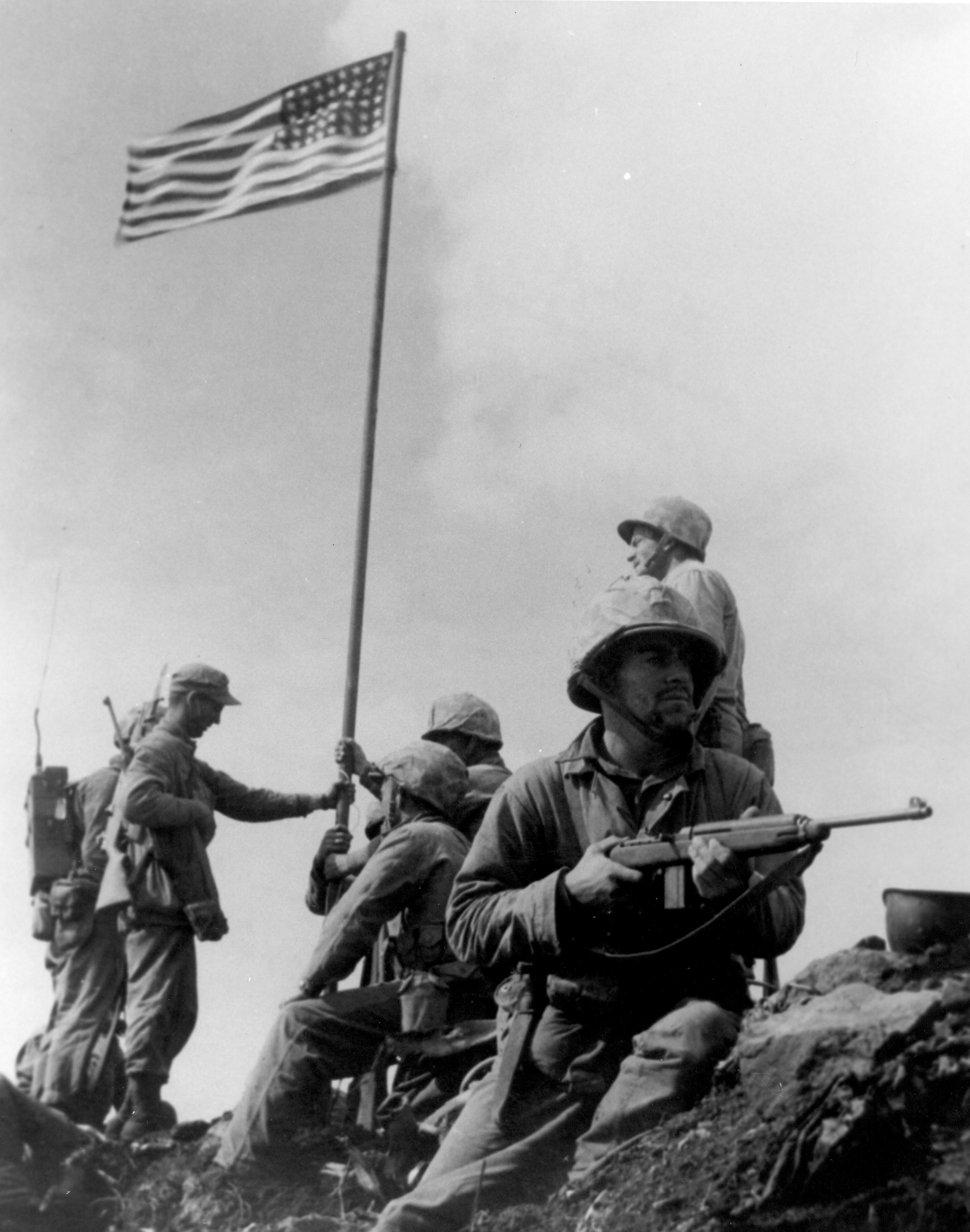
Staff Sergeant Lou Lowery's most widely circulated image of the first American flag flown on Mount Suribachi. Left to right: 1st Lt. Harold Schrier (kneeling beside radioman's legs), Pfc. Raymond Jacobs (radio operator), Sgt. Henry "Hank" Hansen (soft cap, holding flagstaff), Platoon Sgt. Ernest "Boots" Thomas (seated), Pvt. Phil Ward (holding lower flagstaff), PhM2c. John Bradley, USN (holding flagstaff, standing above Ward and Thomas), Pfc. James Michels (holding M1 carbine), and Cpl. Charles Lindberg (standing above Michels).

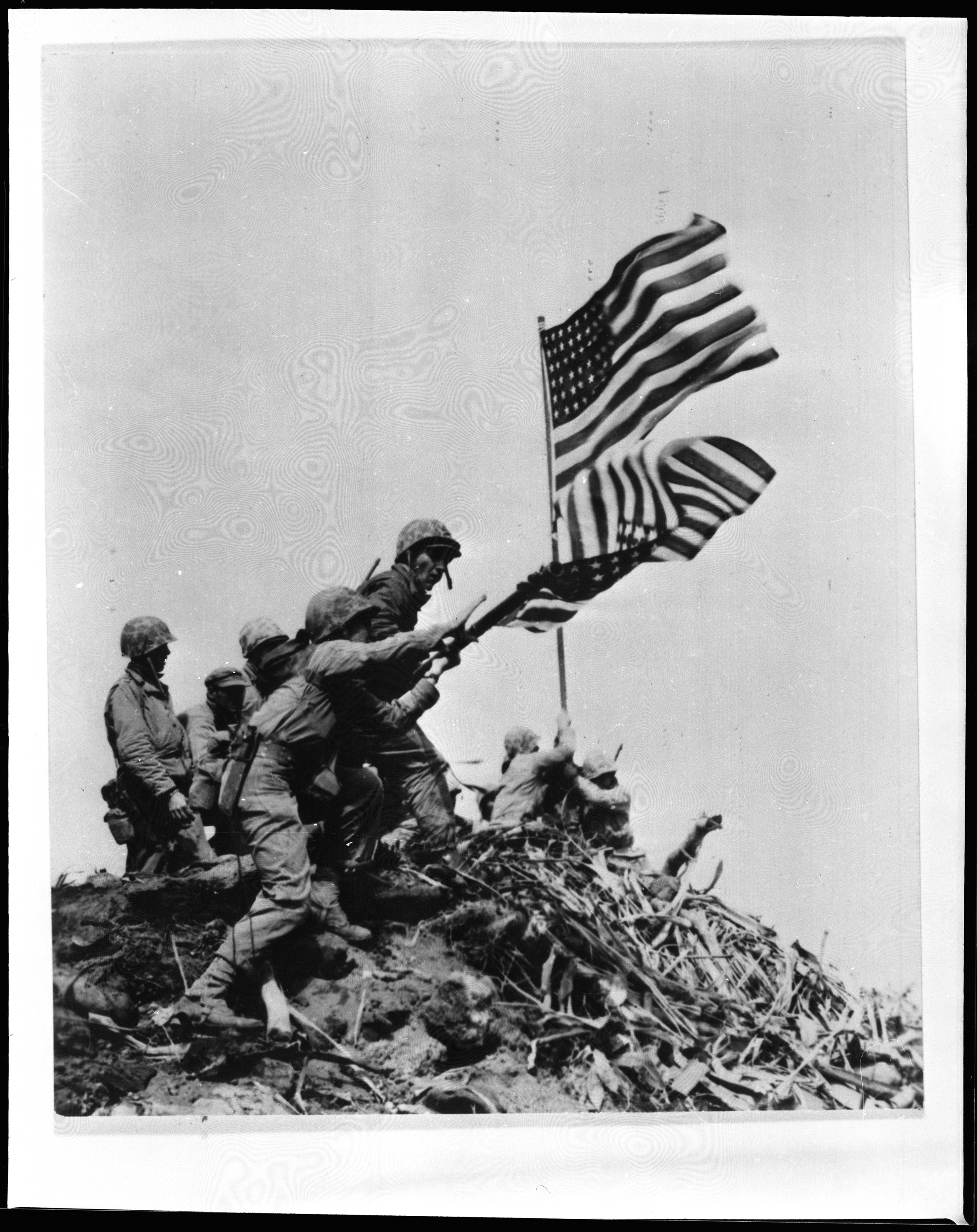
Private Robert R. Campbell's photograph taken when the larger second flag replaced the first raised at Iwo Jima

On February 23, 1945, Lowery, then a staff sergeant, accompanied the 40-man combat patrol (which included two Navy corpsmen) that climbed Mount Suribachi to seize and occupy the crest and raise the Second Battalion's U.S. flag if possible to signal that it was captured. The patrol led by First Lieutenant Harold Schrier, captured and secured the mountaintop and raised the flag attached to a Japanese steel water pipe approximately 10:30 A.M. Immediately after the flag was raised, a short firefight took place after Japanese soldiers came out of a cave. An enemy grenade was tossed, and Lowery fell with his camera several feet down the side of the crater from the blast. Lowery was unhurt, and though his camera was damaged, the film was intact.

The actual flag raising (not in Lowery's photographs) was done by Lt. Schrier (a former Marine Raider), Platoon Sgt. Ernest Thomas (a former drill instructor), and Sgt. Henry Hansen (a former Paramarine), according to Sgt. Thomas who did a CBS news interview aboard the flagship USS Eldorado (AGC-11) after meeting with Vice Admiral Richmond K. Turner and Lieutenant General Holland Smith on February 25, 1945. Most of the patrol members were from Third Platoon, Easy Company, 2nd Battalion, 28th Marine Regiment, 5th Marine Division; Pfc. Raymond Jacobs was the radioman (photographed by Lowery) reassigned from F Company for the patrol. Hansen was killed in action on Iwo Jima on March 1 and Thomas on March 3, 1945.

The flag was determined to be too small to be easily seen north of Mount Suribachi where most of the Japanese soldiers were located and heavy fighting would occur in the coming days. A second (and larger) American flag attached to another Japanese steel pipe, was raised and planted by a group of six different Marines approximately 1 P.M. the same day which resulted in the world-famous photograph taken by Joe Rosenthal of the Associated Press who was awarded the Pulitzer Prize for Photography later that year. At Schrier's command, one flag went up and the other flag came down. Rosenthal, whose photos were processed days before Lowery's photos were, went up Mount Suribachi with Marine photographers Sgt. Bill Genaust (killed in action on March 4) and Pvt. Robert R. Campbell after the first flag was raised. While Lowery was coming down Suribachi, he met Rosenthal and the two Marine photographers, and he informed them about the first flag raising.

On March 14, by orders of General Holland Smith, another U.S. flag was officially raised during a ceremony at V Amphibious Corps headquarters near the base of Mount Suribachi which signaled the island was occupied by U.S. Forces and the flag flying on Mount Suribachi was taken down; the battle of Iwo Jima was officially over on March 26.

== Lowery headstone ==
Lowery was buried at the Quantico National Cemetery in 1987, followed by his wife Doris in 2004.

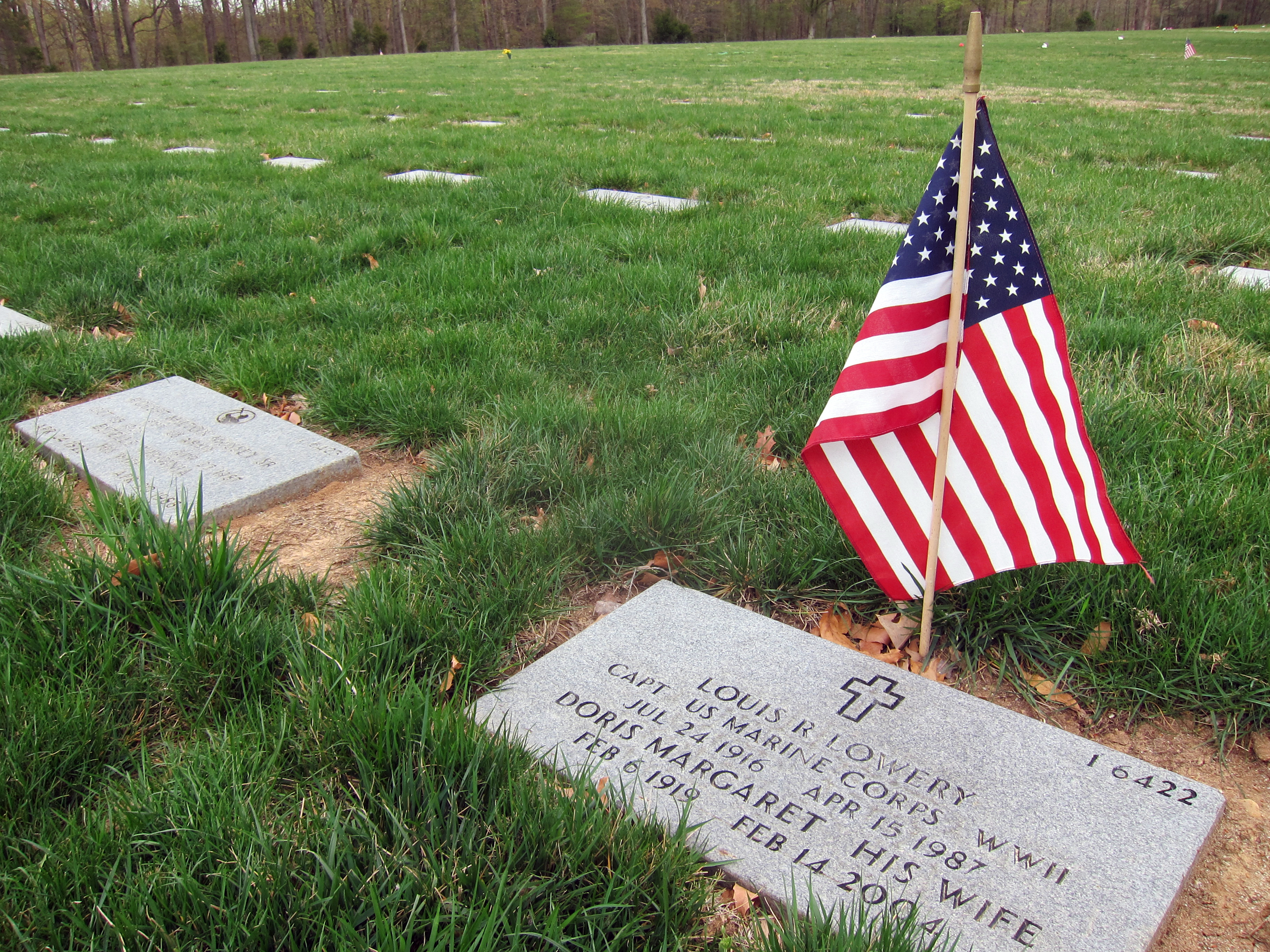
Lowery headstone in Quantico National Cemetery, in Virginia.

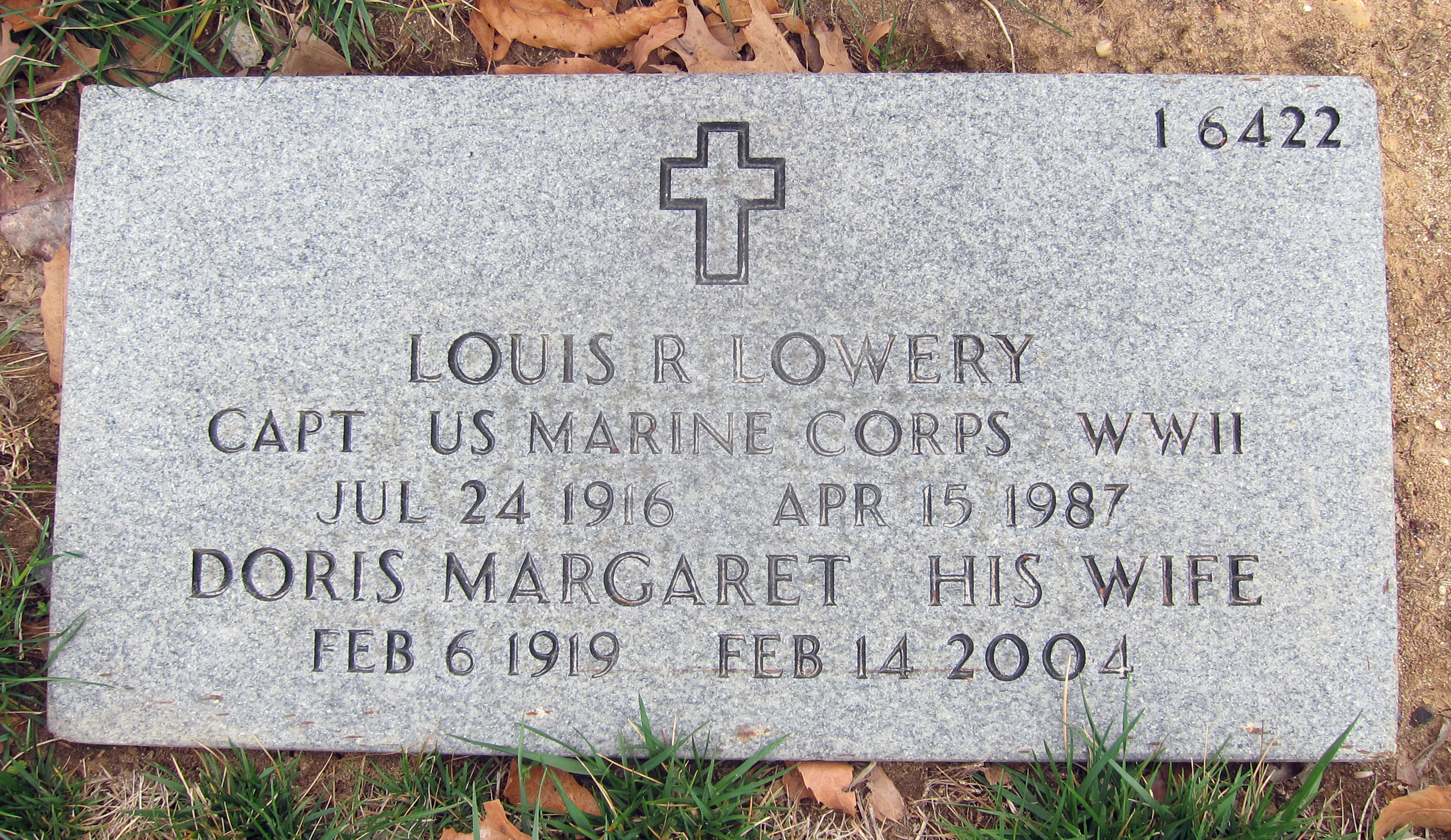
Lowery headstone: Plot: Section 1, Grave 6422.

== Louis R. Lowery Award ==
The "Louis R. Lowery Award", sponsored by Leatherneck magazine and the Marine Corps Association, is presented for photo of the year appearing in Leatherneck or as its cover.

== Military awards ==
Lowery's military decorations and awards include:

Purple Heart Medal w/ one 5/16" Gold Star
Combat Action Ribbon	Navy Presidential Unit Citation	American Campaign Medal
Asiatic-Pacific Campaign Medal w/ one 3/16" silver star and one 3/16" bronze star	World War II Victory Medal	National Defense Service Medal

== Marine Corps War Memorial ==
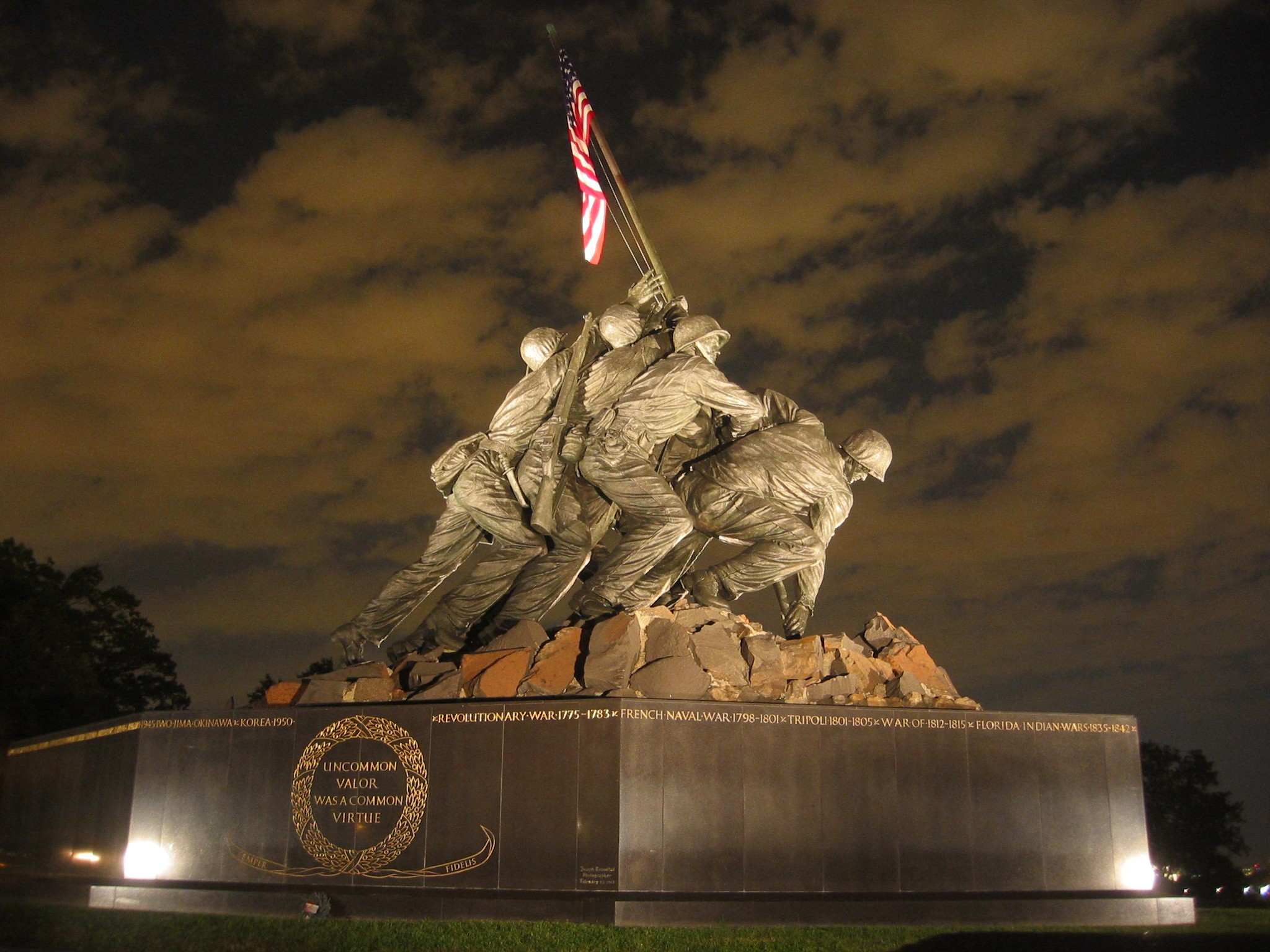
The U.S. Marine Corps War Memorial in Arlington, Virginia

The Marine Corps War Memorial (also known as the Iwo Jima Memorial) in Arlington, Virginia which was inspired by Rosenthal's photograph of the second flag-raising by six Marines atop Mount Suribachi on February 23, 1945, was dedicated on November 10, 1954. Lowery, who was present at the first flag-raising on Mount Suribachi and took the first photographs of the American flag, attended the dedication.

President Dwight D. Eisenhower sat upfront with Vice President Richard Nixon, Deputy Secretary of Defense Robert Anderson, and General Lemuel C. Shepherd, the 20th Commandant of the Marine Corps during the dedication ceremony. Two of the three surviving flag-raisers depicted on the monument, Ira Hayes and Rene Gagnon, were seated together with John Bradley (a Navy corpsman who was incorrectly identified as being a flag-raiser) in the front rows of seats along with relatives of those who were killed in action on the island. Speeches were given by Richard Nixon, Robert Anderson who dedicated the memorial, and General Shepherd who presented the memorial to the American people. Inscribed on the memorial are the following words:

In Honor And Memory Of The Men of The United States Marine Corps Who Have Given Their Lives To Their Country Since 10 November 1775

On June 23, 2016, the Marine Corps announced that former Navy corpsman John Bradley (deceased) who was depicted as the third bronze statue from the bottom of the flagstaff on the monument, was not in the Rosenthal photograph and former Marine Harold Schultz (deceased) was. Franklin Sousley and Schultz are depicted as the third and fifth bronze statues from the bottom of the flagstaff with the 32 foot (9.8 M) bronze statues of Harlon Block, Rene Gagnon, Michael Strank, and Ira Hayes on the monument.

== See also ==
- Battle of Iwo Jima
- War photographer
- Embedded journalism
- National Museum of the Marine Corps
