= Charles W. Lindberg =

United States Marine Corps corporal (1920-2007)

Charles Lindberg
- Born: June 26, 1920; Grand Forks, North Dakota, U.S.
- Died: June 24, 2007 (aged 86); Edina, Minnesota, U.S.
- Burial place: Fort Snelling National Cemetery, Minneapolis
- Military career
- Allegiance: United States of America
- Branch: United States Marine Corps
- Service years: 1942–1946
- Rank: Corporal
- Unit: 2nd Battalion 28th Marines
- Conflicts: World War II: Battle of Guadalcanal; Battle of Bougainville; Battle of Iwo Jima
- Awards: Silver Star Medal; Purple Heart Medal; Combat Action Ribbon

Charles "Chuck" Willard Lindberg (June 26, 1920 – June 24, 2007) was a United States Marine Corps corporal who fought in three island campaigns during World War II. During the Battle of Iwo Jima, he was a member of the patrol which captured the top of Mount Suribachi where he helped raise the first U.S. flag on the island on February 23, 1945. Six days later, he was wounded in action.

The first flag flown over the southern end of Iwo Jima was regarded to be too small to be seen by the thousands of Marines fighting on the other side of the mountain where the Japanese airfields and most of their troops were located, so it was replaced the same day with a larger flag. Although there were photographs taken of the first flag flying on Mount Suribachi and some which include Lindberg, there is no photograph of Marines raising the first flag. The second flag-raising was photographed by Associated Press combat photographer Joe Rosenthal and became famous after copies of his photograph appeared in the newspapers two days later. Lindberg spent decades trying to bring awareness of the first flag raising and his participation in it.

The Marine Corps War Memorial in Arlington, Virginia, is modeled after the historic photograph of six Marines raising the second flag on Iwo Jima.

== U.S. Marine Corps ==
=== World War II ===
Lindberg was born and lived in Grand Forks, North Dakota, when he enlisted in the Marine Corps shortly after the Japanese Navy attack on Pearl Harbor. After completing recruit training, he volunteered for the Marine Raiders, a special unit of the Marine Corps. Lindberg first saw combat on Guadalcanal while serving as a member of the 2nd Raider Battalion ("Carlson's Raiders"), and participated in the "Long Patrol". He also saw combat with the 2nd Raiders on Bougainville. In February 1944, the Marine Raider (and Paramarine) units were disbanded and he returned to the United States. He was reassigned to the newly activated 5th Marine Division at Camp Pendleton, California. After training at Camp Pendleton, the division was sent to and trained at Camp Tarawa on the Big Island of Hawaii before leaving for Iwo Jima.

==== Battle of Iwo Jima ====
Lindberg was assigned as a flamethrower operator in 3rd Platoon, E Company, 2nd Battalion, 28th Marine Regiment, 5th Marine Division. On February 19, 1945, he landed with the fifth assault wave on the southeast beach of Iwo Jima closest to Mount Suribachi, which was the objective of the 28th Marine Regiment. Because of heavy fighting, the base of Mount Suribachi was not reached and surrounded until February 22. On February 23, flamethrower operators Cpl. Lindberg and Pvt. Robert Goode of E Company were members of the 40-man combat patrol which climbed up Mount Suribachi to seize and occupy the crest then raise the Second Battalion's American flag. On March 1, Lindberg was shot in the right forearm by a Japanese sniper and was evacuated off the island. He received the Silver Star for gallantry in action on Iwo Jima from February 19 to March 1, 1945 (Pvt. Goode was also wounded on March 1 and awarded the Silver Star).

===== First flag raising =====
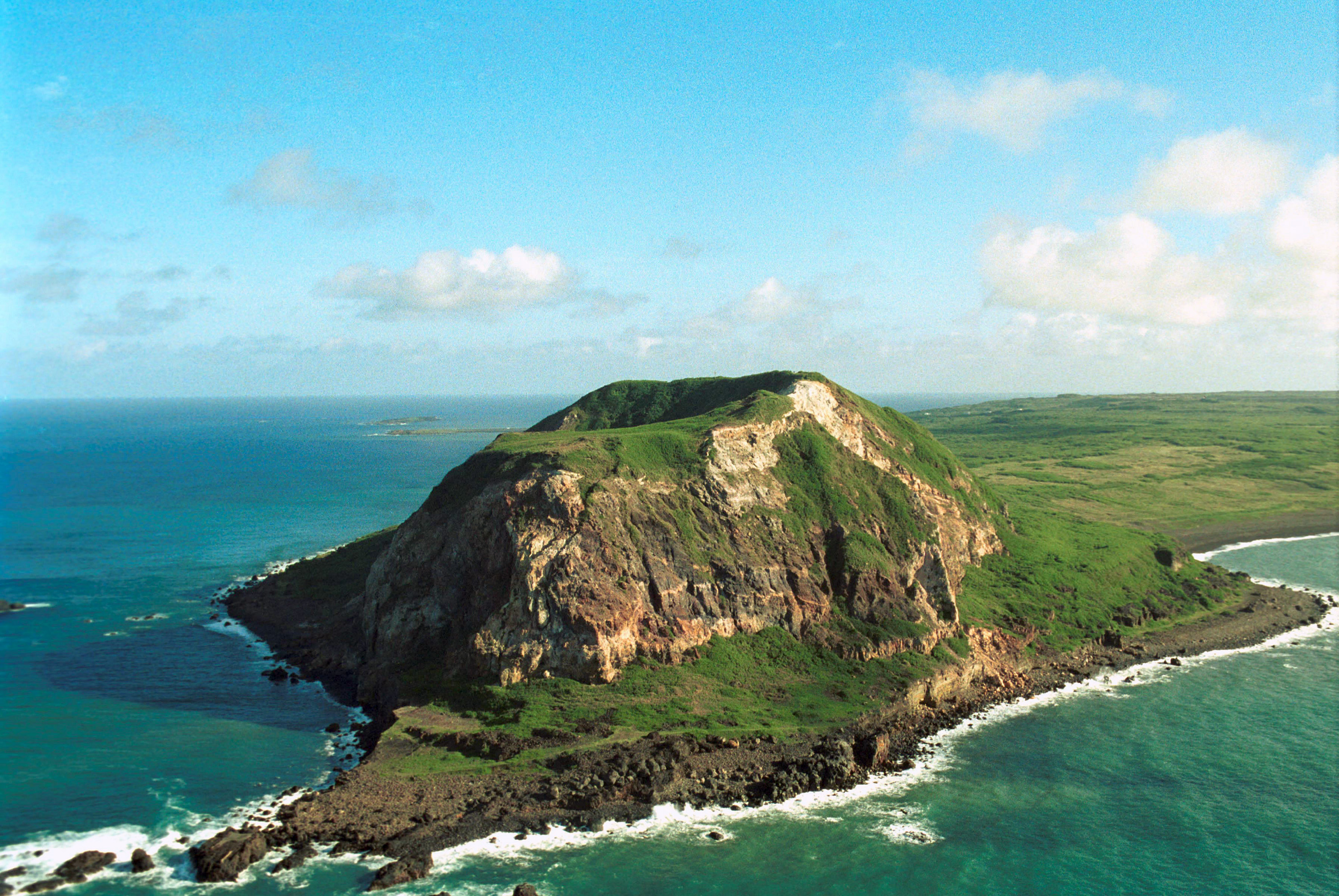
Mount Suribachi on Iwo Jima

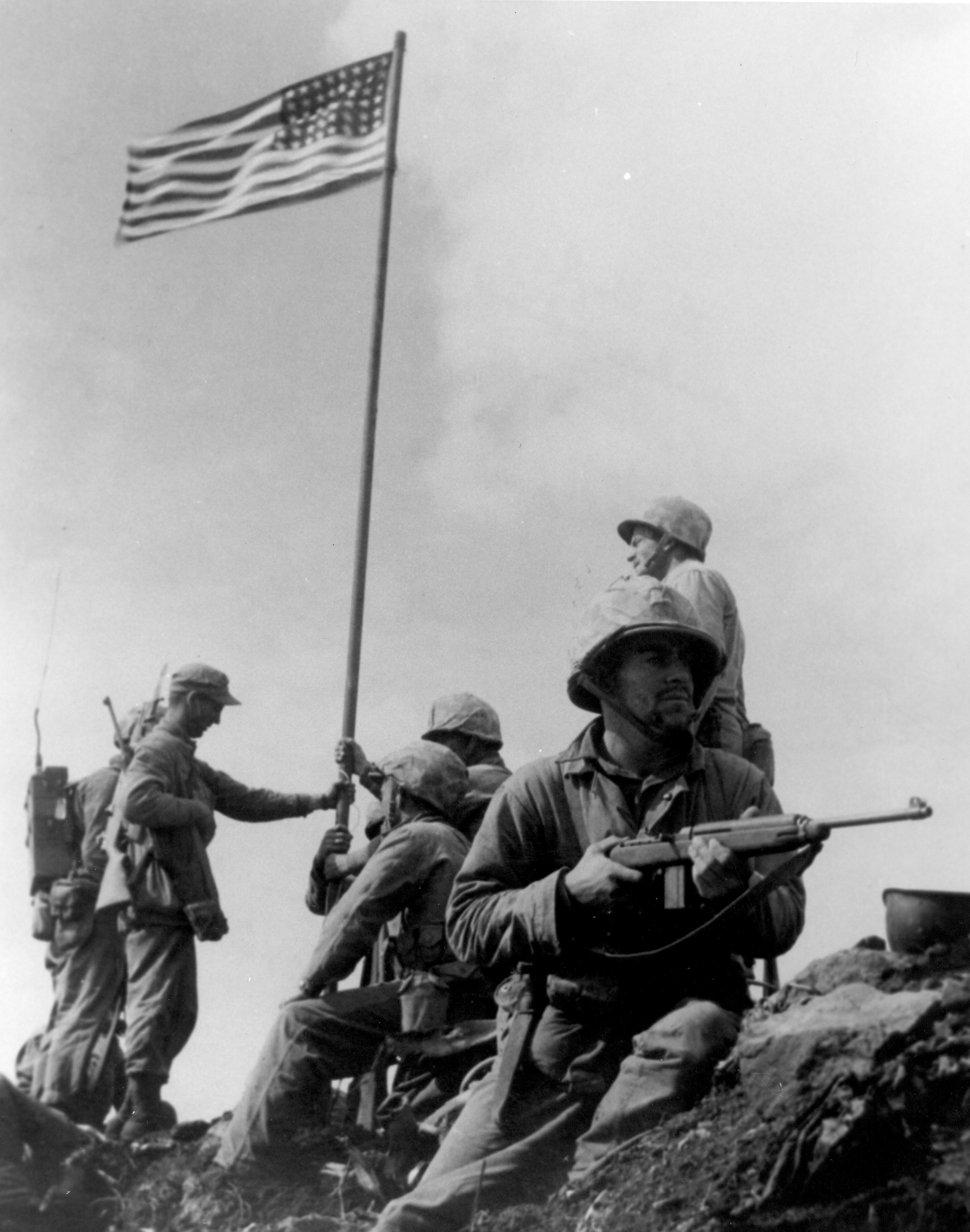
Marine Staff Sergeant Lou Lowery's photo of the first flag on Mount Suribachi, after it was raised. Left to right: 1st Lt. Harold G. Schrier (left side of radioman), Pfc. Raymond Jacobs (radio operator), Sgt. Henry " Hank" Hansen (soft cap, holding flagstaff), Pvt. Phil Ward (holding lower flagstaff), Platoon Sgt. Ernest "Boots" Thomas (seated), PhM2c. John Bradley, USN (holding flagstaff, standing above Ward and Thomas), Pfc. James Michels (holding M1 carbine), and Cpl. Charles Lindberg (standing, far right).

On February 23, 1945, Lieutenant Colonel Chandler W. Johnson, commander of the 2nd Battalion, 28th Marine Regiment, ordered a platoon-size patrol to climb up the 556-foot Mount Suribachi. First Lieutenant Harold Schrier, E Company's executive officer, was handed the Second Battalion's American flag from Lt. Colonel Johnson (or the battalion adjutant) measuring 28 by 54 inches (137 by 71 cm) which had been taken from the attack transport USS Missoula (APA-211) on the way to Iwo Jima by First Lieutenant George G. Wells the Second Battalion's adjutant in charge of the battalion's flags. Lt. Schrier was to take a patrol with the flag up the mountain and raise the flag if possible at the summit to signal that Mount Suribachi was captured and the top secure. Captain Dave Severance, E Company's commander, assembled the remainder of his Third Platoon and other members of the battalion including two Navy corpsmen and stretcher bearers. At 8:30 a.m., Lt. Schrier started climbing with the patrol up the mountain. Less than an hour later, the patrol, after receiving occasional Japanese sniper fire, reached the rim of the volcano. A brief firefight with the Japanese occurred, Lt. Schrier and his men captured the summit.

A section of a Japanese steel pipe was found on the mountain and the battalion's flag Lt. Schrier carried was tied to it by Lt. Schrier, Sgt. Henry Hansen and Cpl. Lindberg.

(Platoon Sergeant Ernest Thomas was watching inside the group with a grenade in his hand while Pvt. Phil Ward held the bottom end of the pipe horizontally off the ground). The flagstaff was then carried to the highest part on the crater and raised by Lt. Schrier, Platoon Sgt. Thomas, Sgt. Hansen, and Cpl. Lindberg at approximately 10:30 a.m. Seeing the national colors flying caused loud cheering from the Marines, sailors, and Coast Guardsmen on the beach below and from the men on the ships near and docked at the beach. Due to the strong winds on Mount Suribachi, Sgt. Hansen, Pvt. Ward, and Third Platoon corpsman John Bradley helped make the flagstaff stay in a vertical position. The men at, around, and holding the flagstaff which included Schrier's radioman Raymond Jacobs (assigned to patrol from F Company), were photographed several times by Staff Sgt. Louis R. Lowery, a photographer with Leatherneck magazine who accompanied the patrol up the mountain. A firefight with some Japanese soldiers took place, an enemy grenade caused Sgt. Lowery to fall down which damaged his camera but not his film. Platoon Sgt. Thomas was killed on March 3 and Sgt. Hansen was killed on March 1.

===== Second flag raising =====
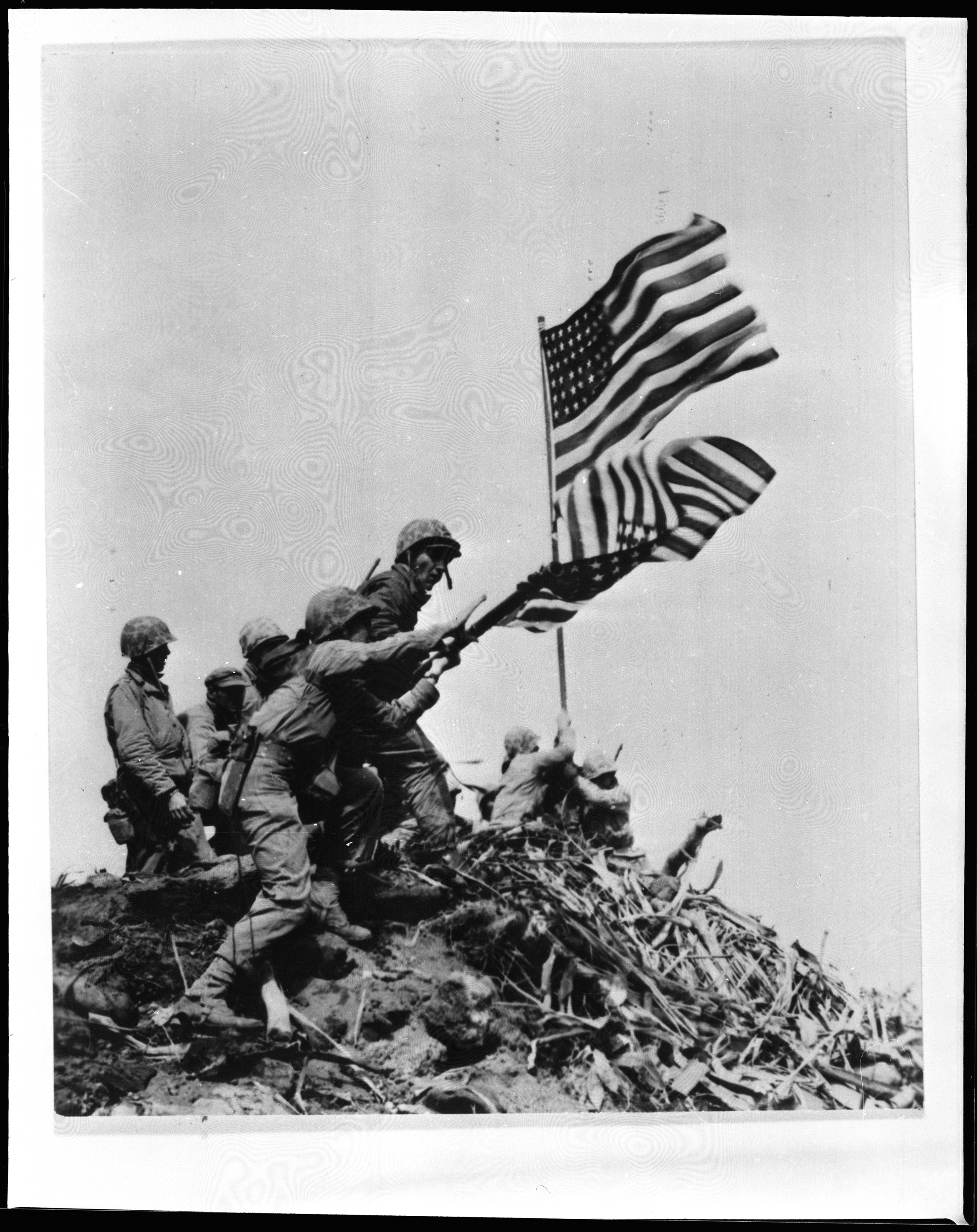
Marine Corps photo of the two flags on Mount Suribachi (second flag is raised as the first is lowered)

Lt. Colonel Johnson decided about two hours or more later on after the flag was raised, a larger flag should replace it. The flag was too small to be seen on the other side of the mountain where the Japanese airfields and most of the Japanese troops were located, and the thousands of Marines fighting there needed the inspiration of seeing the flag. While Lindberg was reloading his flamethrower tanks below Mount Suribachi, a 96 by 56 inch flag was obtained from a ship docked on shore and brought up to the top of Mount Suribachi by Pfc. Rene Gagnon the Second Battalion's runner (messenger) for E Company. At the same time, Sgt. Michael Strank, Cpl. Harlon Block, Pfc. Franklin Sousley, and Pfc. Ira Hayes from Second Platoon, E Company, were sent to take supplies up to Third Platoon and raise the second flag. Once on top, the flag was attached to another Japanese steel pipe and raised by the four Marines and Pfc. Harold Schultz and Pfc. Harold Keller, both of whom had gone up Suribachi with the 40-man patrol. At the same time the second flag was raised, the original flag was lowered and taken down the mountain to the battalion adjutant by Pfc. Gagnon. Sgt. Strank and Cpl. Block were killed on March 1. Pfc. Sousley was killed on March 21.

Joe Rosenthal's (Associated Press) historical flag-raising photograph of the second flag-raising on Mount Suribachi appeared in Sunday newspapers on February 25, 1945, as the flag-raising on Mount Suribachi. This flag raising was also filmed in color by Marine Sgt. Bill Genaust (who was killed in action in March) and was used in newsreels. Other combat photographers with and besides Rosenthal ascended the mountain after the first flag was raised and the mountaintop secured. These photographers including Rosenthal and an army photographer who was assigned to cover Marine amphibious landings for Yank Magazine, took photos of Marines, corpsmen, and themselves, around both of the flags. The second flag-raisers received tremendous national recognition. The three survivors (two were found out to be incorrectly identified) of the flag raising were called to Washington, D.C., after the battle by President Franklin D. Roosevelt to participate in a bond tour to raise much needed money to pay for the war. The Marines who captured Mount Suribachi and those who raised the first flag, including Lindberg, generally did not receive the national recognition due them even though the first flag raising was the first to receive some public recognition.

== Post-war and later life ==
Lindberg was honorably discharged from the Marine Corps in January 1946, and returned home to Grand Forks, North Dakota.

He married Violet Mae Tack (1926-2018) on October 9, 1947 in Grand Forks. They eventually had 5 children (two daughters and three sons), They moved to Richfield, Minnesota in 1951, where he worked as an electrician for 39 years. He attended the dedication ceremony of the Marine Corps War Memorial (also known as the Iwo Jima Memorial), which was inspired by Joe Rosenthal's photograph of the second flag-raising, in Arlington, Virginia on November 10, 1954. In the 1970s, he began telling his story about the capture of Mount Suribachi and the first American flag raising on top of which he had actually participated in, only to have his story called into question, until more of the facts of the first flag-raising became better known and accepted by the general public. He often spoke at schools, sharing some of his wartime memories of Iwo Jima and World War II with the children. In 1995, he returned to Iwo Jima for the 50th anniversary of the battle of Iwo Jima. In November 2006, he attended his last reunion of Third Platoon, E Company, 28th Marines, which was held in Washington, D.C.

== Death ==
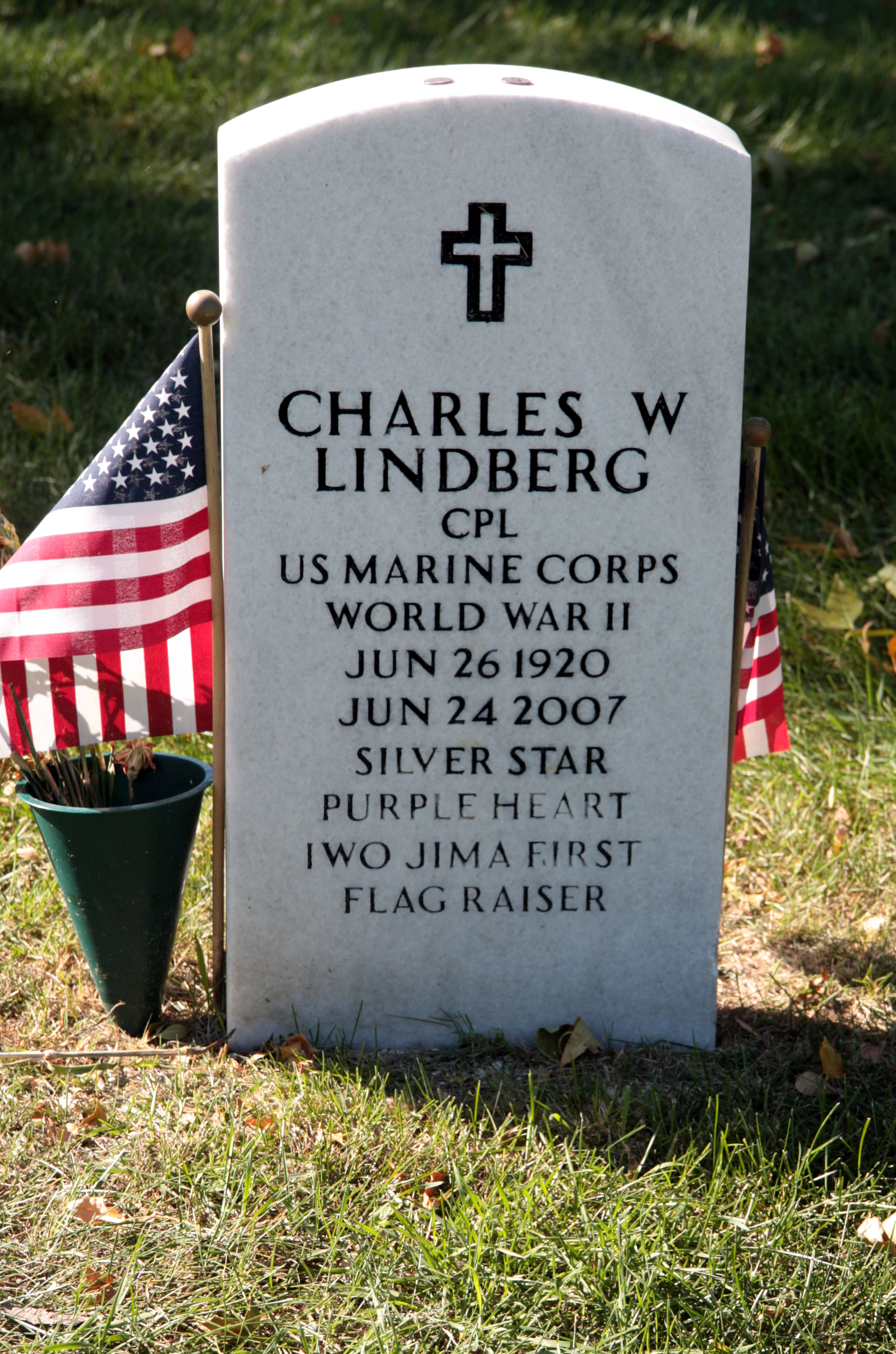
Charles W Lindberg headstone in Fort Snelling National Cemetery

Lindberg died at Fairview Southdale Hospital in Edina, Minnesota, on June 24, 2007. In a tribute to Lindberg, KARE TV ran the following report:

At Fort Snelling, Friday, June 29th, 2007 the nation bid farewell to a true World War II hero. Marine Chuck Lindberg was laid to rest at Fort Snelling National Cemetery.
The thundering jet fighters and some vintage WWII planes flew overhead to pay tribute. And it was well deserved.
Lindberg was the last survivor of the first flag-raising on Iwo Jima's Mount Suribachi. But his moment was overshadowed by a second flag-raising. He spent a lifetime correcting the record.
Still, on this Friday at Fort Snelling, there was no doubt about history's record.
During the ceremony one of Lindberg's daughters, Diane Steiger said, "The angels needn't worry tonight, another Marine has arrived. Our hero has gone home, the heavens are safer tonight."

Chuck Lindberg's bronze bust is the center piece of The Honoring All Veterans Memorial in Veterans Park in Richfield, Minnesota.

== Military awards ==
Lindberg's military decorations and awards include:

	Silver Star Medal	
Purple Heart Medal	Combat Action Ribbon	Navy Presidential Unit Citation with 3/16" bronze star
American Campaign Medal	Asiatic-Pacific Campaign Medal with three 3/16" bronze stars	World War II Victory Medal

=== Silver Star Medal citation ===
Lindberg's Silver Star Medal citation reads:

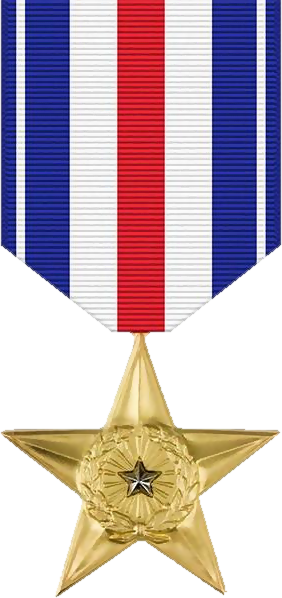

Citation:

For conspicuous gallantry and intrepidity while serving as Flame Thrower Operator of Company E, Second Battalion, Twenty-eight Marines, Fifth Marine Division, in action against enemy Japanese forces on Iwo Jima, Volcano Islands, from 19 February to 1 March 1945. Repeatedly exposing himself to hostile grenades and machine-gun fire in order that he might reach and neutralize enemy pill-boxes at the base of Mount Suribachi, Corporal Lindberg courageously approached within ten or fifteen yards of the emplacements before discharging his weapon, thereby assuring annihilation of the enemy and the successful completion of his platoon's mission. As a member of the first combat patrol to scale Mount Suribachi, he courageously carried his flame thrower to the steep slopes and assisted in destroying the occupants of the many caves found in the rim of the volcano, some of which contained as many as seventy Japanese. While engaged in an attack on hostile cave positions on March 1, he fearlessly exposed himself to accurate enemy fire and was subsequently wounded and evacuated. By his determinations in manning his weapon, despite its weight and the extreme heat developed in operation, Corporal Lindberg greatly assisted in securing his company's position. His courage and devotion to duty were in keeping with the highest traditions of the United States Naval Service.

== Portrayal in films ==
In the film Flags of Our Fathers (2006), Lindberg is played by Alessandro Mastrobuono. Lindberg is the only character to appear in both Flags of Our Fathers and its companion film, Letters from Iwo Jima, although in the latter, he is uncredited and simply seen in the same shot of both films, rushing towards a bunker with a flamethrower.

== Public honors ==
- The Freedom Defenders Veterans Memorial (Lindberg statue and plaque, 2006) in Bemidji, Minnesota.
- The Charles "Chuck" W. Lindberg Electrical Training Center (2007) in St. Michael, Minnesota

== See also ==
- List of U.S. Marines
- Last Iwo Jima Flag Raiser and IBEW Member Charles Lindberg Dies
