= Harold G. Schrier =

United States Marine Corps officer (1916–1971)

Harold Schrier
- Born: October 17, 1916; Corder, Missouri, U.S.
- Died: June 3, 1971 (aged 54); Bradenton, Florida, U.S.
- Military career
- Allegiance: United States of America
- Branch: United States Marine Corps
- Service years: 1936–1957
- Rank: Lieutenant Colonel
- Conflicts: World War II; Battle of Midway; Battle of Guadalcanal; Battle of New Georgia; Battle of Bougainville; Battle of Iwo Jima; Korean War; Battle of Pusan Perimeter; Battle of Inchon; Battle of Chosin Reservoir
- Awards: Navy Cross; Silver Star Medal; Legion of Merit w/ Combat "V"; Bronze Star Medal w/ Combat "V"; Purple Heart Medal; Combat Action Ribbon (2)

Harold George Schrier (born "Harold George Schreier") (October 17, 1916 – June 3, 1971) was a United States Marine Corps lieutenant colonel who served in World War II and the Korean War. In World War II, he was awarded the Navy Cross for leading the patrol that captured the top of Mount Suribachi, where he helped raise the first U.S. flag on Iwo Jima on February 23, 1945. In the Korean War, he was wounded in North Korea during the Battle of Chosin Reservoir while commanding a rifle company.

The first flag flown over the southern end of Iwo Jima was regarded to be too small to be seen by the thousands of Marines fighting on the other side of the mountain where the Japanese airfields and most of their troops were located, so it was replaced the same day with a larger flag. Although there were photographs taken of the first flag flying on Mount Suribachi and some which include Schrier, there was no photograph taken of Marines raising the first flag. The second flag-raising was photographed by Associated Press combat photographer Joe Rosenthal and became famous after copies of his photograph appeared in the newspapers two days later. Schrier also was photographed near the second flag.

In 1949, Schrier appeared as himself in the war movie "Sands of Iwo Jima", where he hands the American flag to actor John Wayne (as Sergeant Stryker).

== Early years ==
Schrier was born in Corder, Missouri, on October 17, 1916. He attended high school in Lexington, Missouri.

== U.S. Marine Corps career ==
Schrier enlisted in the Marine Corps on November 12, 1936. After recruit training at Marine Corps Recruit Depot San Diego, California, he was sent to China as a US Embassy guard in Beijing. He also served in Tientsin and Shanghai. In August 1940, he became a drill instructor at Marine Corps Recruit Depot San Diego.

=== World War II ===
In early 1942, Schrier joined the 2nd Marine Raider Battalion at Camp Elliott, San Diego, being promoted to platoon sergeant in April 1942. In June 1942, he was part of two 2nd Raider Battalion companies that were sent to Midway Island to bolster the garrison there. He participated in the Battle of Guadalcanal and found himself taking part in the 2nd Marine Raider Battalion's epic "Long Patrol" behind enemy lines from November to December 1942. During this action, he distinguished himself by leading part of his cut off company to safety after his company commander erroneously led them into a hostile situation. In early 1943, he was promoted to second lieutenant in the field. Subsequently, he was detached to other duties within the Raider organization, such as observation and reconnaissance on enemy-held islands before larger units made assault landings. He was awarded the Legion of Merit for his work at Vangunu Island during the New Georgia Campaign in June 1943. He also served at Bougainville in support of military actions there. In February 1944, after the Marine Raiders were disbanded, he returned to the United States to become an infantry instructor at Marine Corps Base Camp Pendleton. He was assigned next to be the executive officer of E Company, 2nd Battalion, 28th Marine Regiment, 5th Marine Division. In September, the 5th Division left Camp Pendleton for Hawaii, for further training. In January 1945, the 5th Division left Hawaii for the assault and capture of Iwo Jima.

==== Iwo Jima ====
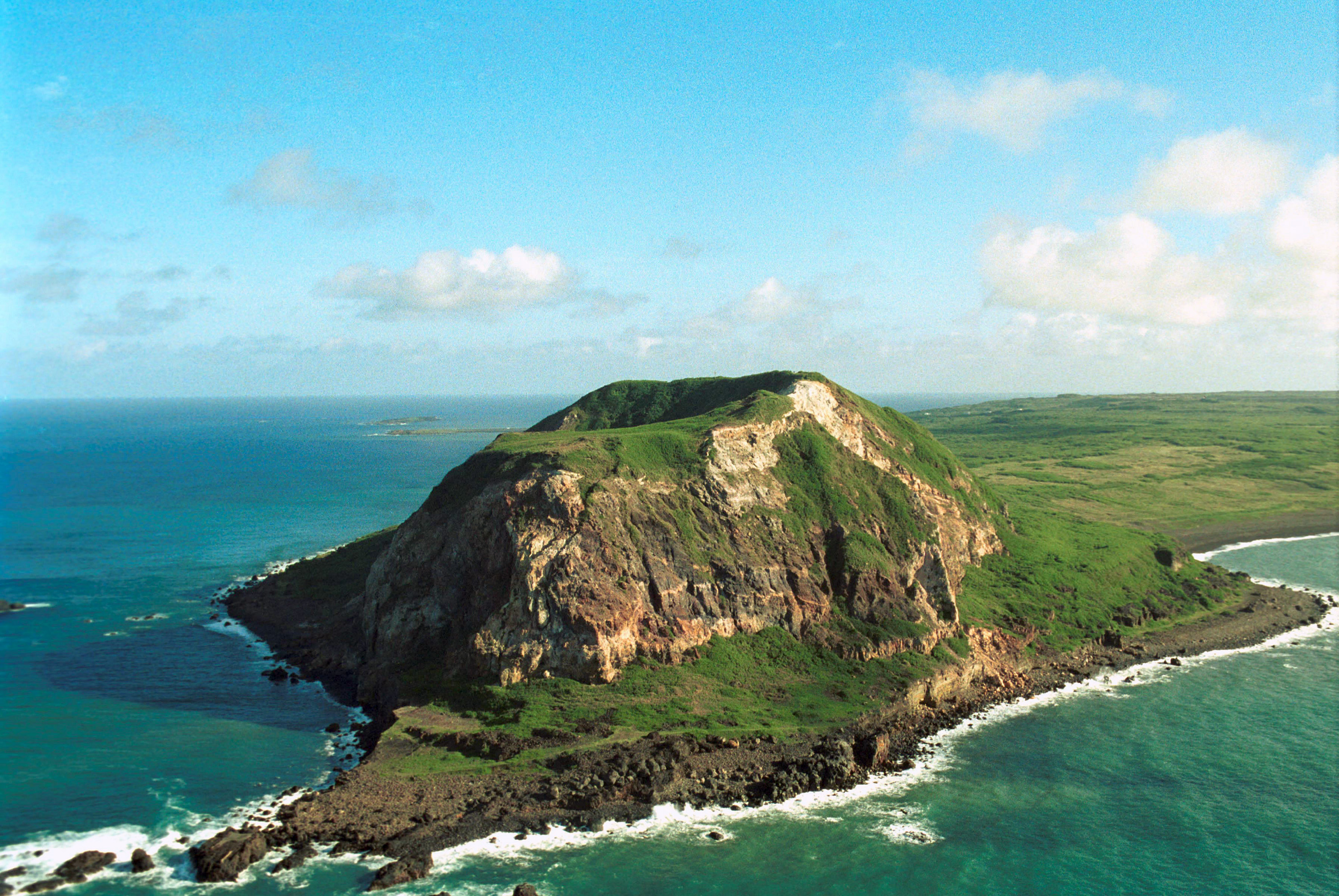
Mount Suribachi on Iwo Jima

On February 19, 1945, Lt. Schrier and E Company landed with the fifth assault wave on the southeast beach of Iwo Jima closest to Mount Suribachi, which was the 28th Marine Regiment's objective. Because of heavy fighting, the base of Mount Suribachi was not reached and surrounded until February 22.

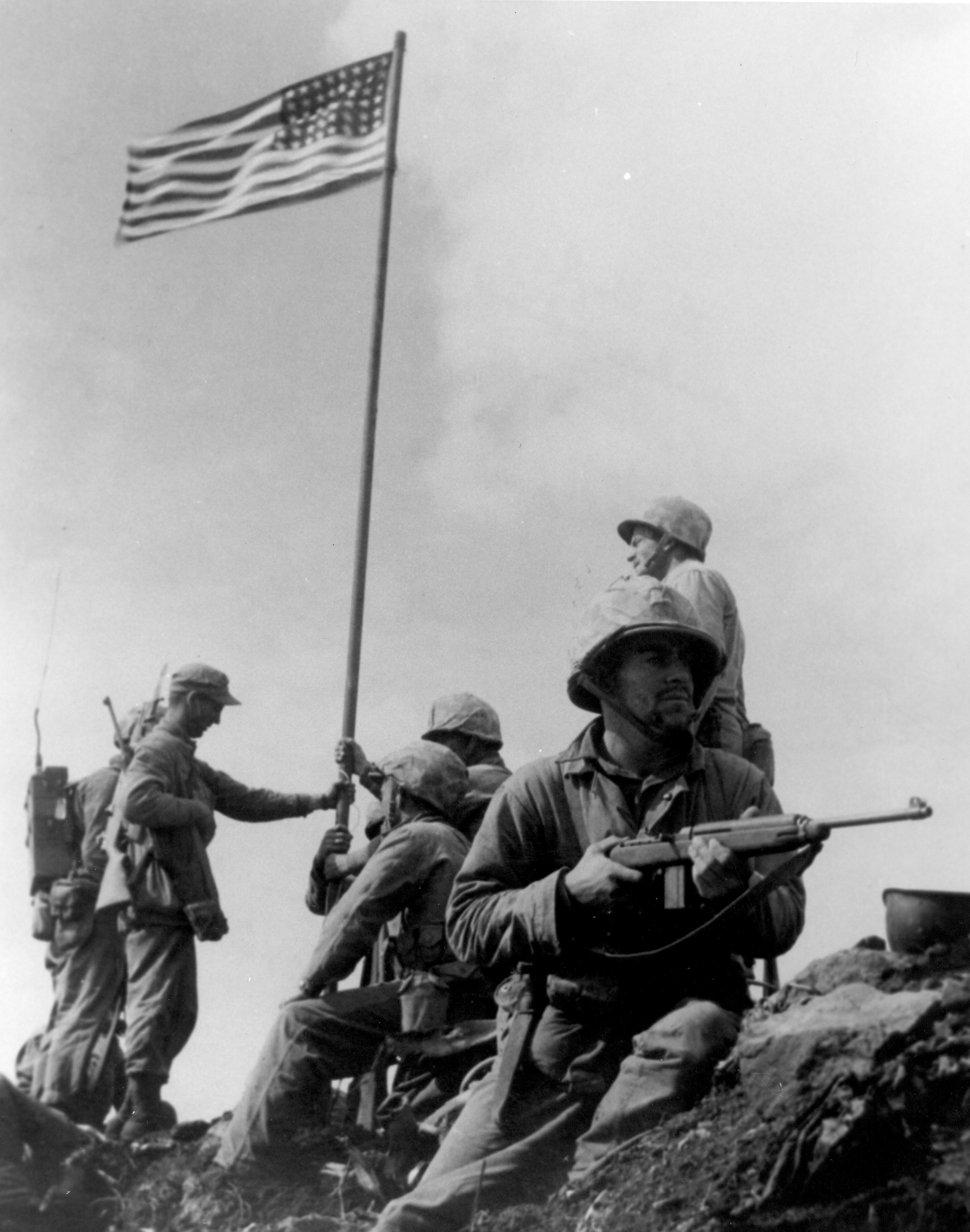
Marine Staff Sergeant Lou Lowery's photo of the first U.S. flag flown on Mount Suribachi. Left to right: 1st. Lt. Harold Schrier (left side of radioman), Pfc. Raymond Jacobs (radioman), Sgt. Henry "Hank" Hansen (soft cap, holding flagstaff), Platoon Sgt. Ernest Ivy Thomas, Jr. (seated), Pvt. Phil Ward (holding lower flagstaff), PhM2c. John Bradley, USN (standing above Ward, holding flagstaff), Pfc. James Michels (holding M1 carbine), and Cpl. Charles W. Lindberg (standing above Michels).

==== First flag raising ====
On February 23, 1945, Lieutenant Colonel Chandler W. Johnson, commander of the 2nd Battalion, 28th Marine Regiment, ordered a platoon-size patrol to climb up 556-foot Mount Suribachi. Captain Dave Severance, E Company's commander, assembled the remainder of his Third Platoon and other members of the battalion headquarters, including two Navy corpsmen and stretcher bearers. First Lieutenant Harold Schrier, E Company's executive officer, volunteered for the mission and was handed the Second Battalion's American flag from Lt. Colonel Johnson (or the battalion adjutant) measuring 28 by 54 inches (137 by 71 cm), which had been taken from the attack transport USS Missoula (APA-211) on the way to Iwo Jima by First Lieutenant George G. Wells, the Second Battalion's adjutant in charge of the battalion's flags. Lt. Schrier was to take a patrol with the flag up the mountain and raise the flag if possible at the summit to signal that Mount Suribachi was captured. At 8:30 a.m., Lt. Schrier started climbing with the patrol up the mountain. Less than an hour later, the patrol, after receiving occasional Japanese sniper fire, reached the rim of the volcano. After a brief firefight there, Lt. Schrier and his men captured the summit.

A long section of a Japanese steel water pipe was found on the mountain and the battalion's flag was tied on to it by Lt. Schrier, Sgt. Henry Hansen and Cpl. Charles Lindberg (Platoon Sergeant Ernest Thomas was watching inside the group with a grenade in his hand while Pvt. Phil Ward held the bottom of the pipe horizontally off the ground). The flagstaff was then carried to the highest part on the crater and raised by Lt. Schrier, Platoon Sgt. Thomas, Sgt. Hansen, and Cpl. Lindberg at approximately 10:30 a.m. Seeing the national colors flying caused loud cheering with some gunfire from the Marines, sailors, and Coast Guardsmen on the beach below and from the men on the ships near and docked at the beach. Due to the strong wind on Mount Suribachi, Sgt. Hansen, Pvt. Ward, and Third Platoon corpsman John Bradley helped make the flagstaff stay in a vertical position. The men at, around, and holding the flagstaff, which included Schrier's radioman Raymond Jacobs (assigned to patrol from F Company), were photographed several times by Staff Sgt. Louis R. Lowery, a photographer with Leatherneck magazine who accompanied the patrol up the mountain. A firefight with some Japanese soldiers took place, and an enemy grenade caused Sgt. Lowery to fall several feet down the side of the crater, damaging his camera but not his film.

On February 24, Lt. Schrier ordered Platoon Sgt. Thomas to report early the next morning to Marine Lieutenant General Holland Smith aboard Navy Vice Admiral Richmond K. Turner's flagship the USS Eldorado (AGC-11) about the flag raising on Mount Suribachi. On February 25, Platoon Sgt. Thomas met with the two officers and during a CBS radio news interview aboard ship, he named Lt. Schrier, Sgt. Henry Hansen, and himself as the actual flag-raisers. Rosenthal's photograph of the second flag raising appeared in the newspapers the same day as Platoon Sgt. Thomas's interview.

Lt. Schrier was awarded the Navy Cross for extraordinary heroism on February 23. Platoon Sgt. Thomas was killed on Iwo Jima on March 3 and Sgt. Hansen was killed on March 1.

==== Second flag raising ====
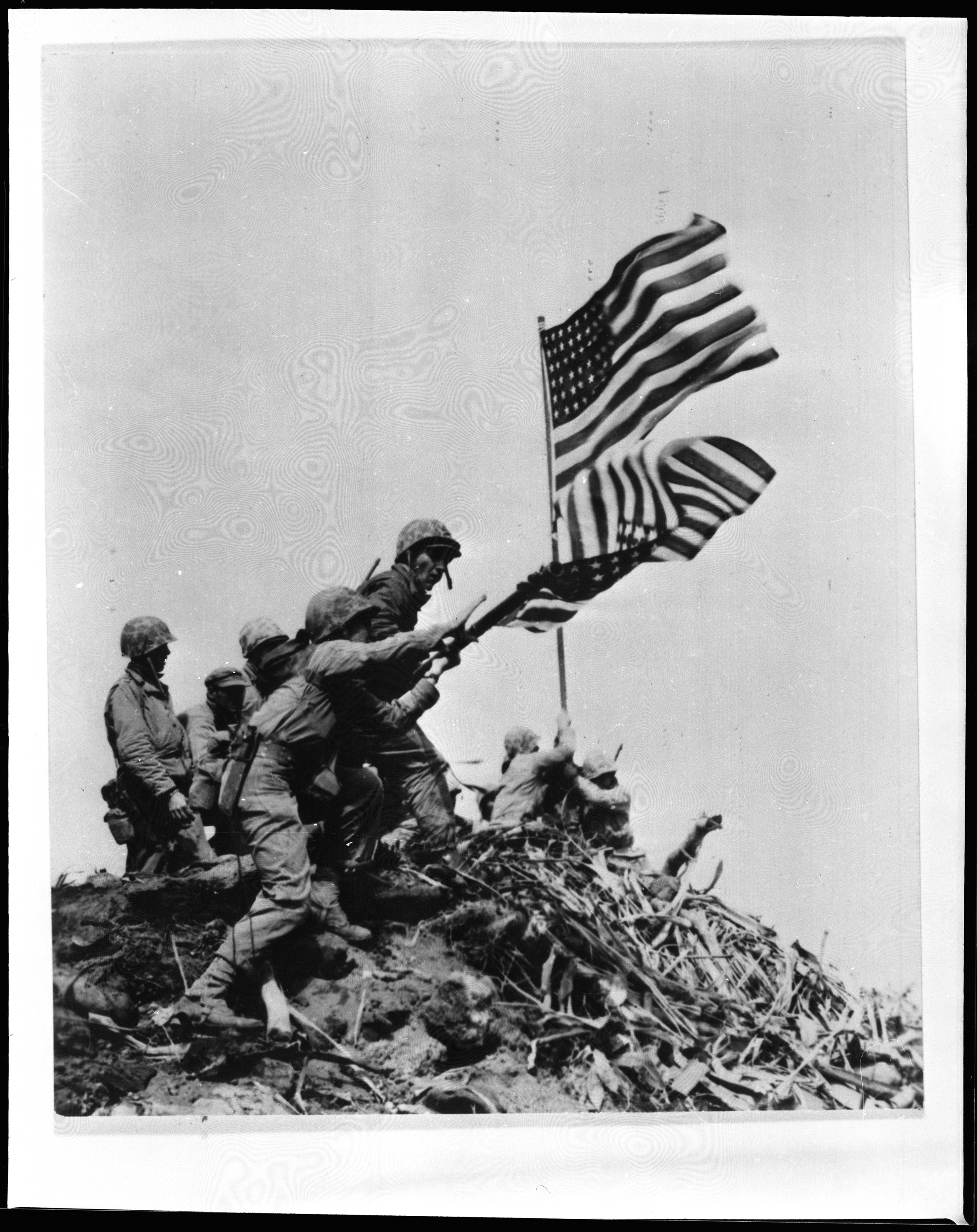
Marine Corps photo of the two flags on Mount Suribachi (Lt. Schrier, far left).

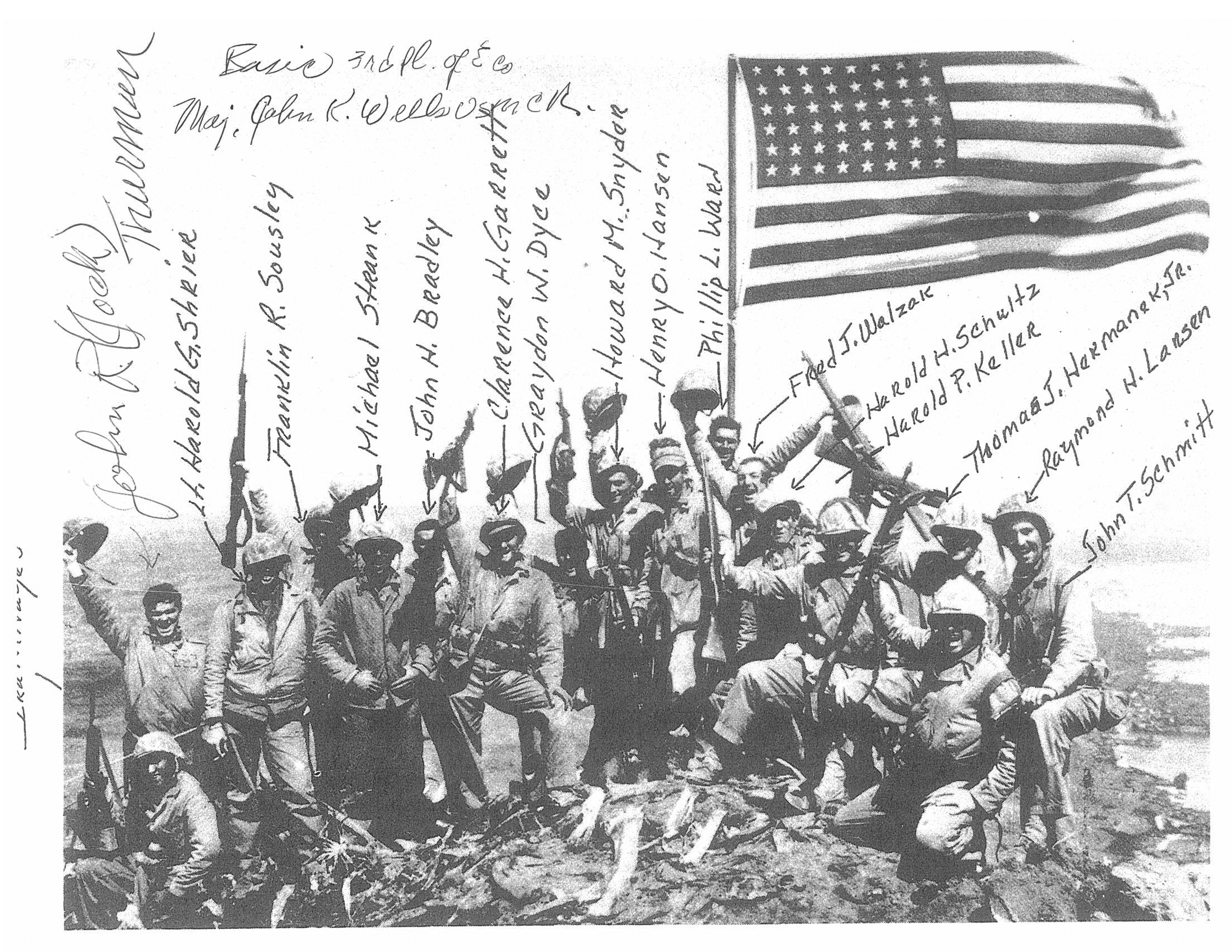
Lt. Schrier (third from left) in Joe Rosenthal's "Gung Ho" photo

On the same day that his battalion's flag was raised, Lt. Col. Johnson determined that a larger flag should replace it. The flag was too small to be seen on the other side of the mountain where three Japanese airfields and most of the Japanese troops were located, and Johnson thought that the thousands of Marines fighting there needed the inspiration from seeing the flag. A 96 by 56 inch flag was obtained from a ship docked on shore and brought up to the top of Mount Suribachi by Pfc. Rene Gagnon the Second Battalion's runner (messenger) for E Company. At the same time, Sgt. Michael Strank, Cpl. Harlon Block, Pfc. Franklin Sousley, and Pfc. Ira Hayes from Second Platoon, E Company, were sent to take communication wire or supplies up to the Third Platoon and raise the second flag. Once on top, the flag was attached to another Japanese steel pipe. Shortly before 1 p.m., Lt. Schrier ordered the second flag raised and the first flag lowered. The four Marines and Pfc. Harold Schultz and Pfc. Harold Keller (both members Lt. Schrier's patrol) raised the larger flag. The first flagstaff was lowered by three Marines and Pfc. Gagnon, who removed the flag and took it down the mountain to the battalion adjutant.

The Marines who captured Mount Suribachi and those who raised the first flag generally did not receive national recognition even though the first flag raising had received some public recognition first. The black and white photograph of the second flag raising by Joe Rosenthal of the Associated Press became world-famous after appearing in the newspapers as the flag raising on Iwo Jima. Marine combat photographer Sergeant William Genaust, who had accompanied Rosenthal and Marine photographer Pvt. Robert Campbell up Mount Suribachi, filmed the second flag raising in color and it was used in newsreels. Other combat photographers ascended the mountain after the first flag was raised and the mountaintop secured. These photographers including Rosenthal and an army photographer who was assigned to cover Marine amphibious landings for Yank Magazine, took photos of Marines (including Sgt. Hansen), corpsmen, and themselves around both of the flags. The second flag-raisers received national recognition. After the replacement flag was raised, sixteen Marines, including Schrier and Hansen, and two Navy corpsmen (John Bradley and Gerald Ziehme from the 40-man patrol) posed together for Rosenthal around the base of the flagstaff.

On February 27, Schrier left Mount Suribachi and became the commander of D Company, 2nd Battalion, 28th Marines. He was later awarded the Silver Star Medal for leading a successful counterattack on March 24 against a large number of fanatical Japanese soldiers who attacked the rear position of his lightly manned command post.

On March 14, another American flag was officially raised up a flagpole by two Marines under the orders of Lt. Gen. Holland Smith during a ceremony at the V Amphibious Corps command post on the other side of Mount Suribachi where the 3rd Marine Division troops were located. The flag flying on the summit of Mount Suribachi since February 23 was taken down. On March 26, 1945, the island was considered secure and the battle of Iwo Jima was officially ended. Lt. Schrier and the 28th Marines left Iwo Jima on March 27 and returned to Hawaii to the 5th Marine Division training camp. Lt. Col. Johnson was killed in action on March 2, Sgt. Genaust was killed on March 4, Sgt. Strank and Cpl. Block were killed on March 1, and Pfc. Sousley was killed on March 21.

Lt. Schrier served in San Diego from July to October 1945. Afterwards, he served in Seal Beach, California, Samar, Philippines, and in Yokosuka, Japan. In 1949, Captain Schrier returned to the United States and was assigned as a technical advisor (he also appeared as himself with flag raiser Ira Hayes and former corpsman John Bradley) in the motion picture Sands of Iwo Jima, starring John Wayne.

=== Korean War ===
The Korean War broke out on June 25, 1950, and Captain Schrier was sent to Korea with the 1st Provisional Marine Brigade in July. He was awarded the Bronze Star Medal for his actions while serving as the brigade adjutant in August and September during the Battle of Pusan Perimeter in South Korea. He was assigned next as the company commander of I Company, 3rd Battalion, 5th Marines, 1st Marine Division. During the Battle of Chosin Reservoir in North Korea, he was wounded in the neck on December 1, during an all-night hill fight at Hill 1520 with Chinese Communist troops. He was evacuated to Japan.

=== Retirement and death ===
Schrier was promoted to major in May 1951, and was the officer in charge of the Marine Corps recruiting station in Birmingham, Alabama. He attended as a guest the dedication ceremony of the Marine Corps War Memorial (also known as the Iwo Jima Memorial), which was inspired by Joe Rosenthal's photograph of the second flag-raising, in Arlington, Virginia on November 10, 1954. Afterwards, he was the provost marshal at the Marine Corps Recruit Depot, San Diego, California. He retired from the Marine Corps as a lieutenant colonel in 1957.

Schrier died at a hospital in Bradenton, Florida, in 1971. He is buried in Mansion Memorial Park in Ellenton, Florida.

== Military awards ==
Schrier's military decorations and awards include:

Navy Cross	Silver Star	Legion of Merit w/ Combat "V"
Bronze Star w/ Combat "V"	Purple Heart	Combat Action Ribbon w/ one 5/16" Gold Star
Navy and Marine Corps Presidential Unit Citation w/ three 3/16" Bronze Stars	Marine Corps Good Conduct Medal	China Service Medal
American Defense Service Medal	American Campaign Medal	Asiatic-Pacific Campaign Medal w/ one 3/16" Silver Star
World War II Victory Medal	National Defense Service Medal	Korean Service Medal w/ three 3/16" Bronze Stars
Republic of Korea Presidential Unit Citation	United Nations Korea Medal	Republic of Korea War Service Medal

=== Navy Cross citation ===
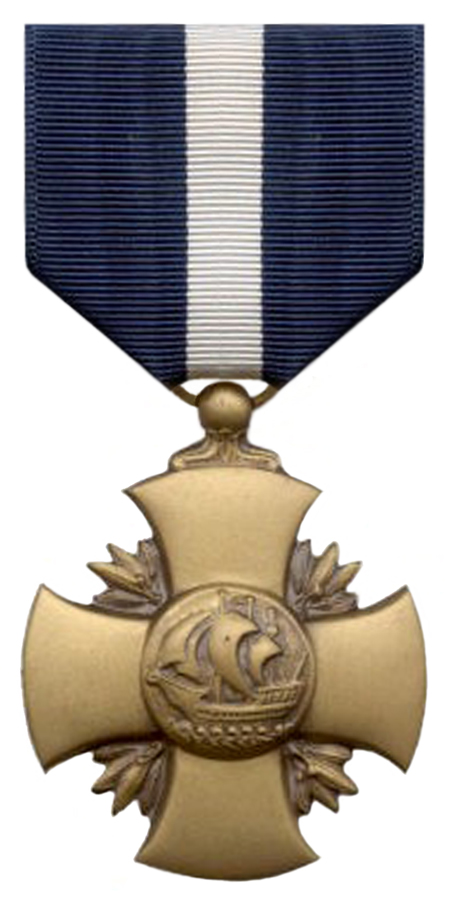

The President of the United States takes pleasure in presenting the NAVY CROSS to

FIRST LIEUTENANT HAROLD G. SCHRIER
UNITED STATES MARINE CORPS

for service as set forth in the following

CITATION:

"For extraordinary heroism as Executive Officer of Company E, Second Battalion, Twenty-Eighth Marines, Fifth Marine Division, in action against enemy Japanese forces on Iwo Jima, Volcano Islands, on 23 February 1945. On the morning of 23 February when his combat team had advanced to the base of Mount Suribachi after four days of severe fighting, First Lieutenant SCHRIER volunteered to lead a forty-man patrol up the steep slopes of the mountain. Quickly organizing his patrol and placing himself at its head, he began the tortuous climb up the side of the volcano, followed by his patrol in single file. Employing the only known approach, an old Japanese trail, he swiftly pushed on until, covered by all the supporting weapons of his battalion, he gained the top of the mountain despite hostile small arms and artillery fire. Forced to engage the remaining enemy in a sharp fire fight, he overcame them without loss in his patrol and occupied the rim of the volcano. Although still under enemy sniper fire, First Lieutenant SCHRIER, assisted by his Platoon Sergeant, raised the National Colors over Mount Suribachi, planting the flagstaff firmly on the highest knoll overlooking the crater, the first American flag to fly over any land in the inner defenses of the Japanese Empire. His inspiring leadership, courage and determination in the face of overwhelming odds upheld the highest traditions of the United States Naval Service."

For the President,
JOHN L. SULLIVAN
Secretary of the Navy

=== Silver Star Citation ===
Silver Star Medal

"The President of the United States of America takes pleasure in presenting the Silver Star Medal to First Lieutenant Harold George Schrier, United States Marine Corps, for conspicuous gallantry and intrepidity as Commanding Officer of Company D, Second Battalion, Twenty-eighth Marines, Fifth Marine Division, in action against enemy Japanese forces on Iwo Jima, Volcano Islands, on 24 March 1945. Realizing the seriousness of the situation when a group of approximately one hundred Japanese infiltrated through the main defensive positions shortly after midnight and launched a fanatical attack against the rear of his lightly manned command post, First Lieutenant Schrier boldly rallied his men and opposed the onrushing enemy, setting a courageous example. His leadership and fighting spirit throughout this action were in keeping with the highest traditions of the United States Naval Service. For the President, John L. Sullivan, Secretary of the Navy"

=== Legion of Merit ===
Awarded for actions during the World War II

"The President of the United States of America takes pleasure in presenting the Legion of Merit to Second Lieutenant Harold George Schrier (MCSN: 0–19234), United States Marine Corps, for exceptionally meritorious conduct in the performance of outstanding services to the Government of the United States as a member of a reconnaissance party attached to the First Marine Raider Regiment operating in the Solomon Islands Area from 13 to 30 June 1943. Preceding the landing of our invasion forces, Second Lieutenant Schrier with his party made his way by canoe to the enemy-held Vangunu Island and for two days, in the face of extreme danger, stayed close to the hostile lines in order to observe troop concentrations, bivouac areas, possible gun positions and trails. When the other members of his party left, he dauntlessly remained in the Japanese-infested area and nine days later flashed signals to the approaching ships and guided troops to the beach. By his devotion to duty in supplying accurate and vital information to the commanding officers, Second Lieutenant Schrier contributed materially to the capture of the area and upheld the highest traditions of the United States Naval Service.

General Orders: Heroes U.S. Marine Corps, 1861 – 1955: Jane Blakeney

Action Date: June 13 – 30, 1943

Service: Marine Corps

Rank: Second Lieutenant

Regiment: 1st Marine Raider Regiment"

http://valor.militarytimes.com/recipient.php?recipientid=8139

== Portrayal in films ==
- Sands of Iwo Jima, 1949 (Capt. Harold G. Schrier, USMC as Lieutenant Harold Schrier, USMC).
- Flags of Our Fathers, 2006 (Lieutenant Schrier, USMC, was played by actor Jason Gray-Stanford).

== See also ==
- Raising the Flag on Iwo Jima
- Battle of Iwo Jima
- Marine Corps War Memorial
