= Ernest Ivy Thomas Jr. =

American Marine Corps platoon sergeant (1924-1945)

Ernest Thomas
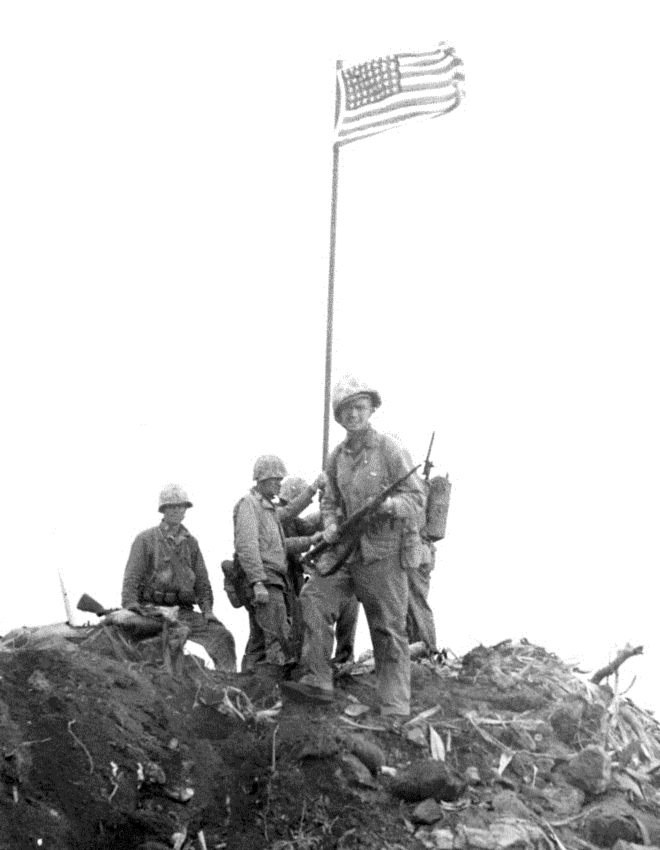
- Platoon Sergeant Ernest Thomas (foreground, facing front) after he helped raise the flag on Mount Suribachi
- Born: March 10, 1924; Tampa, Florida, US
- Died: March 3, 1945 (aged 20); Iwo Jima, Bonin Islands, Japanese Empire
- Military career
- Allegiance: United States of America
- Branch: United States Marine Corps
- Service years: 1942–1945
- Rank: Platoon Sergeant
- Nickname: Boots
- Units: 2nd Battalion, 28th Marines, 5th Marine Division
- Conflicts: World War II: Volcano and Ryukyu Islands campaign; Battle of Iwo Jima †
- Awards: Navy Cross; Purple Heart Medal; Combat Action Ribbon

Ernest Ivy "Boots" Thomas Jr. (March 10, 1924 – March 3, 1945) was a United States Marine Corps platoon sergeant who was killed in action during the Battle of Iwo Jima in World War II. He was awarded the Navy Cross for extraordinary heroism while fighting for and at the base of Mount Suribachi. Two days later he was a member of the patrol that captured the top of Mount Suribachi where he helped raise the first U.S. flag on Iwo Jima on February 23, 1945. He was killed eight days after that.

The first flag flown over the southern end of Iwo Jima was regarded to be too small to be seen by the thousands of Marines fighting on the other side of the mountain where the Japanese airfields and most of their troops were located, so it was replaced the same day with a larger flag. Although there were photographs taken of the first flag flying on Mount Suribachi and some which include Thomas, there was no photograph taken of Marines raising the first flag. The second flag-raising was photographed by Associated Press combat photographer Joe Rosenthal and became famous after copies of his photograph appeared in the newspapers two days later. Thomas also was photographed near the second flag.

== Early life ==
Ernest Thomas was born in Tampa, Florida, the son of Ernest and Martha Thomas. When he was a child, his family moved to Monticello, Florida. He graduated from high school in Monticello and was attending Tri-State University in Angola, Indiana, studying aeronautical engineering, when he decided to enlist in the Marine Corps at Orlando, Florida. "Boots" was color blind and as a result, failed the medical test allowing him to enlist twice. On his third attempt, he memorized the patterns provided by a man sitting next to him in the testing station, and passed.

== World War II ==
=== U.S. Marine Corps ===
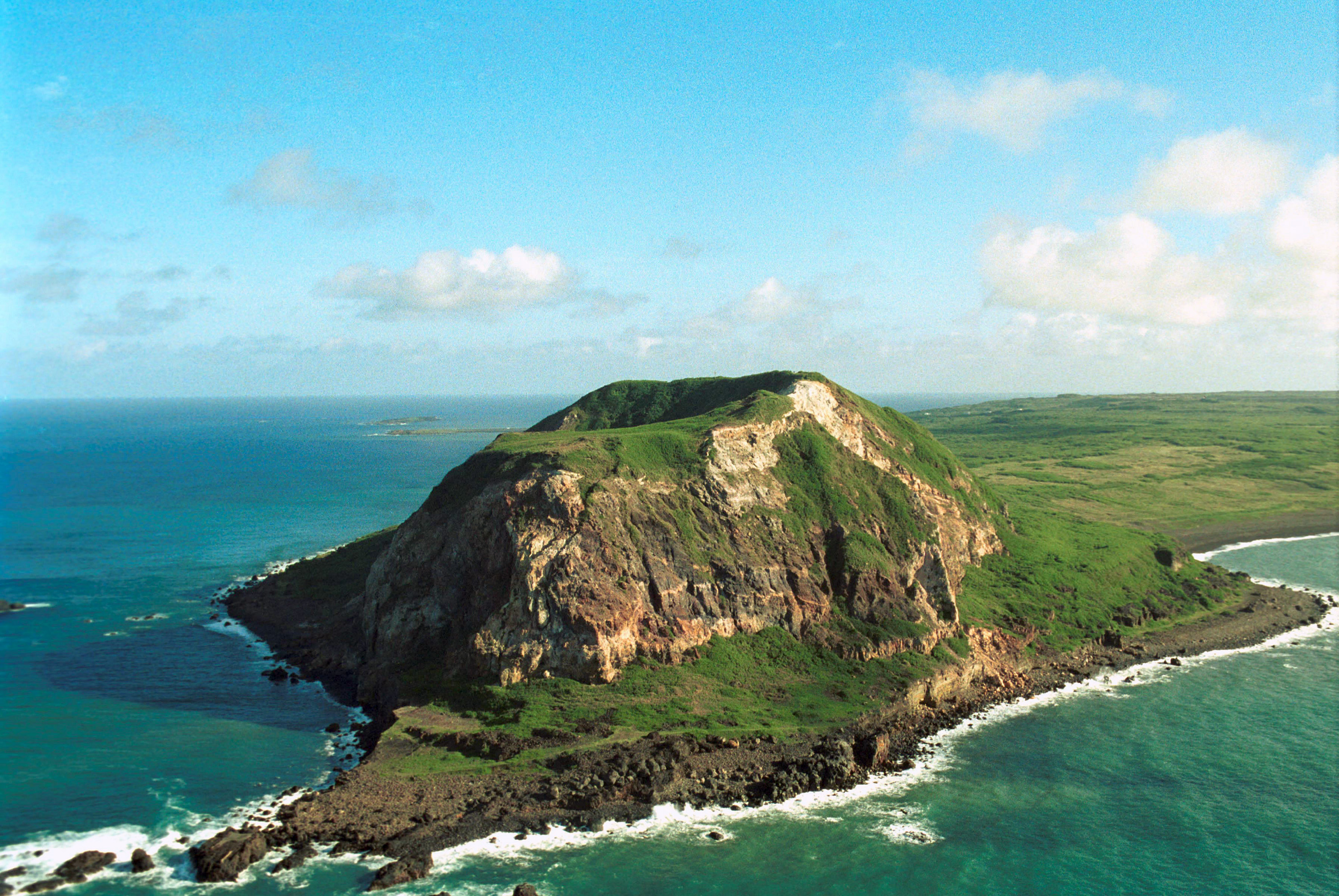
Mount Suribachi on Iwo Jima

Thomas enlisted in the Marine Corps on May 27, 1942. He completed boot camp at Parris Island, South Carolina, and remained there as an instructor. Afterwards, he was an instructor at Camp Lejeune, North Carolina. In March 1944, he was assigned to E Company, 2nd Battalion, 28th Marine Regiment, 5th Marine Division at Camp Pendleton, CA. In September, his company was sent to Camp Tarawa in Hawaii to train with the 5th division for the Battle of Iwo Jima. In January 1945, the 5th division left for Iwo Jima.

==== Battle of Iwo Jima ====
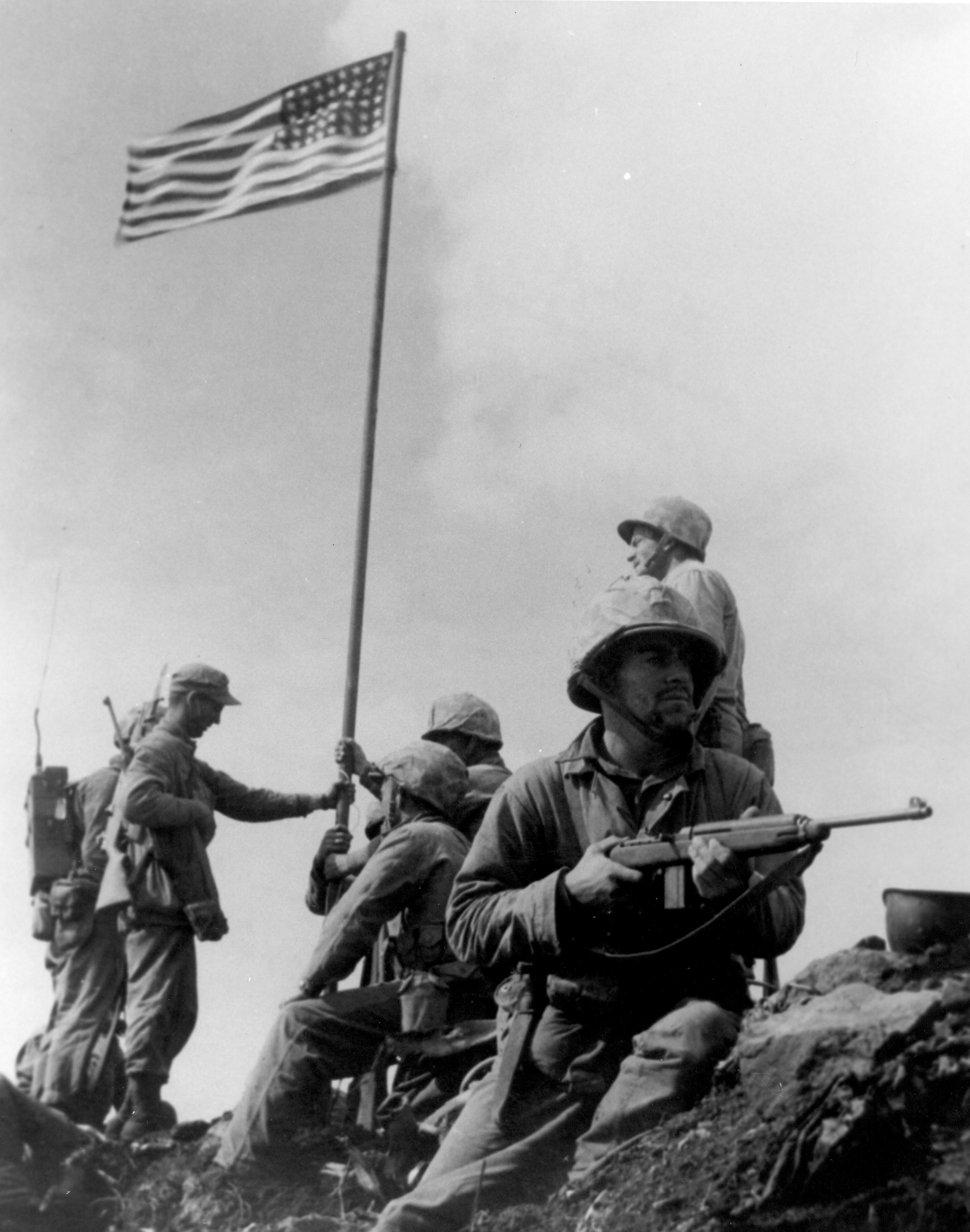
Staff Sergeant Lou Lowery's most widely circulated image of the first American flag flown on Mount Suribachi. Left to right: 1st. Lt. Harold G. Schrier (left side of radioman), Pfc. Raymond Jacobs (radioman), Sgt. Henry Hansen (soft cap, holding flagstaff), Pvt. Phil Ward (holding lower flagstaff), Plt. Sgt. Thomas (seated), PhM2c. John Bradley, USN (holding flagstaff above Ward), Pfc. James Michels (holding M1 carbine), and Cpl. Charles W. Lindberg (standing above Michels).

Marine Sgt. Bill Genaust's color film of the second flag raising (Plt. Sgt. Thomas watching)

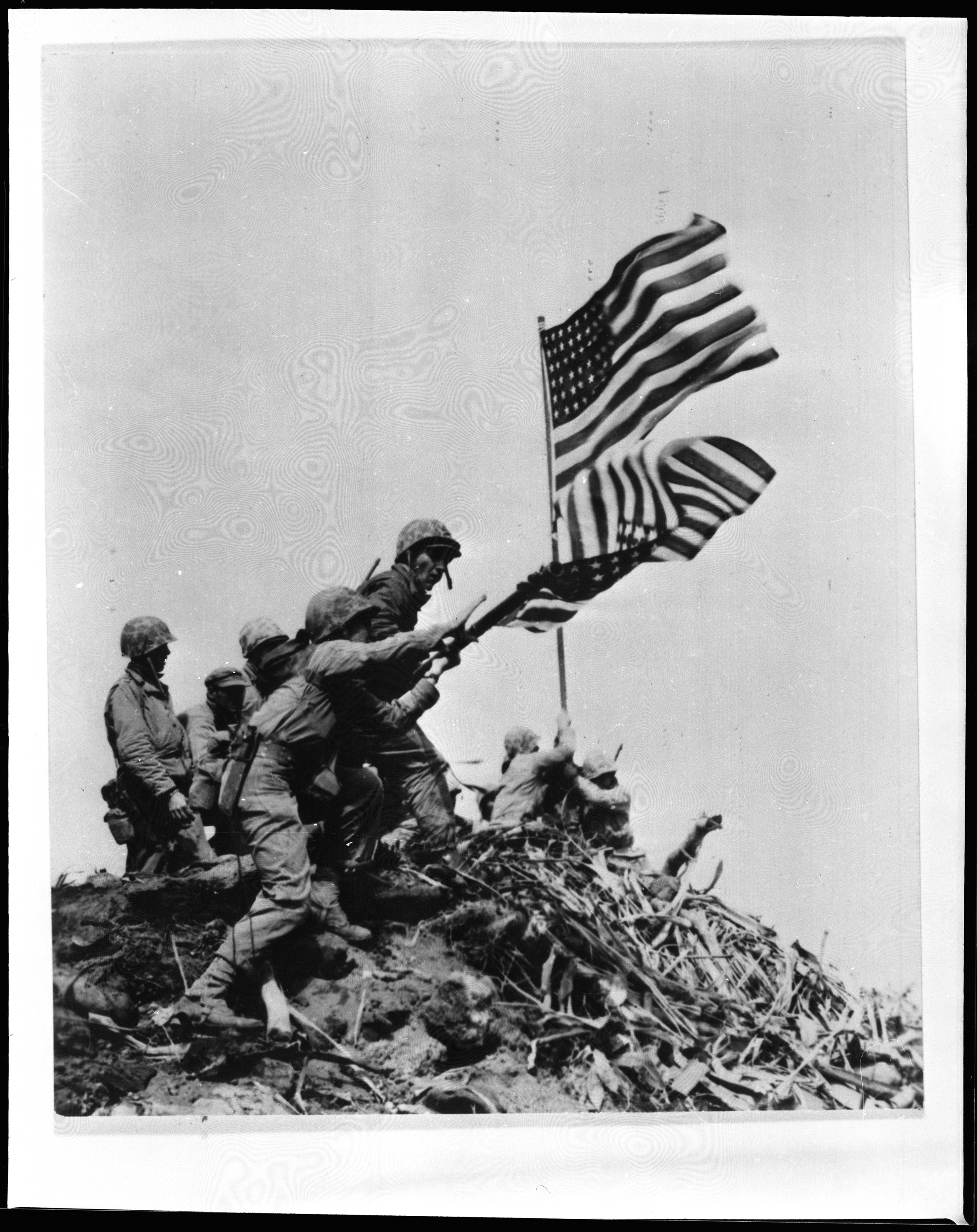
Marine Corps photo of the two flags on Mount Suribachi (Platoon Sgt. Thomas, third from left)

Thomas was a rifle company platoon sergeant with Third Platoon, E Company, 2nd Battalion, 28th Marines. On February 19, his unit landed with the first wave of Marines on the southern beach of Iwo Jima towards Mount Suribachi. On February 21, Thomas took over the command of the Third Platoon from his platoon commander who was wounded. Thomas and his men successfully assaulted a heavily fortified hostile sector at the base of Mount Suribachi. Thomas directed tank fire while under fire during the Marine assaults on the Japanese, and combined with his other actions that day, this would eventually contribute to the capture of the mountain on February 23 by Thomas and his platoon. He was posthumously awarded the Navy Cross for extraordinary heroism on February 21.

==== First flag-raising ====
On February 23, 1945, Lieutenant Colonel Chandler W. Johnson, commander of the 2nd Battalion, 28th Marine Regiment, ordered a platoon-size patrol to climb up 556-foot Mount Suribachi. Captain Dave Severance, E Company's commander, assembled the remainder of his Third Platoon and other members of the battalion headquarters including two Navy corpsmen and stretcher bearers. First Lieutenant Harold Schrier, E Company's executive officer, was handed the Second Battalion's American flag from Lt. Colonel Johnson (or the battalion adjutant) measuring 28 by 54 inches (137 by 71 cm) which had been taken from the attack transport USS Missoula (APA-211) on the way to Iwo Jima by First Lieutenant George G. Wells the Second Battalion's adjutant in charge of the battalion's flags. Lt. Schrier was to it take a patrol with the flag up the mountain and raise the flag if possible at the summit to signal that Mount Suribachi was captured and the top secure. At 8:30 a.m., Lt. Schrier started climbing with the patrol up the mountain. Less than an hour later, the patrol, after receiving occasional Japanese sniper fire, reached the rim of the volcano. After a brief firefight there, Lt. Schrier and his men captured the summit.

A section of a Japanese steel water pipe was found on the mountain and the battalion's flag Lt. Schrier had carried was tied on to it by Lt. Schrier, Sgt. Henry Hansen and Cpl. Lindberg (Platoon Sergeant Ernest Thomas was watching inside the group with a grenade in his hand while Pvt. Phil Ward held the bottom of the pipe horizontally off the ground). The flagstaff was then carried to the highest part on the crater and raised by Lt. Schrier, Platoon Sgt. Thomas, Sgt. Hansen, and Cpl. Lindberg at approximately 10:30 a.m. Seeing the national colors flying caused loud cheering with some gunfire from the Marines, sailors, and Coast Guardsmen on the beach below and from the men on the ships near and docked at the beach; ships' whistles and horns sounded too. Due to the strong wind on Mount Suribachi, Sgt. Hansen, Pvt. Ward, and Third Platoon corpsman John Bradley helped make the flagstaff stay in a vertical position. The men at, around, and holding the flagstaff which included Schrier's radioman Raymond Jacobs (assigned to patrol from F Company), were photographed several times by Staff Sgt. Louis R. Lowery, a photographer with Leatherneck magazine who accompanied the patrol up the mountain. A firefight with some Japanese soldiers took place, an enemy grenade almost wounded or killed Sgt. Lowery which caused him to fall several feet down the side of the crater, damaging his camera but not his film.

On February 24, Schrier ordered Thomas to report to the flagship USS Eldorado (AGC-11) the next morning to meet with Vice Admiral Richmond K. Turner and Lieutenant General Holland Smith about the flag raising. On February 25, Platoon Sgt. Thomas met with the two commanders and during an interview with a CBS news broadcaster aboard ship, he named Lt. Schrier, Sgt. Hansen, and himself as the actual flag-raisers. Platoon Sgt. Thomas then returned to his platoon, which was still positioned on top of Mount Suribachi.

Platoon Sgt. Thomas was killed on March 3 and Sgt. Hansen was killed on March 1.

==== Second flag-raising ====
On the same day his battalion's flag was raised, Lt. Col. Johnson determined that a larger flag should replace it. The flag was too small to be seen on the north side of Mount Suribachi where thousands of Marines were fighting most of the Japanese. A 96 by 56 inch flag was obtained from a ship docked on shore and brought up to the top of Mount Suribachi by Pfc. Rene Gagnon, the Second Battalion's runner (messenger) for E Company. At the same time, Sgt. Michael Strank, Cpl. Harlon Block, Pfc. Franklin Sousley, and Pfc. Ira Hayes from Second Platoon, E Company, were sent to take communication wire (or supplies) up to Third Platoon and raise the second flag. Once on top, the flag was attached to another Japanese steel pipe. The four Marines and Pfc. Harold Schultz and Pfc. Harold Keller (both members of Lt. Schrier's patrol) raised the larger flag. At the same time the second flag was raised, the original flag was lowered and taken down the mountain to the battalion adjutant by Pfc. Gagnon.

On March 14, an American flag was officially raised up a flagpole by orders of Lieutenant General Holland Smith at the V Amphibious Corps command post on the other side of Mount Suribachi where the 3rd Marine Division troops were located, and the second flag which was raised on February 23 on Mount Suribachi came down. Lt. Col. Johnson was killed on March 2, Sgt. Strank and Cpl. Block were killed on March 1, and Pfc. Sousley was killed on March 21.

Joe Rosenthal's (Associated Press) historic photograph of the second flag-raising on February 23, 1945, appeared in Sunday newspapers on February 25, as the flag-raising on Mount Suribachi. This flag raising was also filmed in color by Marine Sgt. Bill Genaust (killed in action in March) and was used in newsreels. Other combat photographers with and besides Rosenthal ascended the mountain after the first flag was raised and the mountaintop secured. These photographers including Rosenthal and Pfc. George Burns, an army photographer who was assigned to cover Marine amphibious landings for Yank Magazine, took photos of Marines (including Thomas), corpsmen, and themselves, around both of the flags. The second flag-raisers received national recognition. The three survivors (two were found out to be incorrectly identified) of the flag raising were called to Washington, D.C. after the battle by President Franklin D. Roosevelt to participate in a bond tour to raise much needed money to pay for the war. The Marines who captured Mount Suribachi and those who raised the first flag including Platoon Sgt. Thomas, generally did not receive national recognition even though the first flag raising and Thomas had received some public recognition first.

==== Death and burial ====
On March 3, Platoon Sgt. Thomas was killed by enemy sniper rifle fire at the north side of Iwo Jima. He was posthumously awarded the Navy Cross (for the February 21 action) and the Purple Heart Medal. He was buried at the 5th Marine Division cemetery on Iwo Jima where a service was held on March 26, the morning of the day the battle ended.

In 1948, Thomas's body was returned to Monticello, Florida. He was buried at Roseland Cemetery in Jefferson County, Florida.

== Military awards ==
Thomas's military decorations and awards include:

	Navy Cross	
Purple Heart Medal	Navy Combat Action Ribbon	Navy Presidential Unit Citation
American Campaign Medal	Asiatic-Pacific Campaign Medal with one 3/16" bronze star	World War II Victory Medal

=== Navy Cross citation ===
Thomas' Navy Cross citation reads as follows:

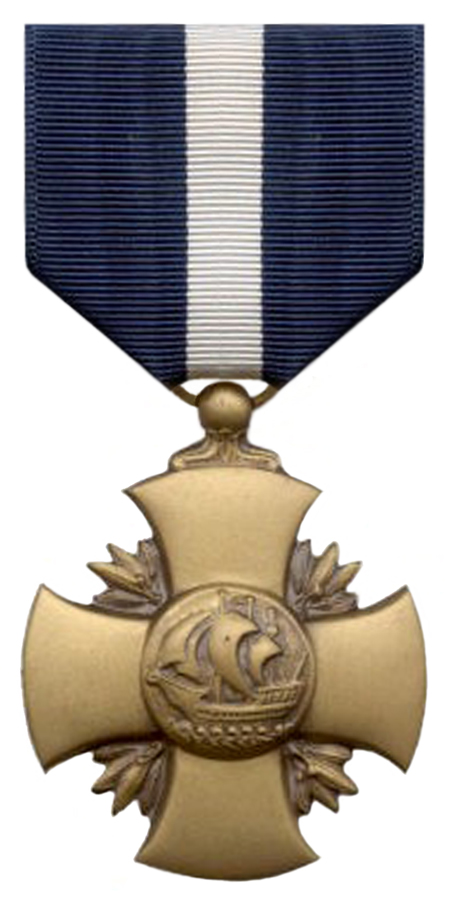

Citation:

The Navy Cross is presented posthumously to Ernest I. Thomas Jr., United States Marine Corps Reserve, for extraordinary heroism as a Rifle Platoon Leader serving with Company E, Second Battalion, Twenty-Eighth Marines, Fifth Marine Division, during action on enemy Japanese-held Iwo Jima, Volcano Islands, 21 February 1945. When his platoon leader was wounded, Platoon Sergeant Thomas assumed command and, before supporting tanks arrived to cover him, led his men in an assault on a fanatically defended and heavily fortified hostile sector at the base of Mount Suribachi. With the tanks unable to proceed over the rough terrain beyond positions 75 to 100 yards at the rear of our attacking forces, Platoon Sergeant Thomas ran repeatedly to the nearest tank, and in a position exposed to heavy and accurate machine-gun and mortar barrages, directed the fire of the tanks against the Japanese pillboxes which were retarding his platoon's advance. After each trip to the tanks, he returned to his men and led them in assaulting and neutralizing enemy emplacements, continuing to advance against the Japanese with a knife as his only weapon after the destruction of his rifle by hostile fire. Under his aggressive leadership, the platoon killed all the enemy in the sector and contributed materially to the eventual capture of Mount Suribachi. His daring initiative, fearless leadership and unwavering devotion to duty were inspiring to those with whom he served and reflect the highest credit upon Platoon Sergeant Thomas and the United States Naval Service.

== Other honors ==
A monument on U.S. Highway 90, Monticello, Florida, honors Thomas. It is inscribed with the following words:

In recognition of Platoon Sergeant Ernest I. Thomas USMCR who on February 23, 1945, led his platoon to raise the first flag on Iwo Jima, the first Japanese territory taken in World War II. On March 3, eight days after the first flag raising and ten days after he earned the Navy Cross for heroism in action, he was killed leading his men in combat.
March 10, 1924 - March 3, 1945.

== Cultural depictions ==
In the 2006 film Flags of Our Fathers, Thomas was played by American actor Brian Kimmet.

== See also ==
- Marine Corps War Memorial
