= Joe Rosenthal =

American photographer (1911–2006)

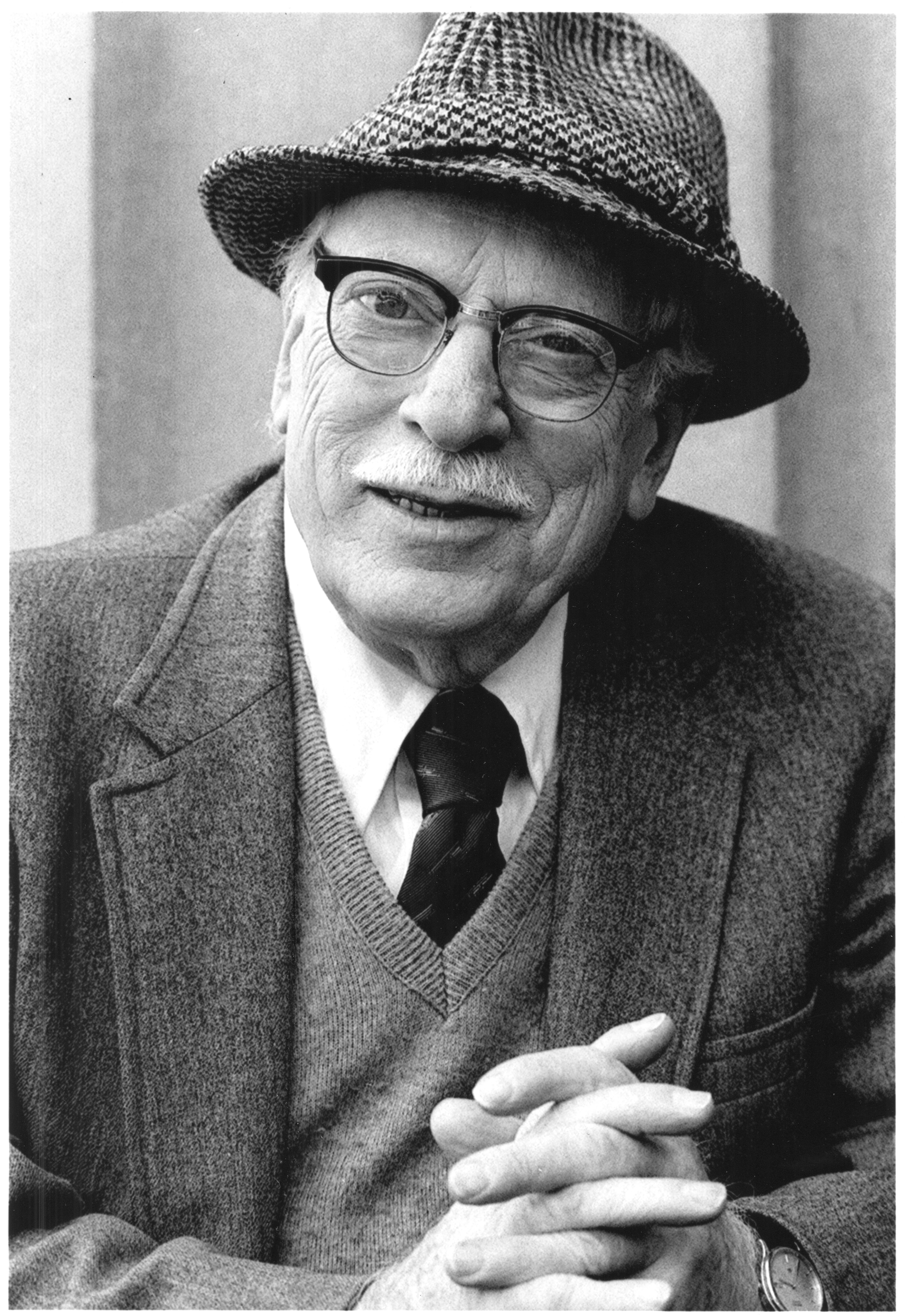
- Rosenthal in 1990
- Born: Joseph John Rosenthal; October 9, 1911; Washington, D.C., U.S.
- Died: August 20, 2006 (aged 94); Novato, California, U.S.
- Occupations: Photographer; reporter
- Known for: Raising the Flag on Iwo Jima photograph
- Awards: Pulitzer Prize; Navy Distinguished Public Service Award

Joseph John Rosenthal (October 9, 1911 – August 20, 2006) was an American photographer who received the Pulitzer Prize for his iconic World War II photograph Raising the Flag on Iwo Jima, taken during the 1945 Battle of Iwo Jima. His picture became one of the best-known photographs of the war, and was replicated as the United States Marine Corps War Memorial in Arlington County, Virginia.

== Early life ==
Joseph Rosenthal was born on October 9, 1911, in Washington, D.C. His parents were Russian-Jewish immigrants. He had four brothers. His interest in photography started as a hobby during the Great Depression. He graduated from McKinley High School in 1929, and after working as an office boy, he moved to San Francisco where he became a reporter-photographer for The San Francisco News in 1932. He attended the University of San Francisco from 1941 to 1943, and converted to Catholicism while in attendance there.

== World War II ==
Rosenthal was rejected by the U.S. Army as a photographer because of poor eyesight. In 1941, he joined the staff of the Associated Press (AP). In 1943, he joined the United States Maritime Service as a photographer and served as a warrant officer documenting life aboard ship in the British Isles and North Africa. In 1944, he rejoined the Associated Press and followed the United States Army and U.S. Marine Corps in the Pacific Theater of Operations as a war correspondent at Hollandia, New Guinea, Guam, Peleliu, Angaur, and Iwo Jima.

=== Flag-raising photo ===
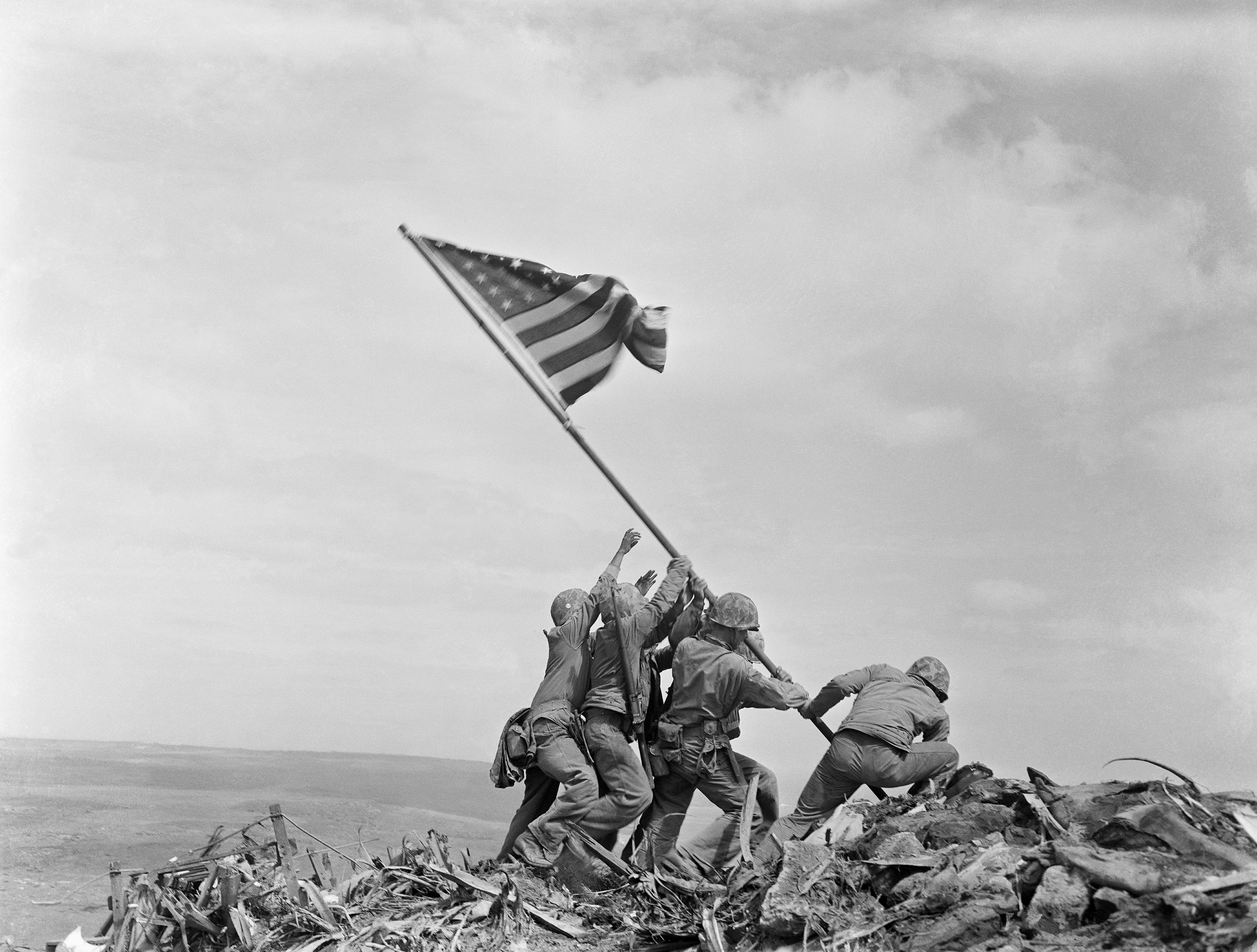
Raising the Flag on Iwo Jima

On Friday morning, February 23, 1945, four days after the Marines landed at Iwo Jima, Rosenthal was making his daily visit to the island on a Marine landing craft when he heard that an American flag was being raised atop Mount Suribachi, a volcano at the southern tip of the island. Upon landing, Rosenthal hurried toward Suribachi, lugging along his bulky Speed Graphic camera, the standard for press photographers at the time. Together with Marine combat still photographer Pvt. Bob Campbell and Marine color movie photographer Sgt. Bill Genaust, he began the climb up to the summit of Mount Suribachi. When they got about halfway up, they met Staff Sgt. Louis Lowery, a photographer with the Marine publication Leatherneck who was coming down the volcano after an enemy grenade explosion on top had knocked him off his feet and broke his camera. Lowery told them that the flag had already been raised at 10:40 am, and he had gotten photos of the flag on the summit. Lowery told them the view was good from the summit, and Rosenthal convinced Genaust and Campbell to continue to take him to the top with them since they were armed.

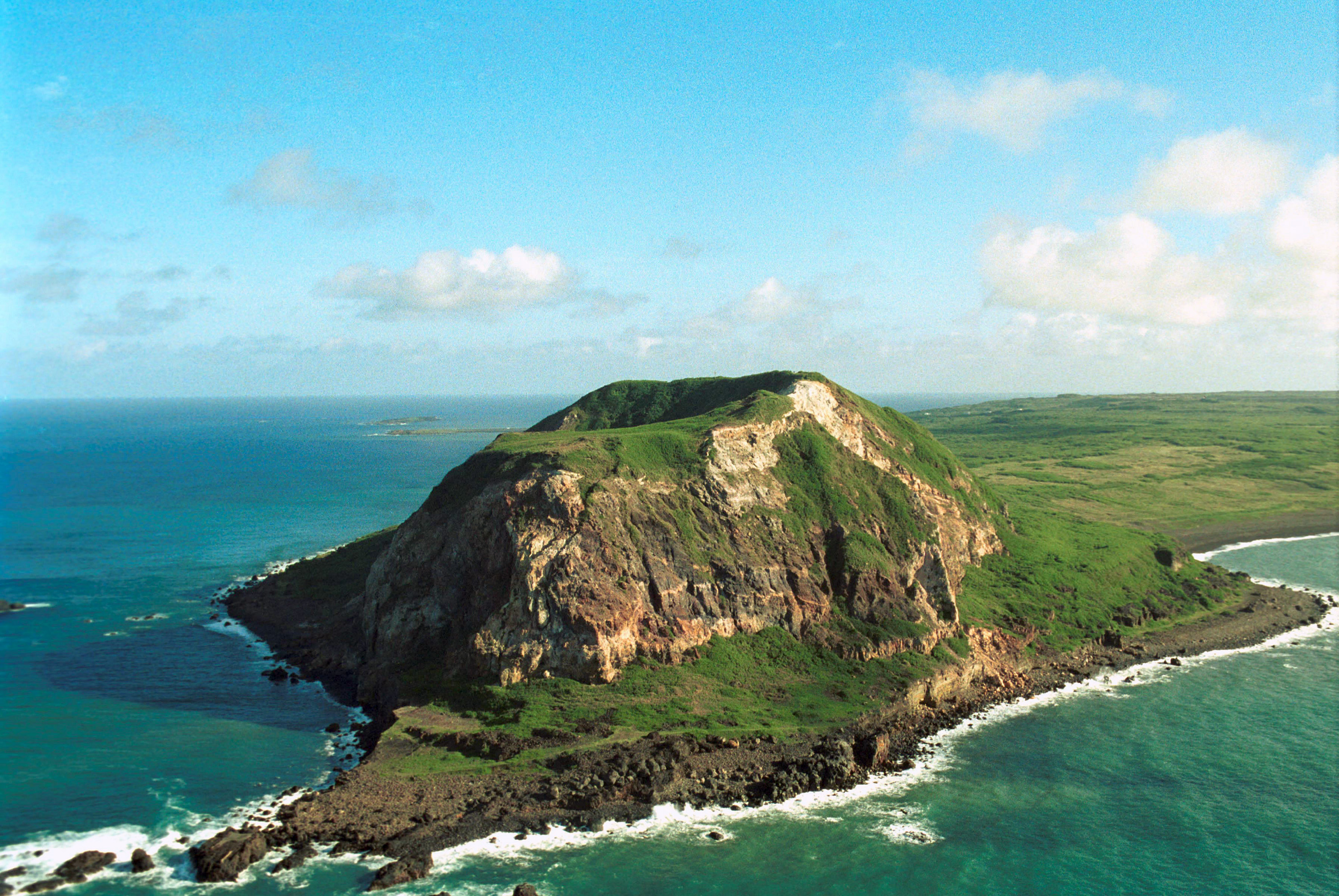
Mount Suribachi on Iwo Jima

On the high and windy summit of Mount Suribachi, Rosenthal discovered a group of Marines attaching a large flag to a length of steel pipe. Nearby, he saw the smaller flag flying and managed to get himself photoed by Campbell under the flag with Sgt. Genaust and Army Pfc. George Burn, a photographer for Yank, the Army Weekly. Another group of Marines was getting ready to lower the smaller flag at the same instant the larger flag was raised under an officer's orders. Rosenthal briefly contemplated attempting to photograph both of the flags at once, but was not in a position to get both flags in the photograph (Pvt. Campbell did capture an image of the first flag coming down while the second flag was going up), so he focused his attention on the group of men preparing to raise the second flag.

Rosenthal piled stones and a sandbag so he had something on which to stand, as he was only 5 feet and 5 inches (1.65 m) tall. He set his camera for a lens setting between f/8 and f/11 and the shutter speed at 1/400th second. Then, out of the corner of his eye, he saw six Marines start to raise the second flag. He swung his camera around toward the action and pushed the shutter. Three feet to his right, Sgt. Genaust captured the flag-raising from nearly the same angle using color motion picture film. To make sure he had a worthwhile photo to send to the AP, Rosenthal took another black and white photograph showing four of the second flag-raisers steadying the flagstaff and waiting for the bottom of the pipe to be more secured with rocks; and afterwards a rope. When that was done, Rosenthal gathered a group of sixteen Marines and two Navy corpsmen around the base of the flagstaff for a posed shot (called the "Gung Ho" photo) which included First Lieutenant Harold Schrier, the only officer on the summit, who had volunteered to take the 40-man patrol up Mount Suribachi that morning to seize and occupy the crest and raise the battalion's flag.

==== Impact of flag-raising photo ====
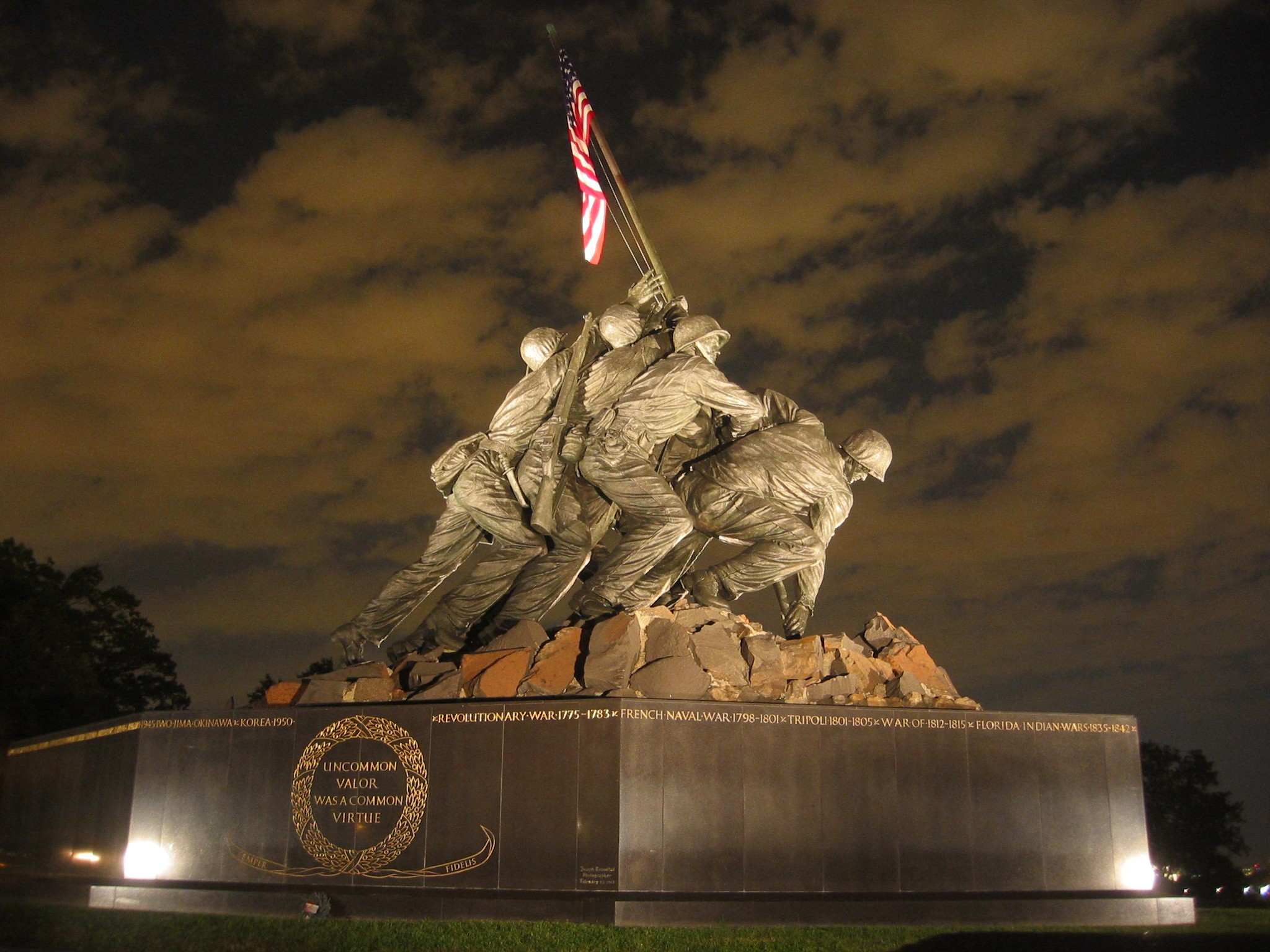
The U.S. Marine Corps War Memorial in Arlington, Virginia

The American people saw Rosenthal's photo as a potent symbol of victory. Wire services flashed what would become a Pulitzer Prize–winning photograph around the world in time to appear in the Sunday newspapers on February 25, 1945 (Lowery's photos weren't released until late 1947). Many magazines ran the photo on their covers. After the battle for Iwo Jima was over and won, the photo was used for posters in war bond drives through over 30 cities from May 11 through July 4, 1945, which raised $26.3 billion.

Rosenthal's photograph became an enduring icon. Artists used the photo as a model for the United States Marine Corps War Memorial (1954) — commonly referred to as "The Iwo Jima Memorial" — at Arlington, Virginia, and the U.S. Postal Service commemorated the photo on a U.S. postage stamp. A version of the Marine Corps memorial also stands on the parade ground at Marine Corps Recruit Depot Parris Island, South Carolina.

== Later years and death ==
In later years, when asked about the photo, he would say "I took the picture; the Marines took Iwo Jima." Rosenthal left the AP later in 1945 and became the chief photographer and manager of Times Wide World Photos. He later joined the San Francisco Chronicle. He worked there as a photographer for 35 years, before retiring in 1981. His name was inscribed (across from the memorial sculptor Felix de Weldon's name) on the bottom right side of the front (west side) of the Marine Corps War Memorial in 1982. On April 13, 1996, Rosenthal was named an honorary Marine by then Commandant of the Marine Corps General Charles C. Krulak.

On August 20, 2006, at age 94, Rosenthal died of natural causes in his sleep at a center for assisted living in Novato, California, located in the North Bay region of the San Francisco Bay Area, in northern Marin County. Rosenthal was cremated. A Marine Corps ceremony that was open to the public was held for him at the Marines' Memorial Club on September 15 and a Catholic funeral mass was held for him on September 16, 2006, at St. Emydius Catholic Church, both located in San Francisco, California.

== Awards and honors ==
- Pulitzer Prize – Rosenthal received the Pulitzer Prize in 1945 for the iconic photo. The committee noted that photo as "depicting one of the war's great moments," a "frozen flash of history."
- International Photography Hall of Fame, St. Louis, Missouri
- Navy Distinguished Public Service Award – The United States Marine Corps posthumously awarded Rosenthal the Distinguished Public Service Award (medal) on September 15, 2006:

Citation:

For exceptionally distinguished public service in support of the United States Navy and Marine Corps. On February 23, 1945, a bespectacled Mr. Rosenthal made a picture of five U.S. Marines and one U.S. Navy corpsman that immortalized the American Fighting spirit during World War II and became an everlasting symbol of service and sacrifice, transcending art and the ages. Mr. Rosenthal's poor eyesight prohibited him from serving in the armed services, so, he instead went to war summoning the craft he had practiced since the Great Depression. He bravely accompanied island-hopping forces in the Pacific as a civilian news photographer. On Iwo Jima, Japan, short of breath from climbing the 546-foot volcano, Mr. Rosenthal, in haste, stood on top of shaky rocks in search of the best graphic composition. As the six men hoisted an iron pole and the American flag unfurled in a smart breeze for all to see, Mr. Rosenthal captured the precise moment, unaware, until much later, of its significance. Since that very day, his iconic photo has stood as a testament to the perseverance, esprit and dedication of American Marines. In recognition of his own service and dedication, Mr. Rosenthal is posthumously awarded the Department of the Navy Distinguished Public Service Award. /S/ U.S. Secretary of the Navy, Donald C. Winter

== Legacy ==
The 2006 Hollywood film Flags of Our Fathers, directed by Clint Eastwood, tells the stories of the American flag raisers who raised the famous flag on Mount Suribachi and depicts Rosenthal's involvement in the events that led up to his taking the iconic flag raising photograph. Rosenthal was portrayed by actor Ned Eisenberg in the film.

Reporters extensively interviewed Rosenthal after September 11, 2001, when Thomas E. Franklin shot a similar iconic photograph, Ground Zero Spirit, depicting the raising of the flag by three firefighters at the World Trade Center. Rosenthal and Franklin met several times after the event.
