= United States Mint coin sets =

Proof coins and mint sets issued by the United States Mint

The United States Mint has released annual collections of coins most years since 1936.

== United States Mint 50 State Quarters Proof Set ==
With the launch of the 50 State Quarters Program in 1999, the Mint began marketing proof sets of just the five quarters released in the given year. These sets are essentially a reduced version of the regular issue proof sets and the packaging maintained the same blue color scheme, but came in a smaller box and different certificate of authenticity. This collection ceased with the resolution of the program in 2008. These sets are usually denoted as the 5-piece sets from a given year. All issues were produced at the San Francisco Mint.

== United States Mint 50 State Quarters Silver Proof Set ==
The 50 State Quarters Proof Sets produced with the five quarters produced that year in 90% silver and again were the same as the year's Silver Proof Set but in a reduced red packaging and unique certificate of authenticity. All issues were produced at the San Francisco Mint.

== United States Mint America the Beautiful Quarters Proof Set ==
The America the Beautiful Quarters program began in 2010 as a continuation of the 50 State Quarters and D.C. and Territories programs, allowing each state a representation in the nation's coinage. These sets are reduced versions of the United States Mint Proof Set and the packaging maintains the same burnt-orange color scheme, but came in a smaller box and different certificate of authenticity. All issues were produced at the San Francisco Mint.

== United States Mint America the Beautiful Quarters Silver Proof Set ==
The 50 State Quarters Proof Sets are also produced in 90% silver and again are the same as the year's Silver Proof Set but in a reduced navy-blue packaging and unique certificate of authenticity. All issues were produced at the San Francisco Mint.

== United States Mint District of Columbia and U.S. Territories Quarters Proof Set ==
Upon completion of the 50 State Quarters Program, it was decided to honor Washington D.C. and the U.S. Overseas Territories in a similar manner. The District of Columbia and United States Territories Quarters allowed for the minting of six designs in 2009 and these were sold as a set. All were produced at the San Francisco Mint.

== United States Mint Presidential $1 Coin Proof Set ==
With the launch of the Presidential $1 Coin Program, four dollar coins were released each year from 2007 to 2016 - each depicting a serving U.S. President. This set is the sleeve of dollar coins from regular issue mint sets on its own with reduced packaging and a different certificate of authenticity. The program ended in 2016 when all eligible presidents had been honored.

== United States Prestige Coin Set ==
First released in 1983 and continued through 1997 missing only one year (1985), Prestige Sets contain proof strikings of the regular issue coinage in addition to the commemorative dollar and half dollar from the year of release. The coins are presented in a book-like case with a special laminated enclosure of a different design than the standard proof set sleeves. This collection was marketed to give consumers a more "premium" option.

== United States Mint Proof Set ==
This collection encompasses every coin design produced by the United States Mint in a single year. This is the longest-running series of coins produced by the Mint and comprises coins prepared using proof striking methods. The Mint packages the specially prepared coins in hard plastic cases meant for long-term preservation.

All releases from 1936 to 1972 included the cent, nickel, dime, quarter, and half dollar from that year. The first proof sets through 1964 were minted at the Philadelphia Mint. There were two official releases in 1942: one regular five coin set and a set including a silver wartime nickel. United States currency was debased beginning in 1965, but the sets continued under the name United States Mint Proof Set. Production was moved to the San Francisco branch in 1968, and all subsequent issues bear coins with an "S" mint mark. In 1973, the Eisenhower dollar was added to the collection. Sets from 1975 will have a dual-date 1776-1976 quarter, half-dollar, and dollar as none of those coins were ever produced with a 1975 date. The Susan B. Anthony dollar replaced the Eisenhower in 1979. The 1981 mint sets were the only method of obtaining an Anthony dollar from that year, though many have slipped into circulation. With the cease in minting of dollar coins, the regular issue Proof Set for 1982 included a brass token. From 1983 until 1998, the annual United States Proof set resumed to only issuing the cent, nickel, dime, quarter, and half-dollar.

With the introduction of the 50 State Quarters program in 1999, the Mint began issuing all five quarters released from that year with the already established denominations, thus creating a nine-coin set split across two holders, or lenses. The single lens containing just the quarters was also sold separately. The following year, the Sacagawea dollar was included in the regular set, bringing the coin count to ten. The Westward Journey Series of nickels saw the introduction of eleven coin sets in 2004 and 2005 featuring both nickels, the cent, dime, half dollar, golden dollar and all five quarters. The regular issue returned to ten coins in 2006, but the Presidential Dollar Coin Program necessitated an expansion to three lenses with a total of fourteen coins from 2007 to 2008. In 2009, another lens was added to facilitate the one-cent coins minted for the Lincoln Bicentennial collection. The one-cent coins produced for the proof sets that year were composed of a 95% copper alloy equivalent to the Lincoln cent's original composition. This set peaked the coin count at eighteen as it also included that year's set of District of Columbia and United States Territories Quarters. The regular release returned to a count of fourteen coins across three lenses in 2010 and the individual lens of America the Beautiful Quarters or Presidential Dollar Coins sold separate.

== United States Mint Silver Proof Set ==
Beginning in 1992, the Mint began producing proof sets with the cupronickel denomination replaced by specimens struck with the pre-debasement composition: coin silver, or 90% Ag and 10% Cu. All of the quarters released in any one year of a series since 1999 are also struck in silver. Otherwise, these sets are largely similar to the standard United States Mint Proof Set, but are packaged with a red color scheme and different certificate of authenticity.

== United States Mint Uncirculated Coin Set ==
The Uncirculated Sets, or Mint Sets, contain specimens of coins that are typically minted for general circulation. The first such sets were sold in 1947 in cardboard panels with two coins for each issue, thus showing the obverse and reverse of each one. Such sets were, with the exception of 1950, annually produced through 1958. In 1959 a plastic soft pack of single coins was sold and these were annually offered through 1964. In 1965-1967 "special mint sets", a higher level of uncirculated coins, replaced both mint and proof sets. With the exception of 1982–1983, mint sets have been issued every year since 1968. (For 1982 and 1983 collectors sometimes buy the annual "souvenir sets" struck by the Philadelphia and Denver mints, which are very similar to the official Treasury-issued mint sets.)

Notable are the 1970, 1973, and 1996 mint sets. These contained the 1970-D Kennedy half dollar, the 1973-P and 1973-D Eisenhower dollars, and the 1996-W Roosevelt dime, none of which were minted for general circulation and could be obtained only from the U.S. mint sets. More recent sets contain non-circulating half-dollar and dollar denominations. From the 2005 mint set coins through the 2010 mint set coins were prepared using special dies that produce a "satin finish" distinct from business strike coins. The US Mint reverted to coins that are typically minted for general circulation in 2011. Mint sets currently are sealed in a plastic blister-pack, unlike the flexible plastic packs of earlier sets. They are usually sold in sets of two - one for each branch of production.

In 2017, the Mint released a special "Enhanced Uncirculated Mint Set", limited to a maximum mintage of 225,000 sets. The set sold out within seven minutes.
