= ATB =

ATB or atb may refer to:

== Arts and entertainment ==
- ATB (DJ) (born 1973), German DJ and music producer
- Active Time Battle, a role-playing video game mechanic
- Andy Timmons Band, a band led by guitarist Andy Timmons
- Atelier-Théâtre Burkinabé, a Burkinabè theatre group
- After the Burial, an American extreme metal band

== Companies ==
- ATB-Market, a Ukrainian network of retail shops
- AtB, the public transit company of Trøndelag County Municipality, Norway

=== Banking ===
- Amsterdam Trade Bank, a Dutch bank
- Arab Tunisian Bank, a financial institution formed partly by Arab Bank
- ATB Financial (Alberta Treasury Branches), a financial institution owned by the Alberta government

== Media ==
- Red ATB, a Bolivian television channel
  - ATB Radio, a Bolivian radio station

== Sports ==
- All terrain bike, an off-road bicycle now best known as mountain bike
- All terrain boarding, an extreme sport also known as mountain boarding
- Around the Bay Road Race, a 30 km road race held every March in Hamilton, Ontario, Canada

== Technology ==
- All trunks busy, on public switched telephone networks
- Advanced Trace Bus, a protocol in the Advanced Microcontroller Bus Architecture protocol specification

== Transportation and vehicles ==
- Articulated tug and barge, a type of tugboat
- Automatische treinbeïnvloeding, a Dutch system of automatic train protection
- Advanced Technology Bomber, the program under which the B-2 Spirit stealth bomber was developed

== Other uses ==
- Ability to benefit, in US education
- ATB Place, a plaza in Edmonton, Alberta, Canada
- Zaiwa language (ISO 639 code: atb)

== See also ==
- America the Beautiful (disambiguation)
