= American Women quarters =

Series of US coins

American Women quarter
- United States
- Value: 25 cents (0.25 US dollars)
- Mass: 5.67 g (standard); 6.34 g (silver proof) g
- Diameter: 24.26 mm (0.955 in)
- Thickness: 1.75 mm (0.069 in)
- Edge: 119 reeds
- Composition: 91.67% Cu 8.33% Ni (standard); 99.9% Ag (silver proof)
- Years of minting: 2022–2025

Obverse
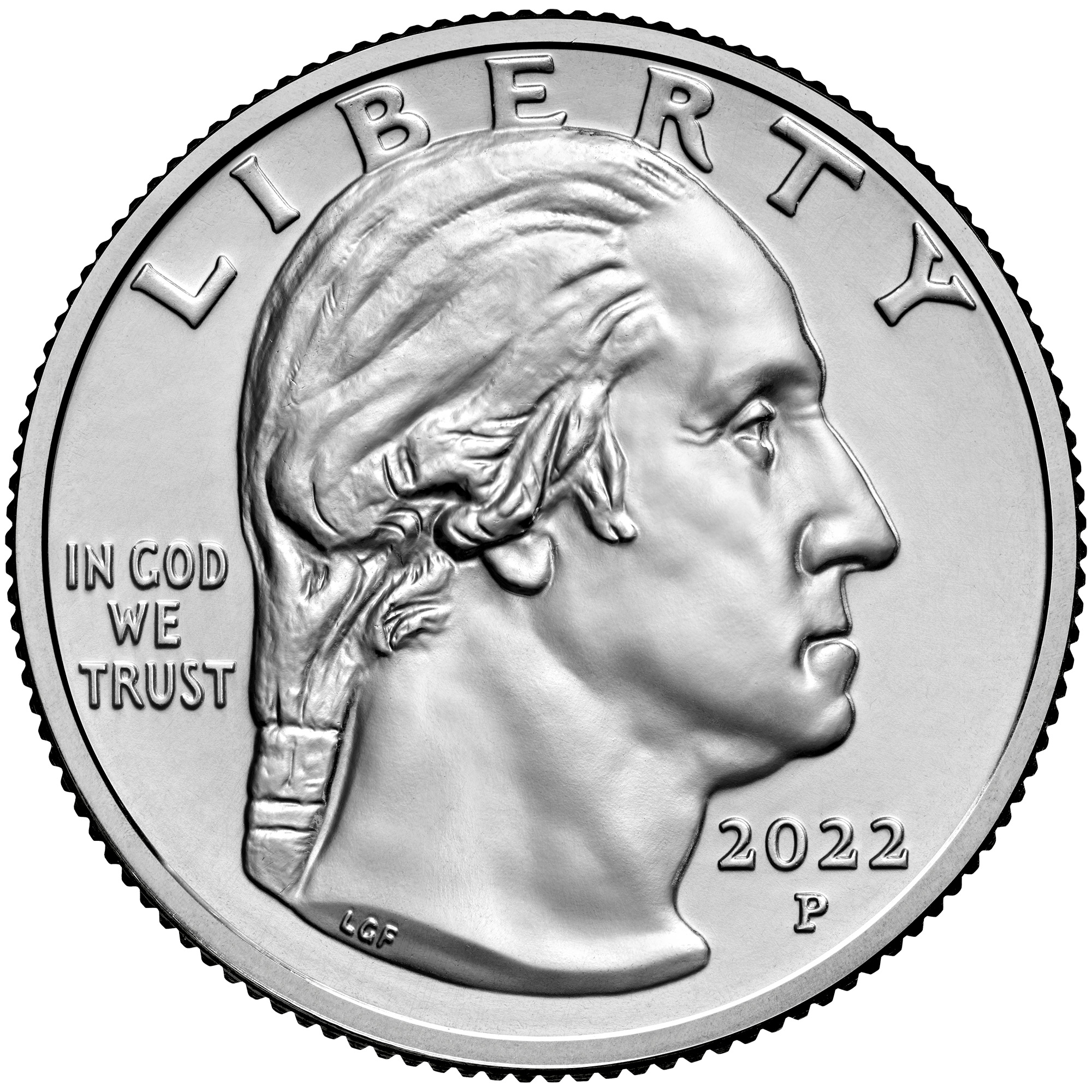
- Design: George Washington
- Designer: Laura Gardin Fraser
- Design date: 1931

Reverse
- Design: Various; up to five designs per year (inaugural design shown)
- Designer: Various

The American Women quarters program was a series of circulating commemorative quarters released by the United States Mint. Minted from 2022 through 2025, they featured designs of notable women in U.S. history, commemorating the centennial of the Nineteenth Amendment to the United States Constitution.

Five designs were issued each year for 20 total designs, with one woman honored on the reverse of each coin, selected for "contributions to the United States in a wide spectrum of accomplishments and fields, including but not limited to suffrage, civil rights, abolition, government, humanities, science, space, and arts." Most of the women featured were from ethnic minority groups. The obverse depicts George Washington, using a design by Laura Gardin Fraser originally intended for the first Washington quarter in 1932.

The program was authorized by the Circulating Collectible Coin Redesign Act of 2020, sponsored by Representatives Barbara Lee and Anthony Gonzalez. The original proposal was for 56 quarters, honoring one woman from each state and territory, but with a set of circulating coins intended to be released in 2026 for the United States Semiquincentennial, it was amended to be shorter. It replaced an alternative proposal of quarters featuring animals or endangered species.

It succeeded the America the Beautiful quarters and Washington Crossing the Delaware quarter, and will be followed in 2027–2030 with a series depicting youth sports. Some coin collectors were critical of the "seemingly unending" proposal to continue to issue five new quarter designs every year for a third decade. Many numismatists are more interested in redesigns of other denominations and less frequent releases.

== Designs ==
In addition to circulating coins, the series was also minted as a silver proof set.

=== Obverse ===
Laura Gardin Fraser's portrait of George Washington, which was originally submitted in 1931, was selected by the Commission of Fine Arts and Citizens Coinage Advisory Committee to appear on the obverse of the American Women quarters. The right-facing bust had been used for the 1999 George Washington half eagle for the 200th anniversary of Washington's death.

=== Reverse ===
The United States Secretary of the Treasury selects the women featured for the series in consultation with the Smithsonian Institution's American Women's History Initiative, the National Women's History Museum, and the Congressional Caucus for Women's Issues. Recommendations for women honorees were solicited from the public in 2021.

==== 2022 ====
Honorees featured in 2022 are:

- Maya Angelou, the first Black woman featured on U.S. currency. Designed by Emily Damstra, who said her depiction of Angelou "convey[s] the passionate way she lived". She indicated that the bird in flight that silhouetted Angelou's arms was modeled on a Purple martin, which is native to Angelou's home state of Arkansas, and symbolized her autobiography I Know Why the Caged Bird Sings. Oprah Winfrey called the design "a true treasure" and "an incredible moment" to commemorate her friend and poet's life. Because a bust portrait was not permitted, Damstra chose to limit the details in the quarter, balancing negative space.
- Sally Ride, the first LGBT person on U.S. currency. Her partner Tam O'Shaughnessy said Ride's design by the Space Shuttle's window reflected her quote, "But when I wasn't working, I was usually at a window looking down at Earth." It shows her wearing a patch with an element Ride designed for the STS-7 mission that represented her being the first American woman in space. The design was unveiled at the 2021 Space Symposium.
- Wilma Mankiller; design released at an event at the Cherokee National Capitol. Cherokee Nation Principal Chief Chuck Hoskin Jr. said, "Chief Mankiller was the voice that first elevated Native American tribes and tribal issues in this country and served as the first female Chief in a role dominated by men during a time that the Cherokee Nation was first getting its footing after decades of suppression by the U.S. Government[...] She fought for civil rights and equality, and self-sufficiency for the Cherokee people, and was the anchor establishing what has now become the largest tribal health care system in the country. We are so proud she is forever honored on this coin by the U.S. Mint."
- Adelina Otero-Warren, the first Hispanic American on U.S. currency.
- Anna May Wong, the first Asian American on U.S. currency.

==== 2023 ====
Honorees featured in 2023 are:

- Bessie Coleman; design released at an event at the Federal Aviation Administration. FAA Deputy Administrator Brad Mims said the coin "[is] a valuable symbol of an important chapter in U.S. aviation history."
- Jovita Idar; design released at an event at the University of Texas at San Antonio.
- Edith Kanakaʻole, the first native Hawaiian on U.S. currency. The design was released at an event at the University of Hawaiʻi Hilo, where Kanakaʻole previously taught. Designer Emily Damstra said, "It was a joy to become aware of Edith Kanakaʻole's legacy as I developed a design for her quarter[...] I came to understand that her deep connection to the land—her home in Hawaiʻi near the Maunakea volcano—played a large role in her life and work. To best honor the various ways she made an impact, I felt that the design should emphasize her relationship to that environment."
- Eleanor Roosevelt
- Maria Tallchief, who also appears on the 2023 Sacagawea dollar. Designer Ben Sowards said, "Although her artistry, precision, and technical skill made her one of the most renowned ballerinas of her time, it is Maria Tallchief's courage, perseverance, and strength of character that I hope are evident in the design[...] Her legacy continues to inspire us to pursue our dreams."

==== 2024 ====
Honorees featured in 2024 are:

- Pauli Murray; Murray's niece Rosita Stevens-Holsey said, "When I see my aunt's face looking out through the letters of the word 'hope', it brings to mind that she never lost hope in a society and world that needed to change to embrace the rights of all humans. Her selection as one of the honorees is validation and a testament to more than 50 years of achievements in social justice, women's rights, civil rights, and human rights."
- Patsy Takemoto Mink; the design honors Mink's work on the Title IX Amendment of the Higher Education Act, renamed the Patsy T. Mink Equal Opportunity in Education Act in 2002.
- Mary Edwards Walker; Oswego Town Historian George DeMass, who advised the U.S. Mint on the design, said of the process, "The committees were so concerned about accuracy, which I'm very glad[...] They would ask questions like, 'Do you happen to know what hairstyle she was wearing during the war?' Which, you know, was 150 years ago, but fortunately we had pictures."
- Celia Cruz, the first Afro-Latina on U.S. currency. Cruz's former manager Omer Pardillo said, "It's a significant honor to become the first Afro-Latina, who, despite her humble beginnings, managed to captivate the world with her exceptional talent and charisma[...] All Latinos should be very proud of this enormous accomplishment as Celia not only represents Cubans, but Latinos all over the world[...] She belonged to the world."
- Zitkala-Ša, a Yankton Dakota writer, editor, translator, musician, educator, and political activist.

==== 2025 ====
Honorees featured in 2025 are:

- Ida B. Wells, an investigative journalist, suffragist, educator, and civil rights leader.
- Juliette Gordon Low, founder of Girl Scouts of the United States of America
- Vera Rubin, the first Jewish person featured on US currency, an astronomer who pioneered work on galaxy rotation uncovering crucial evidence of dark matter
- Stacey Milbern, a visionary disability justice activist
- Althea Gibson, a multisport athlete and first Black athlete to break the color barrier at the highest level in tennis and professional golf

== List of designs ==
| Year | No. | Woman | Design | Elements depicted | Artist(s) | | Release date | Mintage | | | |
| Year | No. | Woman | Design | Elements depicted | Sculptor (Medallic Artist) | Designer (Artistic Infusion Program) | Release date | Denver | Philadelphia | San Francisco | Total |
|---|---|---|---|---|---|---|---|---|---|---|---|
| 2022 | 1 | Maya Angelou | | Angelou with her arms outstretched, in front of a flying bird and sunrise. | Craig Campbell | Emily Damstra | January 3, 2022 | 258,200,000 | 237,600,000 | 303,520 | 496,103,520 |
| 2022 | 2 | Dr. Sally Ride | | Ride next to a Space Shuttle window, with Earth in the background. | Phebe Hemphill | Elana Hagler | March 22, 2022 | 278,000,000 | 275,200,000 | 304,120 | 553,504,120 |
| 2022 | 3 | Wilma Mankiller | | Mankiller wearing a shawl, by a seven-pointed Cherokee Nation star and ᏣᎳᎩᎯ ᎠᏰᎵ ("Cherokee Nation" in Cherokee syllabary). | Phebe Hemphill | Benjamin Sowards | June 6, 2022 | 296,800,000 | 310,000,000 | 304,640 | 607,104,640 |
| 2022 | 4 | Nina Otero-Warren | | Otero-Warren with three Yucca flowers and the Spanish inscription Voto para la mujer (Vote for Women). | Craig Campbell | Chris Costello | August 15, 2022 | 219,200,000 | 225,000,000 | 305,560 | 444,505,560 |
| 2022 | 5 | Anna May Wong | | Wong surrounded by marquee lights. | John P. McGraw | Emily Damstra | October 25, 2022 | 240,800,000 | 226,800,000 | 303,680 | 467,903,680 |
| 2023 | 6 | Bessie Coleman | | Coleman in leather flying helmet looking into the clouds toward a flying biplane. The inscription "6.15.1921" is the date she received her international pilot's license. | Eric David Custer | Chris Costello | January 3, 2023 | 317,200,000 | 302,000,000 | 500,360 | 619,700,360 |
| 2023 | 7 | Edith Kanakaʻole | | Kanakaʻole, with her hair and lei poʻo (head lei) blending into a Hawaiian landscape. The inscription "E hō mai ka ʻike" translates to "granting the wisdom" and refers to the role of hula and chants in cultural preservation. This design features the denomination shown as "25¢" instead of "Quarter Dollar" used on all other previous designs. | Renata Gordon | Emily Damstra | March 27, 2023 | 368,600,000 | 372,800,000 | 503,400 | 741,903,400 |
| 2023 | 8 | Eleanor Roosevelt | | Roosevelt stands by the scales of justice in front of a representation of the globe, above the inscription "Universal Declaration of Human Rights". | Craig Campbell | Don Everhart | June 5, 2023 | 271,800,000 | 284,000,000 | 507,120 | 556,307,120 |
| 2023 | 9 | Jovita Idar | | Idar standing with her hands clasped. Her body is made up of inscriptions representing her accomplishments and the newspapers for which she wrote. | John P. McGraw | | August 14, 2023 | 184,800,000 | 190,600,000 | 503,920 | 375,903,920 |
| 2023 | 10 | Maria Tallchief | | Maria Tallchief spotlit in balletic pose. Her Osage name, 𐓏𐓘𐓸𐓮𐓟-𐓍𐓪͘𐓬𐓘, which translates to "Two Standards", is written in the Osage script. | Joseph Menna | Benjamin Sowards | October 23, 2023 | 184,800,000 | 185,800,000 | 502,560 | 371,102,560 |
| 2024 | 11 | Dr. Pauli Murray | | Portrait of Rev. Dr. Murray inside the word "HOPE," with the quotation "A song in a weary throat," from her poem "Dark Testament." | Joseph Menna | Emily Damstra | February 1, 2024 | 185,500,000 | 168,400,000 | 506,360 | 354,406,360 |
| 2024 | 12 | Patsy Mink | | Mink standing outside the Capitol holding a copy of Title IX and wearing a lei, with legend "Equal Opportunity in Education" | John P. McGraw | Beth Zaiken | March 25, 2024 | 187,200,000 | 210,200,000 | 471,720 | 397,871,720 |
| 2024 | 13 | Dr. Mary Edwards Walker | | Dr. Walker wearing her Medal of Honor. | Phebe Hemphill | | June 3, 2024 | 159,400,000 | 141,200,000 | 449,240 | 301,049,240 |
| 2024 | 14 | Celia Cruz | | Cruz performing with a microphone, with her catchphrase "¡AZÚCAR!" ("SUGAR!") | Phebe Hemphill | | August 12, 2024 | 156,200,000 | 149,600,000 | 557,160 | 306,357,160 |
| 2024 | 15 | Zitkala-Ša | | Zitkala-Ša in traditional Yankton Sioux dress and holding a book. A stylized sun represents her Sun Dance Opera, while a red cardinal symbolizes her name, which means "Red Bird." A Yankton Sioux-inspired diamond pattern sits underneath the sun. | Renata Gordon | Don Everhart | October 21, 2024 | 170,200,000 | 152,600,000 | 430,280 | 323,230,280 |
| 2025 | 16 | Ida B. Wells | | On the bottom, Ida B. Wells' most notable occupations ("Journalist", "Suffragist", and "Civil Rights Activist") are listed. | Phebe Hemphill | Elana Hagier | February 4, 2025 | 143,200,000 | 166,200,000 | 391,280 | 309,791,280 |
| 2025 | 17 | Juliette Gordon Low | | Juliette Gordon Low next to the original Girl Scout trefoil, which she designed and patented. | Eric David Custer | Thomas Hipschen | March 24, 2025 | 130,200,000 | 200,400,000 | 434,600 | 331,034,600 |
| 2025 | 18 | Dr. Vera Rubin | | Profile of Dr. Vera Rubin with dark matter background. | John P. McGraw | Christina Hess | June 3, 2025 | 63,000,000 | 55,800,000 | 383,480 | 119,183,480 |
| 2025 | 19 | Stacey Milbern | | Stacey Milbern in a wheelchair; below her name is the legend "Disability Justice". | Craig Campbell | Elena Hagler | August 12, 2025 | 59,400,000 | 94,800,000 | 361,360 | 154,561,360 |
| 2025 | 20 | Althea Gibson | | Althea Gibson holding a tennis racket and surrounded by the legend "Trailblazing Champion". | Renata Gordon | Don Everhart | October 21, 2025 | 31,600,000 | 35,200,000 | 326,560 | 67,126,560 |

== See also ==
- 50 State quarters
- America the Beautiful quarters
- District of Columbia and United States Territories quarters
- Susan B. Anthony dollar
- Sacagawea dollar
- Presidential dollar coins
- American Innovation dollars
- Kennedy Half Dollar
- Roosevelt Dime
- Westward Journey nickel series
- United States Bicentennial coinage

| Preceded by America the Beautiful quarters | American Women quarters (2022–2025) | Succeeded by United States Semiquincentennial coinage |
