= America the Beautiful (disambiguation) =

"America the Beautiful" is an American patriotic song.

America the Beautiful may also refer to:

== Film and television ==
- America the Beautiful (2007 film), an American documentary film
- America the Beautiful (Disney film), created using 360 film techniques and 360-degree cameras
- "America the Beautiful" (Duckman), a 1995 episode of Duckman
- "America the Beautiful" (Outlander), a 2018 episode of Outlander
- America the Beautiful (TV series), a 2022 American television documentary series

== Other uses ==
- America the Beautiful Pass, a series of passes to protected areas in the US
- America the Beautiful quarters, a series of 25-cent pieces issued by the US Mint
