= Theatre of Burkina Faso =

Theatre of Burkina Faso (formerly the Republic of Upper Volta) combines traditional Burkinabé performance with the colonial influences and post-colonial efforts to educate rural people to produce a distinctive national theatre. Traditional ritual ceremonies of the many ethnic groups in Burkina Faso have long involved dancing with masks. Western-style theatre became common during colonial times, heavily influenced by French theatre. With independence came a new style of theatre inspired by forum theatre aimed at educating and entertaining Burkina Faso's rural people.

== Traditional theatre ==
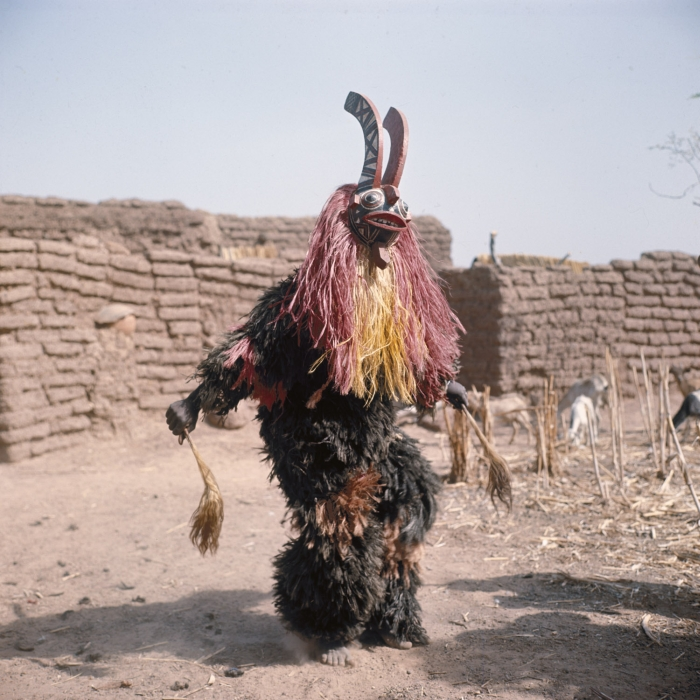
A Winiama masked dancer.

Prior to colonialism, the daily lives of each of Burkina Faso's different ethnic groups were infused with performative rituals. These rituals varied but often involved dance and the use of masks. For example, the Bwa and the Nuna people use tribal masks to represent the faces of spirits in dances on market days, at funerals and at initiation ceremonies, in order to better communicate with the protective spirits. The Dagari people, during funeral ceremonies, perform before the corpse, re-enacting important moments from his or her life. These practices, primarily of a religious nature, are gradually dying out but they still exert a significant influence on modern Burkinabè theatre.

== Theatre under French rule ==
French Upper Volta, a colony of French West Africa, was established on 1 March 1919. It became the Republic of Upper Volta in 1958, and gained independence from France in 1960. During colonial times, there was no real emergence of a national theatre, with Burkinabè troupes mingling with those of the rest of Francophone West Africa. In the 1930s and 1940s, Burkinabè students studied at the William Ponty Normal School in Dakar, Senegal, and were greatly influenced by contemporary Western theatre.

In the 1950s, following the appointment of Bernard Cornut-Gentil as High Commissioner of French West Africa, it was decided to develop cultural centres in the major cities of the federation, and to begin holding competitive drama festivals. In 1955 and 1957 the Banfora Cultural Centre Troupe gained notice for its performances in these West African drama competitions. Influenced by France, Western-style theatre became common in West Africa. Even the Christian church, previously reluctant to associate with theatre due to its animist roots, began to form troupes of its own to spread the liturgy.

== Post-independence ==
From 1971, the professional theatre of Burkina Faso emerged when the government created a Directorate of Culture to oversee the management of cultural affairs. They organised an annual cultural festival called the "semaines de la jeunesse" (or "youth week"). This festival was responsible for developing rural theatre in the country. Since 1983, the youth week has been replaced with the biennial National Culture Week of Burkina Faso which alternates with the FESPACO film festival.

The need to educate people in rural areas lead to the creation of "social theatre". In 1978, Prosper Kampaoré founded the Atelier-Théâtre Burkinabè (ATB), a theatre group made up of volunteer actors who use their performances to educate the people of Burkina Faso. The ATB was partly inspired by the forum theatre of Brazilian director Augusto Boal. In 1989, Burkina Faso hosted the Franco-Forum Theatre conference.

In the 1990s, the theatre industry benefited from the establishment of two educational institutions. In 1990, playwright Jean-Pierre Guingané founded the UNEDO (Union des ensembles dramatiques de Ouagadougou) stage school, for the training of stage actors. In 1999, Prosper Kampaoré opened a theatrical training centre for people developing theatre projects.
