= Presidential dollar coins =

Series of circulating commemorative dollar coins

- United States
- Value: $1 U.S. dollar
- Mass: 8.100 g (0.26 troy oz)
- Diameter: 26.49 mm (1.043 in)
- Thickness: 2.00 mm (0.0787 in)
- Edge: Engraved: text "E pluribus unum", the coin's mint mark, its year of issuance, and 13 five-pointed stars (prior to 2009: text "In God We Trust")
- Composition: Core: 100% Cu; Cladding: 77% Cu, 12% Zn, 7% Mn, 4% Ni; Overall: 88.5% Cu, 6% Zn, 3.5% Mn, 2% Ni
- Years of minting: 2007–2011 (circulation); 2012–2016; 2020 (collectors only)
- Catalog number: —

Obverse
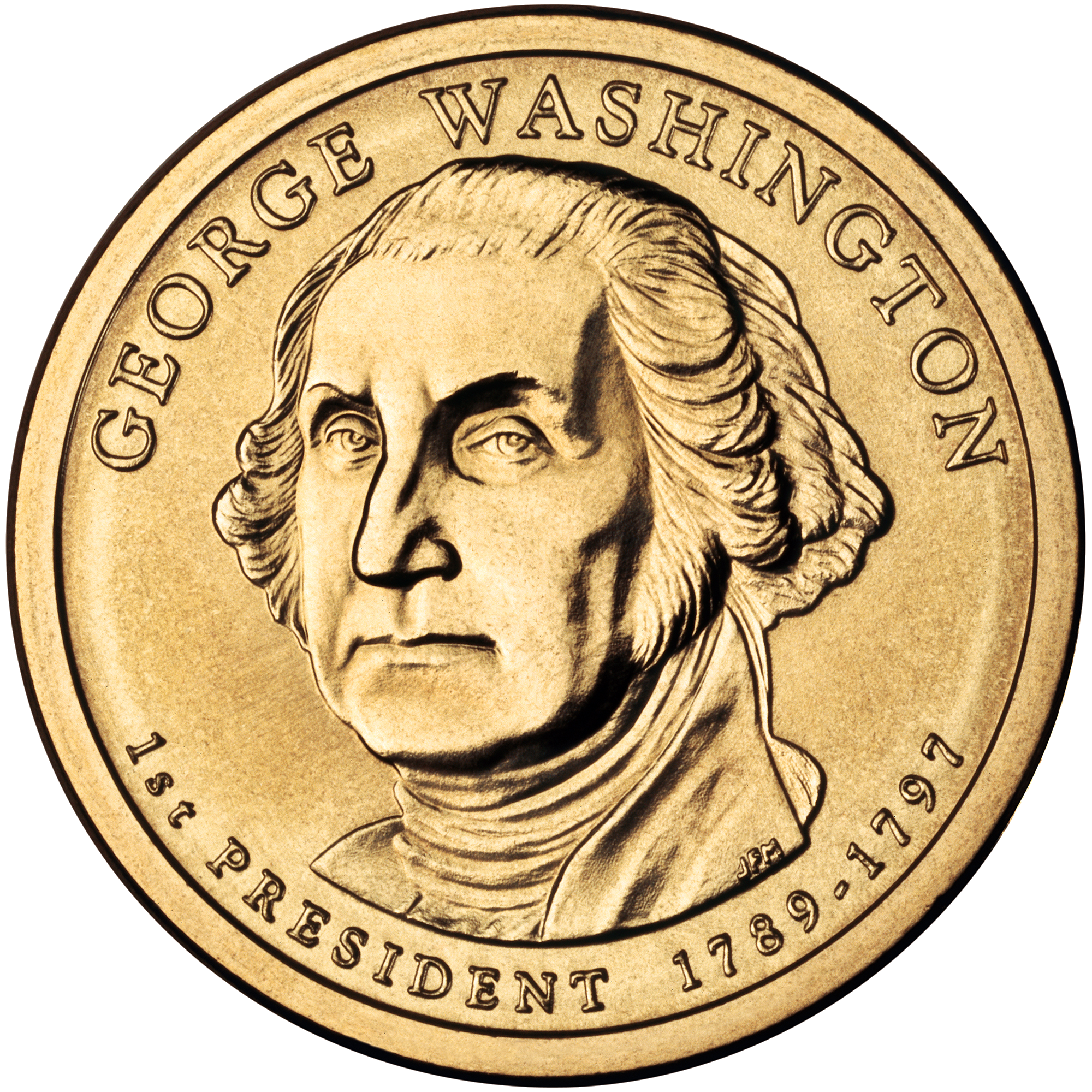
- Design: Portrait of US presidents (first shown)
- Designer: Various
- Design date: 2007–2016; 2020

Reverse
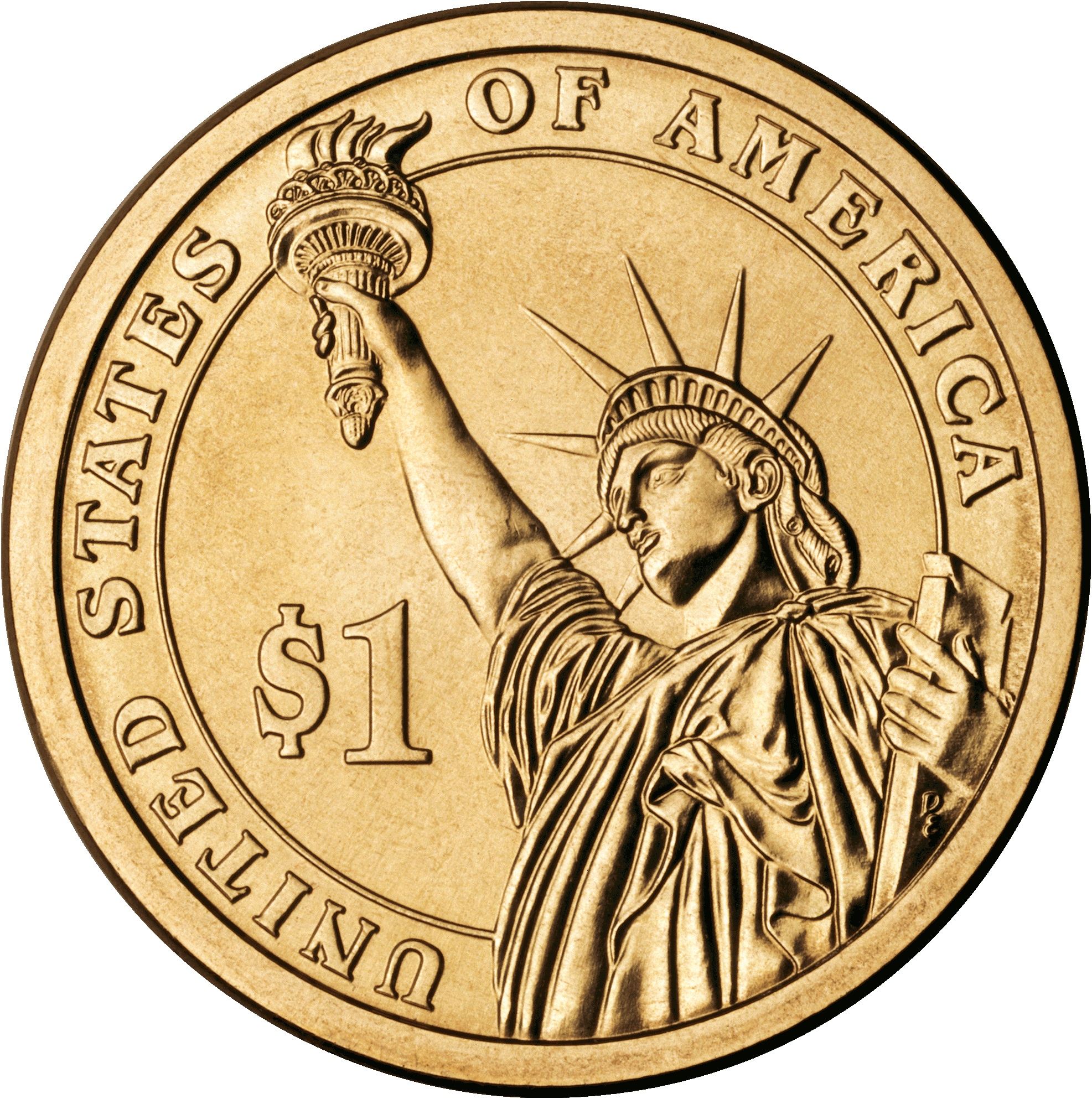
- Design: Statue of Liberty
- Designer: Don Everhart
- Design date: 2007

Presidential $1 Coin Act of 2005
Great Seal of the United States
- Long title: An Act to require the Secretary of the Treasury to mint coins in commemoration of each of the Presidents of the United States, and for other purposes.
- Nicknames: Presidential $1 Coin Act

Citations
- Public law: Pub. L. 109–145
- Stat.: 119 Stat. 2664
- Codification: 31 U.S.C. § 5112

Legislative History
- Introduced by: Michael Castle (R-DE)
- Introduced on: May 17, 2005
- Passed House: April 27, 2005 (Voice vote)
- Passed Senate: November 18, 2005 (Unanimous consent)
- Signed into law: December 22, 2005 by President George W. Bush

Presidential dollar coins (authorized by Pub. L. 109–145 (text) (PDF), 119 Stat. 2664, enacted December 22, 2005) are a series of United States dollar coins with engravings of relief portraits of U.S. presidents on the obverse and the Statue of Liberty (Liberty Enlightening the World) on the reverse.

From 2007 to 2011, presidential dollar coins were minted for circulation in large numbers, resulting in an ample stockpile of unused $1 coins. From 2012 to 2016, new coins in the series were minted only for collectors. A new coin was released on December 4, 2020, to honor George H. W. Bush, who died after the original program ended.

== Legislative history ==
S. 1047, the Presidential $1 Coin Act of 2005, was introduced on May 17, 2005, by Senator John E. Sununu with over 70 cosponsors. It was reported favorably out of the U.S. Senate Committee on Banking, Housing, and Urban Affairs without amendment on July 29, 2005. The Senate passed it with a technical amendment (S.Amdt. 2676), by unanimous consent on November 18, 2005. The House of Representatives passed it (291–113) on December 13, 2005 (a similar bill, H.R. 902, had previously passed in the House, but it was the Senate bill which was passed by both chambers). The enrolled bill was presented to president George W. Bush on December 15, 2005, and he signed it into law on December 22, 2005.

== Program details ==
The program began on January 1, 2007, and, like the 50 State quarters program, was not scheduled to end until every eligible subject was honored. The program was to issue coins featuring each of four presidents per year on the obverse, issuing one for three months before moving on to the next president in chronological order by term in office. To be eligible, a president must have been deceased for at least two years prior to the time of minting. The United States Mint called it the Presidential $1 Coin Program.

The reverse of the coins bears the Statue of Liberty (formally Liberty Enlightening the World), the inscription "$1" and the inscription "United States of America" in all caps, in the font ITC Benguiat. Inscribed along the edge of the coin is the year of minting or issuance of the coin, the mint mark, 13 stars, and also the legend E Pluribus Unum in the following arrangement: ★★★★★★★★★★ (mint year) (mint mark) ★★★ E PLURIBUS UNUM; before 2009, the national motto "In God We Trust" was also part of the edge lettering. The word "Liberty" is absent from the coin altogether, since the decision was made that the image of the Statue of Liberty on the reverse of the coin was sufficient to convey the message of liberty. The text of the act does not specify the color of the coins, but per the U.S. Mint "the specifications will be identical to those used for the current Golden dollar". The George Washington $1 coin was scheduled to be first available to the public on February 15, 2007, in honor of Washington's Birthday, which was observed on February 19, but actually became available on February 7 or earlier, after some banks in twelve states released the coins to the public more than a week ahead of the official launch date. Banks and other financial institutions had been permitted to begin placing orders for the coins on February 1, 2007.

This marked the first time since the St. Gaudens Double Eagle (1907–1933) that the United States had issued a coin with edge lettering for circulation. Edge-lettered coins date back to the 1790s. The process was started to discourage the shaving of gold coin edges, a practice which was used to cheat payees. In December 2007, Congress passed H.R. 2764, moving "In God We Trust" to either the obverse or reverse of the coins. This is the same bill that created a program that included quarters for Washington, D.C., Puerto Rico, Northern Mariana Islands, Guam, the U.S. Virgin Islands, and American Samoa.

The act had been introduced because of the failure of the Sacagawea $1 coin to gain widespread circulation in the United States. The act sympathized with the need of the nation's private sector for a $1 coin, and expected that the appeal of changing the design would increase the public demand for new coins, as the public generally responded well to the state quarter program. The program was also intended to help educate the public about the nation's presidents and their history. In case the coins did not catch on with the general public, then the mint leaders hoped that collectors would be as interested in the dollars as they were with the state quarters, which generated about $6.3 billion in seigniorage (i.e., the difference between the face value of the coins and the cost to produce them) between January 1999 and December 2008.

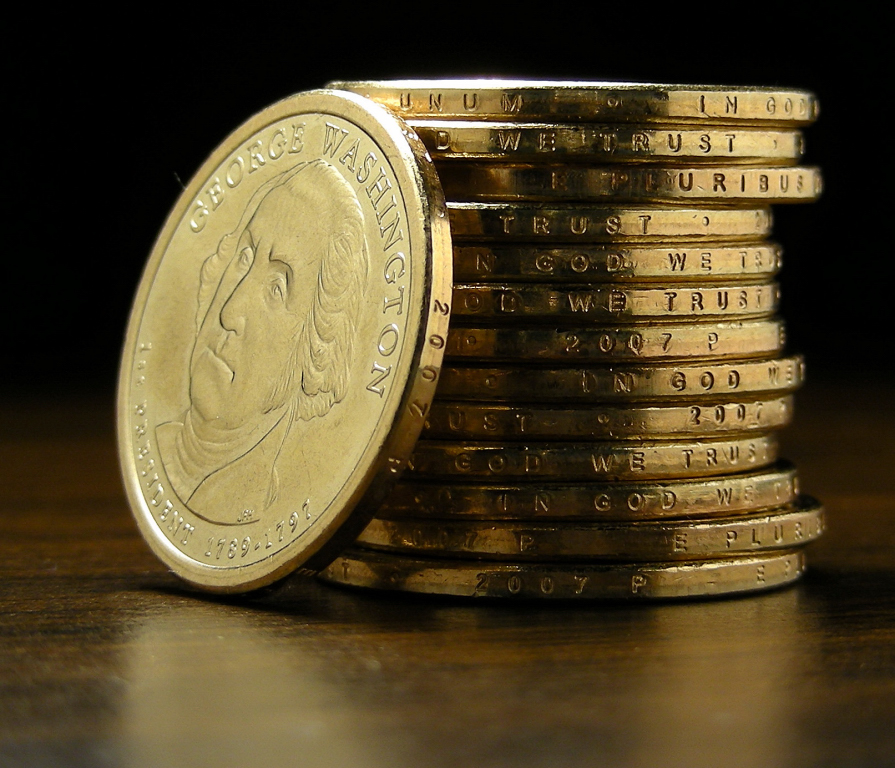
Stack showing edge lettering

Unlike the state quarter program and the Westward Journey nickel series, which suspended the issuance of the current design during those programs, the act directed the Mint to continue to issue Sacagawea dollar coins during the presidential series. The law states that at least one in three issued dollars must be a Sacagawea dollar. Furthermore, the Sacagawea design was required to continue after the presidential coin program ended. These requirements were added at the behest of the North Dakota congressional delegation to ensure that Sacagawea, whom North Dakotans consider to be one of their own, ultimately remains on the dollar coin.

However, Federal Reserve officials indicated to Congress that "if the Presidential $1 Coin Program does not stimulate substantial transactional demand for dollar coins, the requirement that the Mint nonetheless produce Sacagawea dollars would result in costs to the taxpayer without any offsetting benefits." In that event, the Federal Reserve indicated that it would "strongly recommend that Congress reassess the one-third requirement." The one-third requirement was later changed to one-fifth by the Native American $1 Coin Act, passed on September 20, 2007.

Previous versions of the act called for removing from circulation dollar coins issued before the Sacagawea dollar, most notably the Susan B. Anthony dollar, but the version of the act which became law merely directs the Secretary of the Treasury to study the matter and report back to Congress. The act required federal government agencies (including the United States Postal Service), businesses operating on federal property, and federally funded transit systems to accept and dispense dollar coins by January 2008, and to post signs indicating that they do so.

=== Production ===
The composition continued that of the Sacagawea dollar: a cladding of manganese brass (containing about 77% copper, 12% zinc, 7% manganese, and 4% nickel) over a pure copper core. This composition was chosen because it would give the coin a distinctive golden color, and would also be electromagnetically identical to its predecessor, the cupronickel Susan B. Anthony dollar, for coin acceptors.

=== Minting errors ===
On March 8, 2007, the United States Mint announced, that on February 15, 2007, an unknown number of George Washington presidential $1 coins were released into circulation without their edge inscriptions (the U.S. mottos, "In God We Trust" and "E pluribus unum", the coin's mint mark, and its year of issuance; i.e. E PLURIBUS UNUM • IN GOD WE TRUST • 2007 X (where X is either P or D)). Ron Guth, of the Professional Coin Grading Service, estimated at least 50,000 coins were released without the edge inscriptions. The first such coin discovered was sold on eBay for $600, while later coins were selling for $40–60, as of late March 2007. Because one of the inscriptions missing from the coins is the motto "In God we trust", some articles on the subject have referred to them as "godless dollars". Fake versions have also been produced with the edge lettering filed off.

Also, John Adams presidential dollars have been discovered with plain edges. They are fewer in quantity than George Washington plain-edge dollars, making them rarer, thus more expensive. A more frequently encountered edge lettering error for the John Adams dollar is a coin with doubled edge lettering. This error occurs when a coin passes through the edge lettering machine twice. Most examples of the doubled-edge-letter John Adams dollar are from the Philadelphia Mint; Denver Mint issues are comparatively scarce. They are seen in two varieties: 1) with both edge lettering inscriptions reading in the same direction, called "overlapped", and 2) with the two inscriptions running in opposite directions—i.e., inverted or upside-down relative to one another—called "inverted".

In early March 2007, a Colorado couple found a dollar coin which had not been struck with a die pair (missing the portrait of the president and the Statue of Liberty), but with edge lettering on the otherwise-blank planchet.

Some of the coins have the words on the rim struck upside down (president face up). These are not minting errors, but rather a variation created by the minting process. Such upside-down coins have been sold on auction websites like eBay and Amazon for greater than their face value, though they represent roughly 50% of the minted population.

=== Stockpile and suspension of production ===
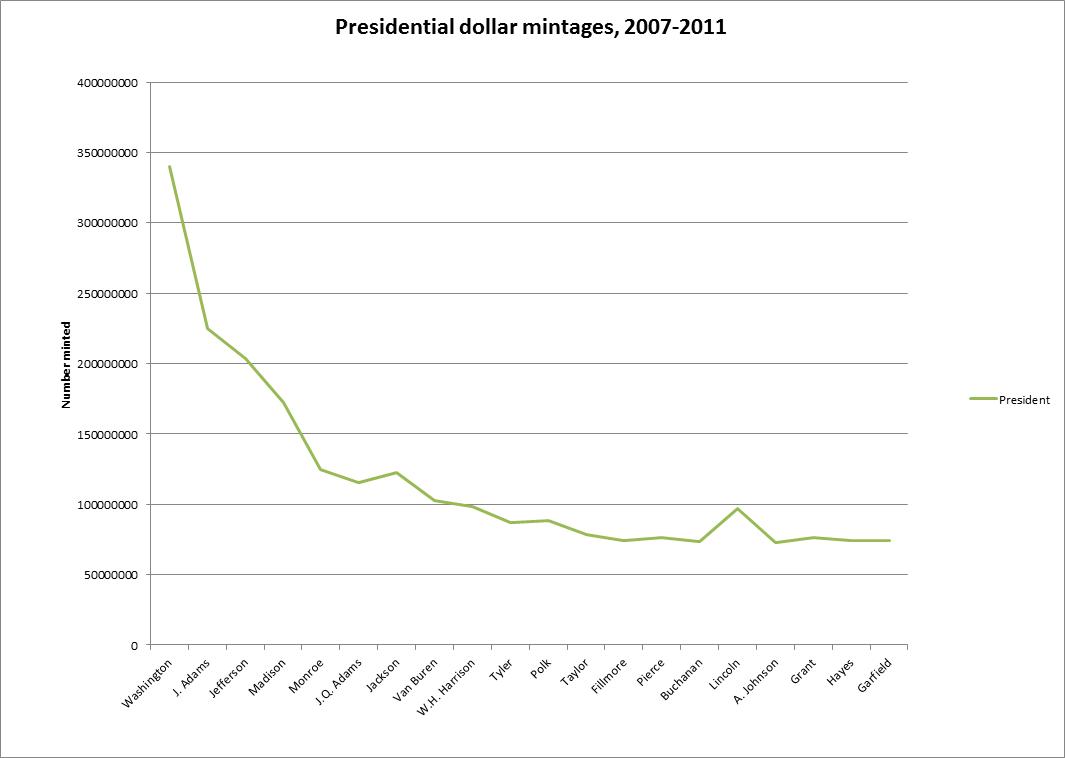
A graph showing mintages of issues minted from 2007 to 2011

By 2011, 1.4 billion uncirculated $1 coins were stockpiled, which, if laid flat, could reach from Los Angeles to Chicago. By 2016, this number might have reached two billion if the minting had continued unchanged.

Rep. Jackie Speier of California circulated a "Dear Colleague" letter recommending that the U.S. not produce any dollar coins. She was planning to introduce legislation calling for the immediate halting of all dollar coin programs.

The United States Government Accountability Office has stated that discontinuing the dollar bill in favor of the dollar coin would save the U.S. government about $5.5 billion over 30 years.

On December 13, 2011, Vice President Joe Biden and Treasury Secretary Timothy Geithner announced that the minting of presidential $1 coins for circulation would be suspended. Future entries in the program, beginning with those of Chester A. Arthur, would be issued in reduced quantities, only for collectors.

By the end of 2022, the stockpile of $1 coins was reduced to 888 million. The inventory was estimated to last for nearly 16 more years (i.e. until 2038).

=== The program's end and continuation ===
The act specifies that for a former president to be honored, they must have been deceased for at least two years before issue. Hence, former presidents George H. W. Bush, Jimmy Carter, Bill Clinton, George W. Bush, and then-current president Barack Obama were ineligible to have a dollar coin issued in their honor when the series ended in 2016, after honoring Ronald Reagan, the last president who was eligible.

Since the program has terminated, producing coins for those presidents not yet honored would require another Act of Congress. On February 12, 2019, Senator John Cornyn introduced a bill to authorize a presidential dollar honoring George H. W. Bush and an accompanying first spouse gold coin for Barbara Bush, which was signed into law by President Donald Trump on January 28, 2020. On February 19, 2025, Senator Catherine Cortez Masto introduced a bill, following the death of former president Jimmy Carter almost two months earlier, seeking to extend the program to issue the coins of deceased presidents not yet honored.

== Collecting ==
Despite not seeing widespread use in circulation, the series has seen a few lower-mintage issues, mostly in specially marketed sets. Reverse proof issues were made for the coins depicting Harry S. Truman, Dwight D. Eisenhower, John F. Kennedy, Lyndon B. Johnson, Ronald Reagan and George H. W. Bush from 2015 to 2020. These issues had mintages between 16,000 and 48,000, depending on the issue.

== Coin details ==
Dollar coins were issued bearing the likenesses of presidents, as follows:

| Release number | President number | President name | Release date | Denver Mintage | Philadelphia Mintage | Total mintage | Design | In office |
|---|---|---|---|---|---|---|---|---|
| 1 | 1st | George Washington | February 15, 2007 | 163,680,000 | 176,680,000 | 340,360,000 | Washington dollar | 1789–1797 |
| 2 | 2nd | John Adams | May 17, 2007 | 112,140,000 | 112,420,000 | 224,560,000 | | 1797–1801 |
| 3 | 3rd | Thomas Jefferson | August 16, 2007 | 102,810,000 | 100,800,000 | 203,610,000 | Jefferson dollar | 1801–1809 |
| 4 | 4th | James Madison | November 15, 2007 | 87,780,000 | 84,560,000 | 172,340,000 | | 1809–1817 |
| 5 | 5th | James Monroe | February 14, 2008 | 60,230,000 | 64,260,000 | 124,490,000 | Monroe dollar | 1817–1825 |
| 6 | 6th | John Quincy Adams | May 15, 2008 | 57,720,000 | 57,540,000 | 115,260,000 | John Quincy Adams dollar | 1825–1829 |
| 7 | 7th | Andrew Jackson | August 14, 2008 | 61,070,000 | 61,180,000 | 122,250,000 | | 1829–1837 |
| 8 | 8th | Martin Van Buren | November 13, 2008 | 50,960,000 | 51,520,000 | 102,480,000 | | 1837–1841 |
| 9 | 9th | William Henry Harrison | February 19, 2009 | 55,160,000 | 43,260,000 | 98,420,000 | William Henry Harrison dollar | 1841 |
| 10 | 10th | John Tyler | May 21, 2009 | 43,540,000 | 43,540,000 | 87,080,000 | Tyler dollar | 1841–1845 |
| 11 | 11th | James K. Polk | August 20, 2009 | 41,720,000 | 46,620,000 | 88,340,000 | | 1845–1849 |
| 12 | 12th | Zachary Taylor | November 19, 2009 | 36,680,000 | 41,580,000 | 78,260,000 | Taylor dollar | 1849–1850 |
| 13 | 13th | Millard Fillmore | February 18, 2010 | 36,960,000 | 37,520,000 | 74,480,000 | Fillmore dollar | 1850–1853 |
| 14 | 14th | Franklin Pierce | May 20, 2010 | 38,360,000 | 38,220,000 | 76,580,000 | | 1853–1857 |
| 15 | 15th | James Buchanan | August 19, 2010 | 36,540,000 | 36,820,000 | 73,360,000 | Buchanan dollar | 1857–1861 |
| 16 | 16th | Abraham Lincoln | November 18, 2010 | 48,020,000 | 49,000,000 | 97,020,000 | Lincoln dollar | 1861–1865 |
| 17 | 17th | Andrew Johnson | February 17, 2011 | 37,100,000 | 35,560,000 | 72,660,000 | A. Johnson dollar | 1865–1869 |
| 18 | 18th | Ulysses S. Grant | May 19, 2011 | 37,940,000 | 38,080,000 | 76,020,000 | Grant dollar | 1869–1877 |
| 19 | 19th | Rutherford B. Hayes | August 18, 2011 | 36,820,000 | 37,660,000 | 74,480,000 | Hayes dollar | 1877–1881 |
| 20 | 20th | James A. Garfield | November 17, 2011 | 37,100,000 | 37,100,000 | 74,200,000 | Garfield dollar | 1881 |
| 21 | 21st | Chester A. Arthur | February 5, 2012 | 4,060,000 | 6,020,000 | 10,080,000 | Arthur dollar | 1881–1885 |
| 22 | 22nd | Grover Cleveland | May 25, 2012 | 4,060,000 | 5,460,000 | 9,520,000 | Cleveland 1st Term dollar | 1885–1889 |
| 23 | 23rd | Benjamin Harrison | August 16, 2012 | 4,200,000 | 5,640,001 | 9,840,001 | Benjamin Harrison dollar | 1889–1893 |
| 24 | 24th | Grover Cleveland | November 15, 2012 | 3,920,000 | 10,680,001 | 14,600,001 | Cleveland 2nd Term dollar | 1893–1897 |
| 25 | 25th | William McKinley | February 19, 2013 | 3,365,100 | 4,760,000 | 8,125,100 | McKinley dollar | 1897–1901 |
| 26 | 26th | Theodore Roosevelt | April 11, 2013 | 3,920,000 | 5,310,700 | 9,230,700 | Theodore Roosevelt dollar | 1901–1909 |
| 27 | 27th | William Howard Taft | July 9, 2013 | 3,360,000 | 4,760,000 | 8,120,000 | | 1909–1913 |
| 28 | 28th | Woodrow Wilson | October 17, 2013 | 3,360,000 | 4,620,000 | 7,980,000 | Woodrow Wilson dollar | 1913–1921 |
| 29 | 29th | Warren G. Harding | February 6, 2014 | 3,780,000 | 6,160,000 | 9,940,000 | Warren Harding dollar | 1921–1923 |
| 30 | 30th | Calvin Coolidge | April 10, 2014 | 3,780,000 | 4,480,000 | 8,260,000 | Calvin Coolidge dollar | 1923–1929 |
| 31 | 31st | Herbert Hoover | June 19, 2014 | 3,780,000 | 4,480,000 | 8,260,000 | Herbert Hoover dollar | 1929–1933 |
| 32 | 32nd | Franklin D. Roosevelt | August 28, 2014 | 3,920,000 | 4,760,000 | 8,680,000 | Franklin Roosevelt dollar | 1933–1945 |
| 33 | 33rd | Harry S. Truman | February 5, 2015 | 3,500,000 | 4,900,000 | 8,400,000 | Harry S. Truman dollar | 1945–1953 |
| 34 | 34th | Dwight D. Eisenhower | April 13, 2015 | 3,645,998 | 4,900,000 | 8,545,998 | Eisenhower Presidential dollar | 1953–1961 |
| 35 | 35th | John F. Kennedy | June 18, 2015 | 5,180,000 | 6,160,000 | 11,340,000 | Kennedy Presidential dollar | 1961–1963 |
| 36 | 36th | Lyndon B. Johnson | August 18, 2015 | 4,200,000 | 7,840,000 | 12,040,000 | L. Johnson dollar | 1963–1969 |
| 37 | 37th | Richard Nixon | February 3, 2016 | 4,340,000 | 5,460,000 | 10,000,000 | Nixon dollar | 1969–1974 |
| 38 | 38th | Gerald Ford | March 8, 2016 | 5,040,000 | 5,460,000 | 10,500,000 | Ford dollar | 1974–1977 |
| 39 | 40th | Ronald Reagan | July 5, 2016 | 5,880,000 | 7,140,000 | 13,020,000 | | 1981–1989 |
| 40 | 41st | George H. W. Bush | December 4, 2020 | 1,502,425 | 1,242,275 | 2,744,700 | | 1989–1993 |

== First spouse program ==
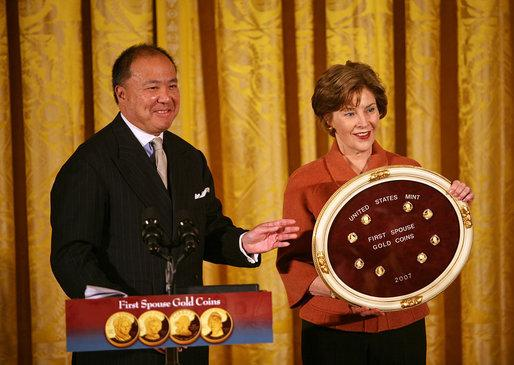
Director of United States Mint Edmund C. Moy and First Lady Laura Bush at the unveiling of Dolley Madison's first spouse coin on November 19, 2007

The United States has honored the spouses of each of the presidents honored by the Presidential $1 Coin Act by issuing half-ounce $10 gold coins featuring their images, in the order they served as first spouse, beginning in 2007. All first spouses have been women (often called first ladies).

The obverse of these coins feature portraits of the nation's first spouses, their names, the dates and order of their terms as first spouse, as well as the year of minting or issuance, and the words "In God We Trust" and "Liberty". The United States Mint issued the first spouse gold coins on the same schedule as the presidential $1 coins issued honoring the presidents. Each coin has a unique reverse design featuring an image emblematic of that spouse's life and work, as well as the words "The United States of America", "E Pluribus Unum", "$10", "1/2 oz.", and ".9999 fine gold".

When a president served unmarried, as four presidents did, a gold coin was issued bearing an obverse image emblematic of Liberty as depicted on a circulating coin of that era, and bearing a reverse image emblematic of themes of that president. One exception is the coin depicting suffragist Alice Paul which represents the era of the Chester A. Arthur presidency, as Arthur was a widower.

The act, as written, explicitly states that the first spouse coins are to be released at the same time as their respective $1 presidential coins. Because the act links a first spouse's eligibility for a coin to that of the presidential spouse, it means that a living first spouse could have appeared on a coin; this did not happen, though Nancy Reagan died only a few months before the release of her coin.

The United States Mint launched these coins officially at 12 pm EDT on June 19, 2007. They provided two versions of the coin: a proof version for $429.95 and an uncirculated version for $410.95.

The United States Mint also produces and makes available to the public bronze medal duplicates of the first spouse gold coins which are not legal tender. In February 2009 Coin World reported that some 2007 Abigail Adams medals were struck using the reverse from the 2008 Louisa Adams medal. These pieces, called mules, were contained within the 2007 first spouse medal set.

Although the First Spouse program ended in 2016, it was continued in 2020 to honor Barbara Bush, who died on April 17, 2018. On February 19, 2025, Senator Catherine Cortez Masto introduced a bill for continuation to honor Rosalynn Carter, who died on November 19, 2023.

A full listing of the coins is:

| Release # | Spouse # | Name | Reverse design | Release date | Proof issue price | Mintage figures | Front/obverse Design | Reverse Design | Dates served |
|---|---|---|---|---|---|---|---|---|---|
| 1 | 1 | Martha Washington | Mrs. Washington sewing, with slogan "First Lady of the Continental Army" | June 19, 2007 | $429.95 | 19,167 | | | 1789–1797 |
| 2 | 2 | Abigail Adams | Mrs. Adams writing her famous "Remember the Ladies" letter | June 19, 2007 | $429.95 | 17,149 | | | 1797–1801 |
| 3 | 3 | Thomas Jefferson's Liberty | Jefferson's grave at Monticello | August 30, 2007 | $429.95 | 19,815 | | | 1801–1809 |
| 4 | 4 | Dolley Madison | Mrs. Madison posing before the Lansdowne Portrait of George Washington, painted by Gilbert Stuart in 1796, which she saved during the 1814 Burning of Washington | November 19, 2007 | $529.95 | 17,943 | | | 1809–1817 |
| 5 | 5 | Elizabeth Monroe | Mrs. Monroe at the reopening of the White House in 1818 | February 28, 2008 | $619.95* | 7,800 | | | 1817–1825 |
| 6 | 6 | Louisa Adams | Mrs. Adams and her son Charles making the dangerous journey from St Petersburg to Paris in 1812 | May 29, 2008 | $619.95* | 6,581 | | | 1825–1829 |
| 7 | 7 | Andrew Jackson's Liberty | Jackson on horseback with his nickname "Old Hickory" | August 28, 2008 | $619.95* | 7,684 | | | 1829–1837 |
| 8 | 8 | Martin Van Buren's Liberty | Van Buren reading in the grass in his home village of Kinderhook | November 25, 2008 | $549.95 | 6,807 | | | 1837–1841 |
| 9 | 9 | Anna Harrison | Mrs. Harrison reading to her children | March 5, 2009 | $629.00 | 6,251 | | | 1841 |
| 10 | 10 | Letitia Tyler | Mrs. Tyler with children on Cedar Grove Plantation | July 2, 2009 | N/A | 5,296 | | | 1841–1842 |
| 10A | 10A | Julia Tyler | Mr. and Mrs. Tyler dancing | August 6, 2009 | N/A | 4,844 | | | 1844–1845 |
| 11 | 11 | Sarah Polk | Mr. and Mrs. Polk working together at a desk in the White House | September 3, 2009 | N/A | 5,151 | | | 1845–1849 |
| 12 | 12 | Margaret Taylor | A young Mrs. Taylor tending to a wounded soldier during the First Seminole War. | December 3, 2009 | N/A | 4,936 | | | 1849–1850 |
| 13 | 13 | Abigail Fillmore | Mrs. Fillmore shelving books in the White House Library, which she established. | March 18, 2010 | N/A | 6,130 | | | 1850–1853 |
| 14 | 14 | Jane Pierce | Mrs. Pierce in the visitors' gallery of the Old Senate Chamber, listening to a debate. | June 3, 2010 | N/A | 4,775 | | | 1853–1857 |
| 15 | 15 | James Buchanan's Liberty | Buchanan working as a bookkeeper in the family store | September 2, 2010 | N/A | 7,110 | | | 1857–1861 |
| 16 | 16 | Mary Todd Lincoln | Mrs. Lincoln giving flowers and a book to Union soldiers during the Civil War | December 2, 2010 | N/A | 6,861 | | | 1861–1865 |
| 17 | 17 | Eliza Johnson | Three children dancing and a Marine Band violinist at the children's ball that was held for President Johnson's 60th birthday. | May 5, 2011 | N/A | 3,887 | | | 1865–1869 |
| 18 | 18 | Julia Grant | Grant and a young Julia Dent horseriding at White Haven, her family home. | June 23, 2011 | N/A | 3,943 | | | 1869–1877 |
| 19 | 19 | Lucy Hayes | Mrs. Hayes hosting the first Easter Egg Roll at the White House, 1877 | September 1, 2011 | N/A | 3,868 | | | 1877–1881 |
| 20 | 20 | Lucretia Garfield | Mrs. Garfield painting on a canvas with brush and palette. | December 1, 2011 | N/A | 3,653 | | | 1881 |
| 21 | 21 | Alice Paul | Alice Paul marching for women's suffrage | October 12, 2012 | N/A | 3,505 | | | N/A † |
| 22 | 22 | Frances Cleveland | Mrs. Cleveland hosting a working women's reception. | November 15, 2012 | N/A | 3,158 | | | 1886–1889 |
| 23 | 23 | Caroline Harrison | orchid and paint brushes | December 6, 2012 | N/A | 3,046 | | | 1889–1892 |
| 24 | 24 | Frances Cleveland | Mrs. Cleveland delivering a speech | December 20, 2012 | N/A | 3,104 | | | 1893–1897 |
| 25 | 25 | Ida McKinley | Mrs. McKinley's hands crocheting slippers; she made thousands which were sold for charity. | November 14, 2013 | N/A | 1,769 | | | 1897–1901 |
| 26 | 26 | Edith Roosevelt | Image of the White House with compass and "The White House Restored 1902" | November 21, 2013 | N/A | 2,851 | | | 1901–1909 |
| 27 | 27 | Helen Taft | Cherry blossom of Prunus serrulata, brought to Washington, DC by Mrs. Taft | December 2, 2013 | $770.00 | 2,579 | | | 1909–1913 |
| 28 | 28 | Ellen Wilson | Commemoration of Mrs. Wilson's creation of the White House Rose Garden | December 9, 2013 | $770.00 | 2,551 | | | 1913–1914 |
| 28A | 28A | Edith Wilson | Image commemorating Mrs. Wilson's support for her husband after his stroke; the President holds onto a cane with Edith's hand resting warmly on top | December 16, 2013 | $770.00 | 2,452 | | | 1915–1921 |
| 29 | 29 | Florence Harding | Items relating to Mrs. Harding's life: ballots and ballot box, camera, torch, and initials referencing World War I veterans | July 10, 2014 | $770.00 | 2,288 | | | 1921–1923 |
| 30 | 30 | Grace Coolidge | U.S.A. spelled out in American Sign Language in front of the White House; Mrs. Coolidge promoted Deaf education | July 17, 2014 | $770.00 | 2,196 | | | 1923–1929 |
| 31 | 31 | Lou Hoover | Radio commemorating Mrs. Hoover's radio address of 19 April 1929, the first by a First Lady | August 14, 2014 | $770.00 | 2,025 | | | 1929–1933 |
| 32 | 32 | Eleanor Roosevelt | A hand lighting a candle, symbolizing her life's work and the global impact of her humanitarian initiatives. | September 4, 2014 | $770.00 | 2,389 | | | 1933–1945 |
| 33 | 33 | Bess Truman | A wheel on railroad tracks, symbolizing Mrs. Truman's support for her husband on his 1948 whistle stop tour | April 16, 2015 | $770.00 | N/A | | | 1945–1953 |
| 34 | 34 | Mamie Eisenhower | Hand holding an I Like Mamie badge | May 7, 2015 | $770.00 | N/A | | | 1953–1961 |
| 35 | 35 | Jacqueline Kennedy | Saucer magnolia flower (planted by Mrs. Kennedy beside the John F. Kennedy Eternal Flame) overlaid on an image of the world. | June 25, 2015 | $770.00 | N/A | | | 1961–1963 |
| 36 | 36 | Lady Bird Johnson | Jefferson Memorial, Washington Monument and flowers in reference to Mrs. Johnson's efforts in the beautification and conservation of America | August 27, 2015 | N/A | N/A | | | 1963–1969 |
| 37 | 37 | Pat Nixon | People standing hand-in-hand surrounding a globe, symbolizing Mrs. Nixon's commitment to volunteerism. | February 18, 2016 | N/A | N/A | | | 1969–1974 |
| 38 | 38 | Elizabeth Ford | Young woman ascending a staircase, representing Mrs. Ford's openness and advocacy regarding addiction, breast cancer and women's rights. | March 25, 2016 | N/A | N/A | | | 1974–1977 |
| 39 | 40 | Nancy Reagan | Mrs. Reagan with two children wearing "Just Say No" T-shirts. | July 1, 2016 | N/A | N/A | | | 1981–1989 |
| 40 | 41 | Barbara Bush | A child reading a book with a road leading to a rising sun, in reference to the Barbara Bush Foundation for Family Literacy. | August 20, 2020 | $1,285.00 | 5,000 | | | 1989–1993 |

* Due to volatility in the gold market, the U.S. Mint lowered the price to $549.95 on November 12, 2008, to more accurately reflect the current spot price of gold. This however constantly changed as the price of gold changed. The mint used pricing range tables to adjust pricing of gold coin: 2016 Pricing Grid

† Chester A. Arthur's wife Ellen died before he succeeded to the presidency. Since there was no first lady during his presidency, the act explicitly states that Alice Paul, who was born during his term, would appear on this coin. Since Paul was never first lady, the coin does not have a served date.

== Other provisions ==
The act also has two other provisions, for the following:

- Issuance of a $50 bullion coin reproducing the 1913 buffalo nickel designed by James Earle Fraser. See American Buffalo (coin)
- Redesign of the reverse of the Lincoln cent in 2009 to show four different scenes from Abraham Lincoln's life in honor of the bicentennial of his birth. These four scenes are:
  1. his birth and early childhood in Kentucky
  2. his formative years in Indiana
  3. his professional life in Illinois
  4. his presidency in Washington, D.C.

In 2009, numismatic cents that have the metallic copper content of cents minted in 1909 were issued for collectors.

Since 2010, another redesigned reverse for the Lincoln cent is being minted; this "shall bear an image emblematic of President Lincoln's preservation of the United States of America as a single and united country", and replaced the Lincoln Memorial reverse in use from 1959 to 2008.

== See also ==
- Other dollar coins featuring the likeness of US presidents:
  - Eisenhower dollar
  - Eisenhower Centennial silver dollar
  - Trump dollar coin
- List of presidents of the United States on currency
- American Innovation dollars
- 50 State quarters
- America the Beautiful quarters
- District of Columbia and United States Territories quarters
- Westward Journey nickel series
- Sacagawea dollar
- United States Bicentennial coinage

| Preceded by Susan B. Anthony dollar | Dollar coin of the United States (2007–2016, 2020) Concurrent with: Sacagawea dollar (2000–present) | Succeeded by American Innovation $1 Coin Program |
