= Phebe Hemphill =

American sculptor

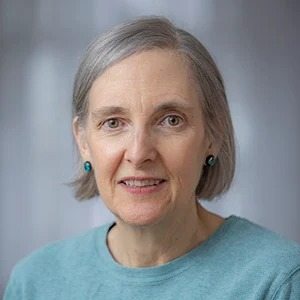
- Born: April 25, 1960 (age 66); West Chester, Pennsylvania, United States
- Education: Pennsylvania Academy of the Fine Arts
- Known for: Sculpture

Phebe Hemphill (born April 25, 1960) is an American sculptor who works for the United States Mint. She has been called "one of the preeminent coin artists, sculptors, and engravers of our time."

== Early life and education ==
Hemphill was born April 25, 1960, in West Chester, Pennsylvania to Dallett Hemphill and Ann Cornwell Hemphill. A number of Phebe Hemphill's family members, including her father and grandfather, were interested in coin and medal collecting. She was directly inspired by her grandfather, Gibbons Gray Cornwell Jr., who did bas-relief sculpture, who in turn was influenced by her great-great aunt, Martha Jackson Cornwell, who worked with Augustus Saint-Gaudens.

Hemphill attended Agnes Irwin School for girls in Philadelphia, Pennsylvania, graduating in 1978. Hemphill trained at the Pennsylvania Academy of the Fine Arts, graduating in 1987. She also studied with Evangelos Frudakis. Hemphill includes Jules-Clément Chaplain, Jean-Baptiste Daniel-Dupuis, Oscar Roty, Augustus Saint-Gaudens, and Adolph A. Weinman among her artistic influences.

== Sculpture ==
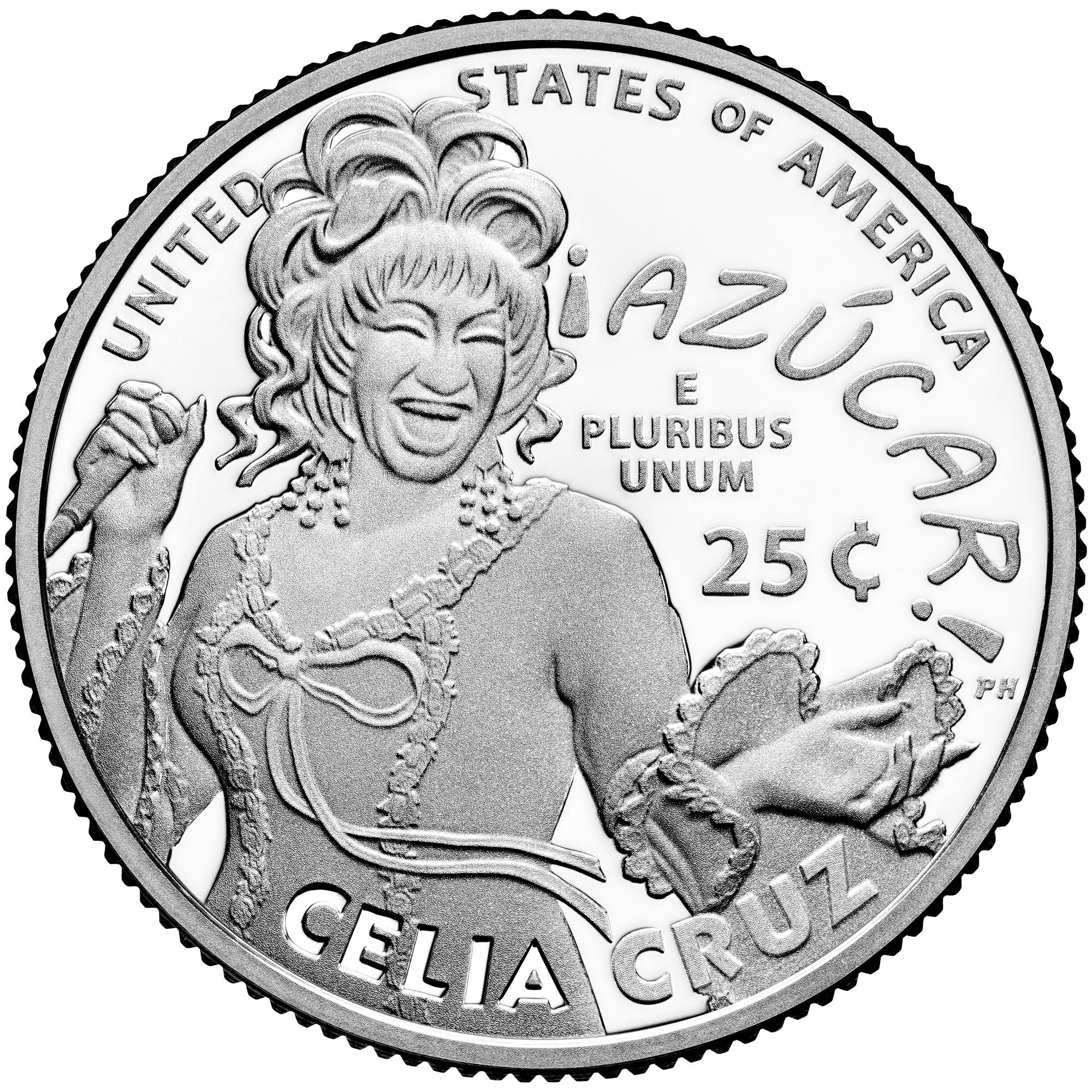
An American Women quarter featuring Celia Cruz, sculpted by Hemphill and released in 2024

In 1987, Hemphill joined the Franklin Mint in the sculpture department. She remained there until 2002, working on porcelain and medallic art. From 2002 until 2005 she worked as a staff sculptor at McFarlane Toys, in Bloomingdale, New Jersey.

In 2006, she joined the United States Mint in Philadelphia. She has sculpted many coins and medals for the U.S. Mint, including the 2013 Presidential $1 Coin obverse for William McKinley; the 2011 September 11 National Medal World Trade center obverse; the Monuments men bronze medal; and coin series of Five-Star Generals, First Spouses and Code talkers. Several America the Beautiful quarters including Gettysburg, the Grand Canyon, Mount Hood, and Yosemite are also Hemphill's work.

Hemphill lives in Philadelphia. She frequently visits sites which will be featured in her work, including Shenandoah National Park and the September 11 attack locations. She uses both digital and traditional methods in her work, working with 3-D imaging software as well as creating coin designs on clay blanks the size of dinner plates.

In the 2020s, Hemphill worked on the American Women quarters series.

== Exhibitions ==
Hemphill's work has been shown by the National Sculpture Society, the American Medallic Sculpture Association, the F.A.N. Gallery in Philadelphia, and West Chester University.

== Awards ==
- 2014, Winner of Congressional Medal Design Contest for the September 11 attacks
- 2000, Alex J. Ettel Grant, National Sculpture Society
- 2001, Renaissance Sculpture Award, the Franklin Mint
