= Drift boat =

Type of boat

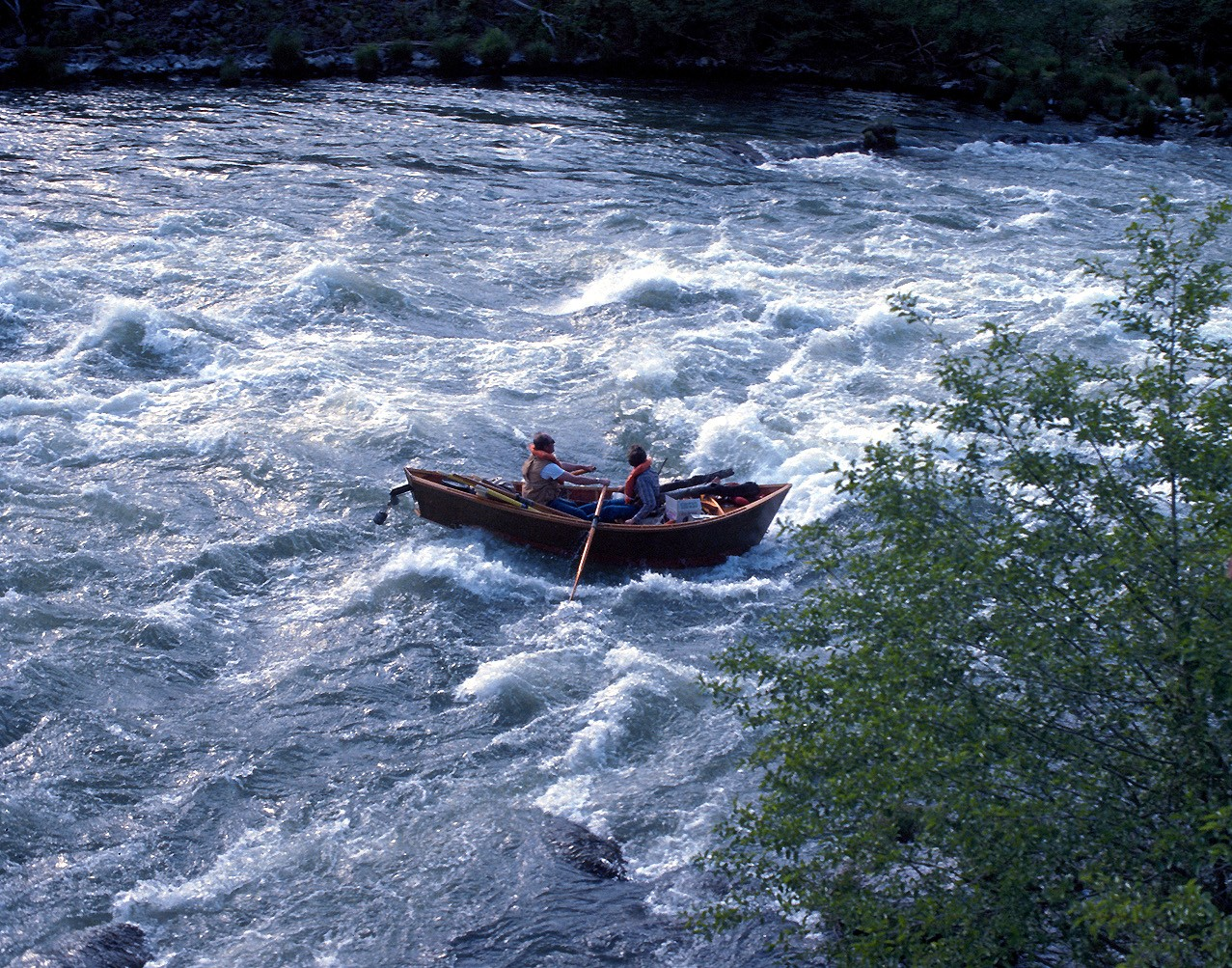
A McKenzie River dory, or drift boat, on the Boxcar Rapids of the Deschutes River near Maupin, Oregon

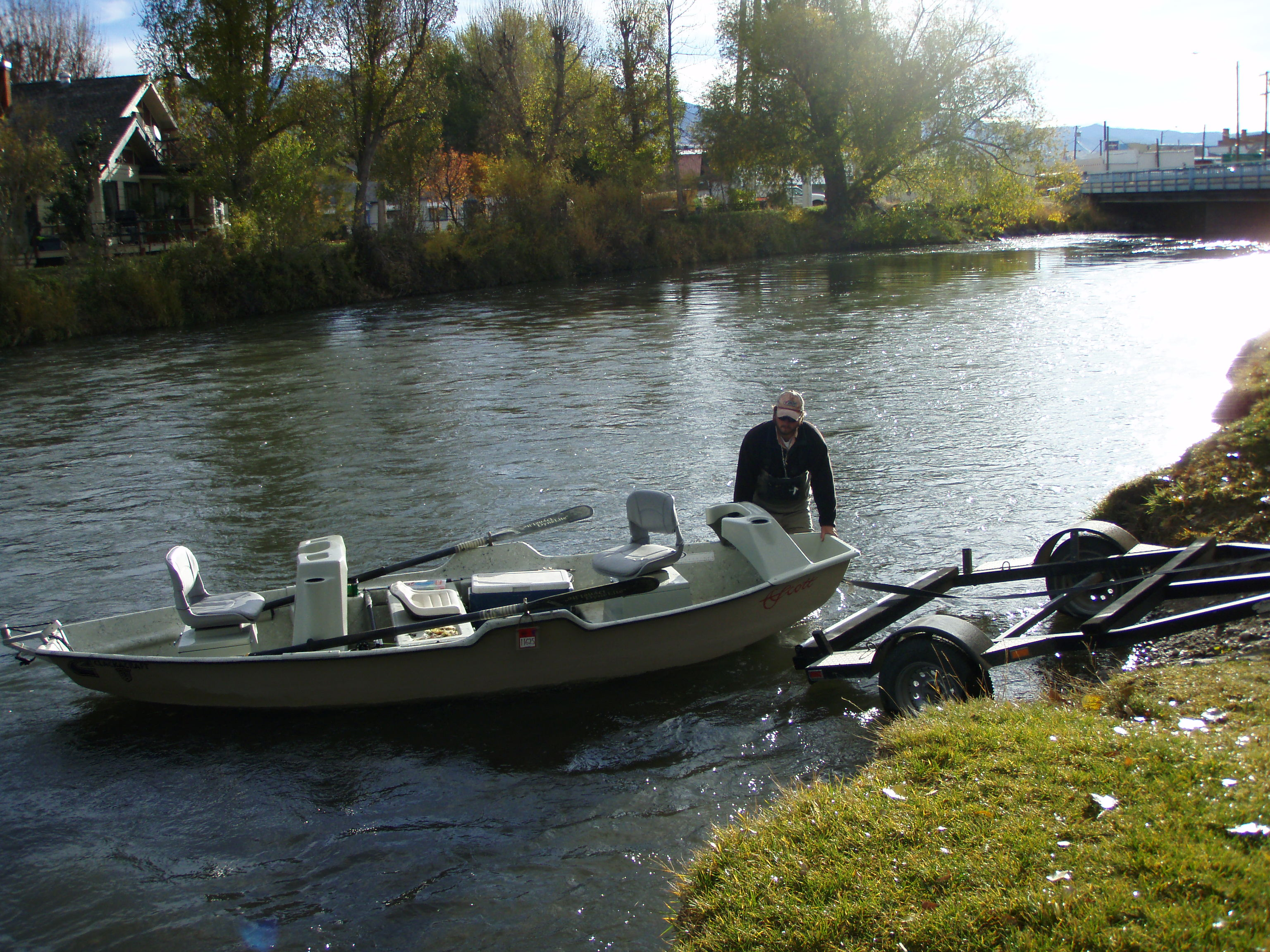
Drift boat launch on the Beaverhead river, Twin Bridges, Montana

A Drift Boat is an evolution of the open-water dory, converted for use in rivers. The design is characterized by a wide, flat bottom, flared sides, a narrow, flat bow, and a pointed stern. A Rocker is used along an arc from bow to stern along the bottom of the boat. It is this constant rocker that allows the boat to spin about its center for ease in maneuvering in rapids.

== Hull materials ==
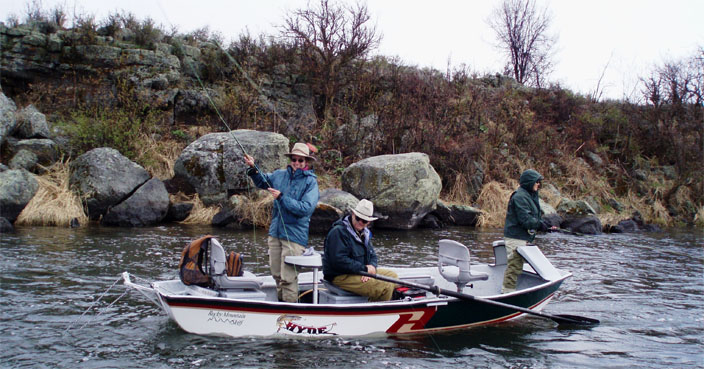
Anglers fly fishing drift boat

The earliest drift boats were made out of various types of wood. Later boats were made with lower maintenance materials like aluminum, fiberglass, or plastic.

In 1992 the film "A River Runs Through It" featured a wooden drift boat running "the shoots", a series of rapids (filmed in Montana). This portrayal of using drift boats in class I -IV rapids is only one application for this unique watercraft. Today river fishing is among the major uses of these boats. Innovation has changed the design from anglers primarily sitting in the boat while fishing, to today's application of anglers standing in a leg brace to fish.

== Rogue River dory ==
The Rogue River dories are completely flat on the bottom with upward rakes under the prow and the stern unlike the McKenzie boats. The Rogue River guides needed a boat with greater carrying capacity, and the ability to hold the current. The Rogue River dory is not quite as responsive as the McKenzie River dory but is typically larger than the McKenzie dory and is used where many people and large amounts of gear need to be carried. The high prow, great carrying capacity, and ease of rowing makes it the preferred dory for commercial use. The classic Rogue River dory with a nearly full deck is a favorite among guides on the Colorado River, while on the same river, the decked McKenzie River dory has a large following among do-it-yourself river runners.

== McKenzie dories ==
McKenzie dories are specialized to run rapids on rivers, and first appeared on the McKenzie River in Oregon in the mid-20th century. They have a wide flat bottom for low draft, a narrow bow that is flat, often mistaken for the transom, which instead is pointed. The reason for this is that the rower faces downstream, therefore the part of the boat which first hits the waves (approaching from behind) must be pointed or very narrow to throw the water to the side. The bow is then widened so that a small outboard motor and/or anchor bracket can be attached. Those unfamiliar with the craft would say that they are rowed backwards. McKenzie dories without a transom are called "double-enders". McKenzie River dories are mainly used by recreational boaters who wish to operate a very responsive boat. Like the Rogue River boats described above, the McKenzie River dory provides a much more responsive boating experience than that of a rubber raft. While the McKenzie River dory is a safe watercraft, operating any dory requires keeping river conditions in mind at all times.
