= Atelier-Théâtre Burkinabé =

Burkinabè theatre group

The Atelier-Théâtre Burkinabé (ATB) is a Burkinabé theatre group in the West African nation of Burkina Faso which practises "theatre for development".

== Overview ==
The ATB was founded on June 18, 1978, by Prosper Komparoré. Inspired by his Komparoré's own heritage, and by the forum theatre technique of Brazilian playwright Augusto Boal, the ATB focuses on the participation and creativity of the audience. The audience are encouraged to take part in debates following the productions, where they critique the actors' performances and create different scenarios. The theme of the productions generally revolve around economic, social, technical or cultural development and are known as "social theatre" or "theatre for development". The group established a permanent headquarters in Ouagadougou in June 1991.

The ATB is made up of volunteer actors, and includes children, who are taught by adult actors. Every year, the ATB produces about 10 plays in major cities, and approximately 30 forum theatre pieces in towns and villages. In 1999, Komparoré opened a centre for theatrical arts at the ATB for the purpose of training animateurs and entrepreneurs. They also collaborate with other theatre groups and organisations including the National Federation of Forum Theatre (FNTF).

== See also ==
- Theatre in Burkina Faso
