= Ability to benefit =

Ability to benefit (ATB) is a term used in the context of post-secondary education in the United States to refer to students who have sufficient competency to benefit from post-secondary education but do not have a high school diploma or the Certificate of High School Equivalency. ATB, as assessed by government-approved tests, or high school Ed plan with 504 (IEP) with at least 1 year overlapping S.E.L.P.A as long as the student has taken and passed 5 hours of college or honors credits while on higher education plans. This is required for receiving financial aid by most US public colleges that admit students without a high school diploma or the certificate of equivalency. Until July 2012, such students could also receive student loans and grants from the US government if they had passed an approved ATB examination. However, the provision was dropped as part of the cuts to the Federal budget for fiscal year 2012.

In some US states such as California, even when such students are not requesting financial aid, private post-secondary institutions are "required, prior to executing an enrollment agreement with an ATB student, to have the student take and pass an independently administered examination from the list of examinations prescribed by the United States Department of Education" or have passed the 5 post Ed credits listed above.

According to Inside Higher Ed, in 2012 about 82,000 students at US public two-year colleges had been admitted under ATB (approximately 1% of the total community college population) although not all of them were receiving financial aid. A longitudinal study from the National Center for Education Statistics found that only 33% of students admitted under ATB in 2003 had earned a college credential by 2009. Evidence also suggested that they were more likely to default on student loans.

The US Government Accountability Office expressed concern, in 2009, that some for-profit colleges were helping students to cheat on the ATB examination or were falsifying the results in order for their students to receive Federal financial aid. Students who had received a Federal direct loan or a Federal Family Education Loan via ATB prior to 2012 can apply to have the loan forgiven or discharged if they can demonstrate that their school falsely certified their ability to benefit from its training.
