= Don Everhart =

American sculptor

- Born: Donald Nelson Everhart II; August 19, 1949 (age 77); York, Pennsylvania, U.S.
- Known for: Coin and medal engraving, sculpting
- Notable work: President Bill Clinton Second Inaugural Medal; U.S. Presidential Dollar Statue of Liberty reverse; 2005 Thomas Jefferson nickel obverse; Hermit Crab medal
- Style: Bas-relief, numismatic sculpture

Donald Nelson Everhart II (born August 19, 1949 in York, Pennsylvania) is an American coin and medal engraver-medalist, and sculptor who has worked for the private Franklin Mint, as a freelance designer, and since 2004 has worked for the United States Mint in Philadelphia. With over 1,000 models for coins and medals attributed to him as of 2008, he is still at the prime of his career creating the bas-relief models for these and similar sculptural objects. His coin designs are in the pockets of American citizens, and despite his late arrival to the series of the popular U.S. Statehood Quarters, he has designed and modeled three State's unique reverse designs, modeled three others, and six U.S. commemorative coins. His portrait of President William Clinton was chosen for Clinton's second term Inaugural Medal. Among his other medal creations are six Congressional Gold Medals for the U.S. Mint, seven Society of Medalists issues, twelve calendar medals, and other models for private medal makers, as well as cast art medals.

== Coin models for mints ==
Everhart modeled coins of realm for foreign governments at the Franklin Mint for coin sets sold to collectors. Countries he did work for include Guyana, The Philippine Islands, Panama, Jamaica, The Netherlands Antilles, Papua New Guinea, Barbados, and Cook Islands.

For the United States Mint, (2004 – present), he created (designed and modeled) Statehood Quarter reverses for Nevada, Hawaii, New Mexico, and has modeled California, Montana and Idaho designed by other artists. Other circulating coins include the 2005 nickel obverse profile of Thomas Jefferson, the first new obverse design on the nickel in 67 years.

For the new U.S. Presidential Dollar series, beginning in 2007, he designed and modeled the Statue of Liberty reverse to appear on all issues. He designed and modeled John Quincy Adams, the sixth coin in the series, and modeled the fourth, a James Madison obverse. He designed and modeled Dolly Madison obverse for the First Spouse gold coin, 2007, Elizabeth Monroe obverse, 2008, and modeled the Martha Washington reverse.

U.S. commemorative coins he has designed or modeled include the obverse portrait of the Benjamin Franklin Founding Father silver dollar, 2006; Little Rock Central High School Desegregation silver dollar reverse, 2007; Jamestown 400th Anniversary silver dollar obverse, 2007; the Bald Eagle Silver Dollar obverse, 2008 the $5 Gold Bald Eagle reverse.

As a freelance commission he designed and modeled a series of 25 Marshall Islands coins for the British Royal Mint, 1990–91. Each coin bore a legendary World War II aircraft. He also modeled a commemorative coin for the Royal Norwegian Mint.

== Medals of national importance ==
President William Clinton Second Inauguration Medal, Don Everhart

Everhart's medallic portrait of President William Clinton was chosen over other artists portraits for Clinton's Second Inaugural Medal, 1997. Clinton himself choose Everhart's portrait over two other finalists’ models.

For the U.S. Mint he prepared six Congressional Medals. He designed and modeled both sides of the Michael E. Debakey Medal, 2007; and one side for each of the following, Norman Borlaug Medal, 2006, Byron Nelson Medal, 2006, Dalai Lama Medal, 2006, and the Tuskegee Airman Medal, 2006. He modeled the reverse of the Jackie Robinson Gold Medal, 2003. As of May, 2019, he has designed parts of 37 Congressional Gold Medals.

He is one of only four sculptors who were asked to prepare more than one medal for the 70-year-old medal series, The Society of Medalists, all struck by Medallic Art Company. Everhart has done seven. His first, Dance of the Dolphins, Issue #106 for 1992, was followed by The Fossil Record, Issue #125, then a set of five – all dinosaurs in freeform shape, forming a series within a series.

== Calendar and medals with nature themes ==
Chameleon Medal, Don Everhart

A favorite theme of Everhart's is nature. In the 1990s he choose natural themes to create a series of cast art medals: Chameleon (1991), Crocodile Rock (1993), Sprint Finish (1992) and Leapfrog (1993). Natural themes were also utilized in privately commissioned calendar medals such as Dance of the Dolphins (1984) and Sea Otters (1993). Medallic Art Company commissioned him for other calendar medals: Sea Life (1993), Jungle Life (1994), Mountain Life (1995), and Pond Life (1996). In addition he created seven calendar medals for the Franklin Mint.

Hermit Crab Medal, Don Everhart

His nature theme is best illustrated by the Hermit Crab Medal (1991) as part of the Brookgreen Gardens Membership Medal Series. It was the series' first non-round, freestanding medal.

In addition to the U.S. Mint, Medallic Art Company and Franklin Mint, his medallic creations of many themes and subjects have also been produced by Northwest Territorial Mint, Hamilton Mint, Medal Craft, Hoffman Mint, Royal British Mint and the Royal Norwegian Mint.

Everhart also made the Dance of the Dolphin, which has a 1984 calendar on the back. He is said to have a special connection to dolphins, which is why he made such a medallion.

== Sculpture work ==
For the Walt Disney Company he created many figurines of Disney characters in addition to giftware items for Lenox, Tiffany & Co, the Hamilton Collection, Bradford Exchange, Enesco, and Schmid. For Georgetown University he created a life size bulldog, the school mascot, a pair of bronze relief seals for the university's front gates, a relief plaque of basketball coach John Thompson, a portrait medal of the university's founder John Carroll, and 24 piece Sports Hall of Fame installation of bronze bas-relief plaques honoring great athletes from the school's past.

== Awards ==
American Numismatic Association Sculptor of the Year, 1994. National Sculpture Society First Prize for Reliefs, Medals (SoM #106 Dance Dolphins) 1985. Krause Publications Coin Of The Year (COTY) finalists for U.S. Nevada Quarter, 2006; and Benjamin Franklin Founding Father Silver Dollar, 2006.

== Memberships ==
- American Medallic Sculpture Association, AMSA, President 1992-94
- Fédération International de la Médaille, FIDEM (frequent exhibitor)
- American Numismatic Association, ANA (on 3 committees)

Sculptor member:

- National Sculpture Society
- Chester County Art Association

== See also ==
- 50 State Quarters
