= Penny (Canadian coin) =

Former Canadian coin worth one cent

One cent
- Canada
- Value: 0.01 Canadian dollar
- Mass: 2.35 g
- Diameter: 19.05 mm
- Thickness: 1.45 mm
- Edge: Smooth
- Composition: 94% steel; 1.5% Ni; 4.5% Cu plating
- Years of minting: 1858–2012

Obverse
- Design: Elizabeth II, Queen of Canada
- Designer: Susanna Blunt
- Design date: 2003
- Design discontinued: 2013

Reverse
- Design: Maple leaf branch
- Designer: G.E. Kruger Gray
- Design date: 1937
- Design discontinued: 2013

In Canada, the penny, officially the one-cent coin, is a coin worth one cent, or 1/100 of a Canadian dollar. (Note: The Royal Canadian Mint refers to the coin as the "1-cent coin", but in practice the terms penny and cent predominate.) These coins were minted from 1858 to 2012 and were primarily struck in a bronze or a bronze-plated alloy throughout their production. Like all Canadian coins, the obverse depicts the reigning Canadian monarch at the time of issue.

Attempts to abolish the penny in Canada were initially met with resistance as they were considered a necessity to pay provincial sales taxes. While money had been lost in penny production since at least the mid-1980s, the issue only grew to prominence in the late 2000s. Studies conducted by the Parliament of Canada, along with at least one survey, concluded that the penny was falling out of use due to inflation, which had eroded the coin's value. Production of the penny ended in May 2012 and the Royal Canadian Mint ceased distribution of them on February 4, 2013.

Although the penny retains its legal tender status, vendors now round customer purchases to the nearest five cents (nickel). Commemorative events that have been featured on the penny since 1967 (Canadian Centennial) continue to be featured on non-circulating coins for collectors.

== Etymology ==
In Canadian French, the penny is often known by the loanword cent; in contrast with the heteronymous word meaning "hundred" (French: [sɑ̃]), this keeps the English pronunciation [sɛnt]. Slang terms include cenne, cenne noire, or sou noir (black penny), although common Quebec French usage is sou.

== History ==
=== Large cents (1858–1920) ===
The first pennies minted for what would later become the Canadian Confederation originated in legislation enacted in 1853. Per the Act 16 Vict. c. 158, the Province of Canada was to issue "dollars, cents, and mills" that would co-circulate with English shillings and pence. After five years, an order to mint new coins came in 1858 as an effort to improve the Canadian monetary system. This was needed as by this time, the pounds, shillings, livres, and sous in circulation had become antiquated. Pennies, or one-cent coins, were struck in bronze, had a diameter of 25.4 millimetres (1 in) and weighed 4.54 grams (1/100 lb) each. Coinage for pennies was commenced so late in the year that the bulk of the large order for cents had to be completed in 1859. The 10,000,000 coins ordered easily exceeded the demand and wants of the public that year as the population in the Province of Canada at the time was not even 2,000,000 people.

This had a ripple effect, as the "ample supply" of newly issued coins were not withdrawn from circulation. The government of Canada had to intervene over the next 10 years by releasing them into circulation at a 20 percent discount. Fresh production of new cents (with their weight increased to 5.67 grams or 1/5 ounce) was not required until 1876. These pennies all have an "H" mintmark on them as they were made in Birmingham, England, by Ralph Heaton & Sons. Heaton continued to mint pennies for Canada in 1881 and 1882 while providing new coin presses and other machinery to the Royal Mint in London. From a business standpoint, this was a failure for Heaton as they "partly sabotaged" their own company by doing so. Enlargements to the facilities at the Royal Mint were completed in 1883, which meant they could handle Canadian coin production. The Royal Mint's deputy master made it "clearly known" to Canada's high commissioner in London that Canadian coinage would be handled by the Royal Mint. Pennies dated 1884, and those dated 1886 to 1888, were all made in London for Canada.

In 1890, the Royal Mint turned to Heaton again for coinage as there was possibly a "rush of business" that year. By this time, the mint was operating under a new name as Ralph Heaton III turned his father's mint into a limited liability company in 1889. The former Heaton Mint was now referred to as "The Mint, Birmingham, Limited" aka Birmingham Mint. When mintage for pennies returned to London in 1891, the Canadian Bankers Association noted that some of those made that year were re-coined. Canadian pennies continued to be minted in England until 1907 with the opening of the Ottawa Mint. Concurrently, Queen Victoria died in 1901 and was succeeded by Edward VII, which required a new obverse portrait for the penny. British medalist George William de Saulles was chosen for the job, and designed a right-facing bust of the King with the words "Edwardus VII Dei gratia Rex Imperator" and "Canada". This portrait was used until Edward's death in 1910, and controversy arose the following year with a new design for George V.

King George V's portrait was designed by Australian sculptor and medalist Bertram Mackennal with the words "Georgius V Rex et Ind:Imp:"; however, this was criticized by the public as the decision to omit "Dei gratia" (by the grace of God) was called "godless" and "graceless". As a result, the words Dei gra were added into the design the following year, and large cents continued to be produced until 1920. Pennies were reduced to their modern size that year which brought them closer in size to the American penny.

=== Small cents (1920–1952) ===
On May 11, 1920, the Parliament of Canada issued a proclamation (effective May 15) about a "New Bronze Cent" which was to be 19.1 mm (3/4 in) wide with a weight of 3.2 grams (50 gr). These smaller pennies featured an unchanged obverse design with the effigy of George V looking left surrounded by abbreviations. The reverse was given a new design with "the words one cent supported by a maple leaf on either side, and bearing the word Canada above and the date of issue below." During this transition period the old large cents were not withdrawn, but they were allowed to wear down through circulation until their redemption. Starting in 1922, a "period of economic malaise" that lasted throughout the mid-1920s led to low mintage amounts for pennies. Mintage figures "marked a hesitant return" in 1926; over two million pieces were struck that year. When King George V died in January 1936 his son Edward VIII assumed the throne, but he abdicated in December.

After his brother George VI assumed the throne on December 11, 1936, a new effigy was needed for Canadian coinage. As it was late in the year, the Royal Mint could not immediately make coins with a die depicting the new king with a 1937 date. It was instead decided by the mint to continue minting 1936 dated pennies with a dot added below the date on the reverse which signified that they were made in 1937. According to mint records 678,823 of these coins were minted; however, only three are known to have survived to the present. The new effigy of George VI was designed by Humphrey Paget and was ready for use later in the year. The king is shown on the obverse side facing left, with the inscription "Georgius VI D:G: Rex et Ind:Imp:". The reverse was designed by George Kruger Gray and depicted a maple twig with two leaves; the wording 1 cent appears above them, and Canada with the date is shown below. While pennies with their new design continued to be minted unabated throughout World War II, there was a change in composition. Starting on April 1, 1942, Canadian pennies had their copper content increased from 95.5 percent to 98 percent and their tin content lowered from 3 percent to 0.5 percent.

The Indian Independence Act 1947 affected the penny, as the abbreviation Ind:Imp: ('Emperor of India') had to be removed from the obverse of the coin. This change was made under article 7.2 of the act. As the dies omitting the title were not immediately ready for use, a small maple leaf was added next to the 1947-dated coins on the reverse for pennies minted into 1948. This was not the first major alteration; from a collector's standpoint "the mid-20th century brought a series of varieties to Canadian coins". King George VI died in 1952, and a new obverse effigy featuring Queen Elizabeth II appeared in the following year.

=== Small cents (1953–2009) ===
The first effigy of Queen Elizabeth II was designed by sculptor and medalist Mary Gillick, who chose to depict the queen at 27 years old facing right. As with the previous monarchs, her effigy is surrounded with Latin text which reads "Elizabeth II Dei gratia Regina" (Elizabeth II, by the grace of God, Queen). For Canadian coinage, this marked the first time that master dies were made at the Royal Canadian Mint. Canadian pennies dated 1953 to 1955 come in two major varieties "with and without a fold of fabric" (aka strap) on the new effigy. The reason for this remains unclear as proposed theories include overly polished dies, or alternatively the relief of the effigy being too high to strike properly. In 1956, the Master of the Royal Canadian Mint noted that 407 kilograms (898 lb) of worn bronze coins and 247 kilograms (545 lb) of World War II–era tombac nickels were converted for use in one-cent coinage. High-speed presses were installed at the mint in the early 1960s, which meant that more Canadian pennies were being made at rates that exceeded 70% when compared to prior years.

In 1964, Queen Elizabeth approved a second effigy of herself on Canadian coinage, which was made by British artist and sculptor Arnold Machin. This second bust features the Queen facing right while wearing a tiara surrounded by Latin text where "Dei gratia" is abbreviated again to read "D.G." When these new pennies debuted in 1965, the denticles on both sides of the coin were replaced by beads, but these were affected by striking difficulties. Canada celebrated its centennial in 1967; this was marked by a special design on the reverse side of each circulating denomination. For the penny, artist Alex Colville designed a depiction of a rock dove in flight, with a dual date of "1867–1967". The reverse design reverted to George Kruger Gray's maple leaf in 1968, and in 1978 slight changes were made to the composition and thickness which gave the pennies a "thin planchet". Further changes were made to the penny in 1980 which included a slight reduction of 0.05 mm in diameter, and a weight change from 3.24 g to 2.8 g. These specifications only lasted another year before the penny was changed again in both shape and weight.

Canadian pennies minted from 1982 to 1996 have a twelve-sided edge to them, which was put in place to help assist the visually impaired. While their composition did not change, these new pennies are also lighter: their weight was further reduced from 2.8 to 2.5 g. This did not help production costs: the Royal Canadian Mint noted in 1984 that a penny cost more than its face value to produce. In 1990, a third effigy of the queen was used for Canadian pennies which was designed by Hungarian-Canadian sculptor Dora de Pedery-Hunt. This third design depicts Elizabeth II when she was 64 years old surrounded by the previously used Latin script. Pennies minted in the 1990s include a dual-dated "1867–1992" coin which marked Canada's 125th anniversary. In 1997, the penny was changed from bronze to copper-plated zinc, which reduced the weight of the coin from 2.5 g to 2.25 g. The twelve-sided shape was changed back to a round shape during this time as the copper-plated zinc proved difficult to plate.

Elizabeth II was honoured on the penny in 2002 as the coins carried a dual date of "1952–2002", for her Golden Jubilee. Penny mintages for "2002" also include those marked with and without a "P" below Elizabeth II's bust. This letter identifies those made of copper-plated steel, as opposed to those with copper-plated zinc. Two effigies of the Queen were used in the following year which include Hunt's "old effigy", and a fourth and final effigy made by portrait artist Susanna Blunt. This final depiction of the Queen shows a right-facing uncrowned bust with the same previously used Latin script. While the "P" mark below her bust was later dropped and replaced with the RCM logo in 2007, pennies continued to be minted using the two different compositions. To identify the difference, those made of plated steel are dubbed "magnetic" as they stick to a magnet, as opposed to the "non-magnetic" copper-plated zinc coins.

=== Abolition (2010–2013) ===
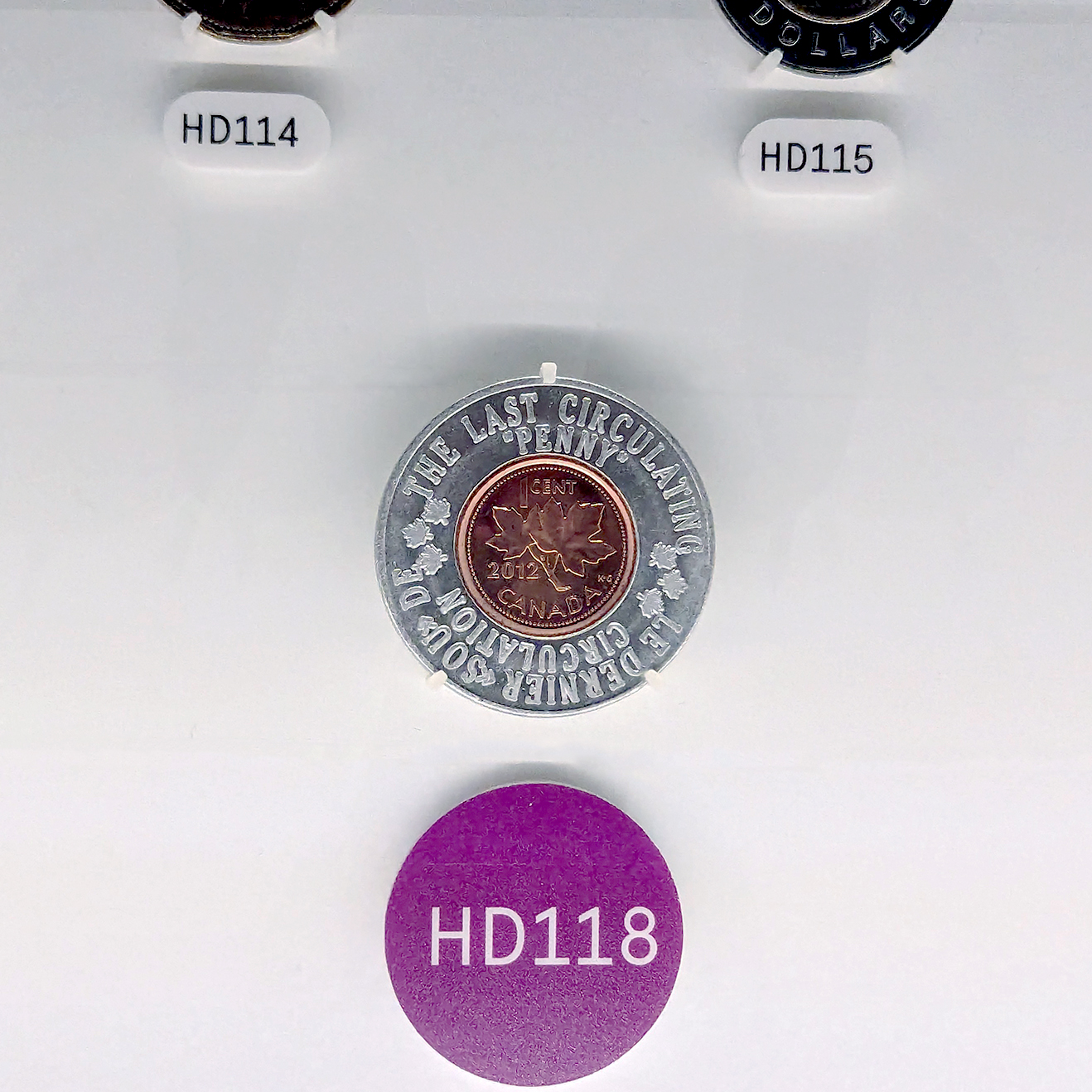
The last Canadian penny on display at the Bank of Canada Museum.

Canadian pennies had been a money-losing coin several times since at least 1984. Although several attempts were made to abolish the penny, these were met with resistance as they were considered a necessity to pay provincial sales taxes. Attitudes against the penny began to grow more in 2007 as the year marked the coin's centennial by the Ottawa Mint (now the RCM). During this time, a survey was conducted by the Desjardins Group which mentioned that the government produced about 825 million pennies per year from 2001 to 2005. Results from the survey indicated that as only 37 percent of Canadians used pennies, this amounted to 25 pennies per person. While no immediate action was taken by the Canadian government, studies were eventually conduced by parliament three years later.

Sometime in mid-2010, the Standing Senate Committee on National Finance began a study on the future of the one-cent coin. The committee's study concluded towards the end of the year, and on December 14, 2010, they recommended the penny be removed from circulation. Their argument concluded that a century of inflation had eroded the value and usefulness of the one-cent piece. Rather than being spent, they estimated that the average Canadian had as many as 600 pennies hoarded away. The Royal Canadian Mint was thus forced to produce large amounts of pennies as they disappeared from circulation due to hoarding or avoidance by the public. On March 29, 2012, the federal government announced in its budget that it would withdraw the penny from circulation in the fourth quarter of 2012. In their reasoning the government cited the cost of producing a penny which was 1.6 cents per coin.

The final penny was minted at the Royal Canadian Mint's Winnipeg, Manitoba, plant on the morning of May 4, 2012. This widely publicized event included former finance minister Jim Flaherty, who ceremoniously "pushed a few buttons on the giant machine that pressed the final penny". It was then entrusted to the Bank of Canada Museum in Ottawa, where it can be seen on display. On February 4, 2013, the mint began melting down the estimated 35 billion pennies that were in circulation. On the same day, Google celebrated the beginning of the end for the Canadian penny with a Google Doodle.

=== Aftermath ===
Cash transactions in Canada are now rounded to the nearest multiple of 5 cents. The rounding is not done on each individual item, but on the total amount, with totals being rounded to the nearest multiple of 5, i.e., totals ending in 1 or 2 round down to 0, totals ending in 3, 4, 6, or 7 round to 5, and totals ending in 8 or 9 round up to 10. This is typical of cash rounding methods (not specific to Canada). While existing pennies will remain legal tender indefinitely, those in circulation were withdrawn on February 4, 2013.

Based on technical specifications provided by the Mint Act, only pennies produced from 1982 to their discontinuation in 2013 are still legally "circulation coins". The Currency Act says that "A payment in coins [...] is a legal tender for no more than [...] twenty-five cents if the denomination is one cent." Nevertheless, once distribution of the coin ceased, vendors were no longer expected to return pennies as change for cash purchases and were encouraged to round purchases to the nearest five cents. Goods can still be priced in one-cent increments, with non-cash transactions like credit cards being paid to the exact cent.

== Composition and size ==
| Years | Mass | Diameter/shape | Composition |
|---|---|---|---|
| 1858–1859 | 4.54 g (70 gr) | 25.4 mm (1 in), round | 95% copper, 5% tin & zinc (bronze) |
| 1876–1920 | 5.67 g (87 1/2 gr) | 25.4 mm (1 in), round | 95.5% copper, 3% tin, 1.5% zinc |
| 1920–1941 | 3.24 g (50 gr) | 19.1 mm (3/4 in), round | 95.5% copper, 3% tin, 1.5% zinc |
| 1942–1977 | 3.24 g (50 gr) | 19.1 mm (3/4 in), round | 98% copper, 0.5% tin, 1.5% zinc |
| 1978–1979 | 3.24 g (50 gr) | 19.1 mm (3/4 in), round | 98% copper, 1.75% tin, 0.25% zinc |
| 1980–1981 | 2.8 g | 19 mm (3/4 in), round | 98% copper, 1.75% tin, 0.25% zinc |
| 1982–1996 | 2.5 g | 19.1 mm (3/4 in), 12-sided | 98% copper, 1.75% tin, 0.25% zinc |
| 1997–2012 | 2.25 g | 19.1 mm (3/4 in), round | 98.4% zinc, 1.6% copper plating |
| 2002–2012 | 2.35 g | 19.1 mm (3/4 in), round | 94% steel, 1.5% nickel, 4.5% copper plating |

== Circulation figures ==
=== Victoria & Edward VII ===
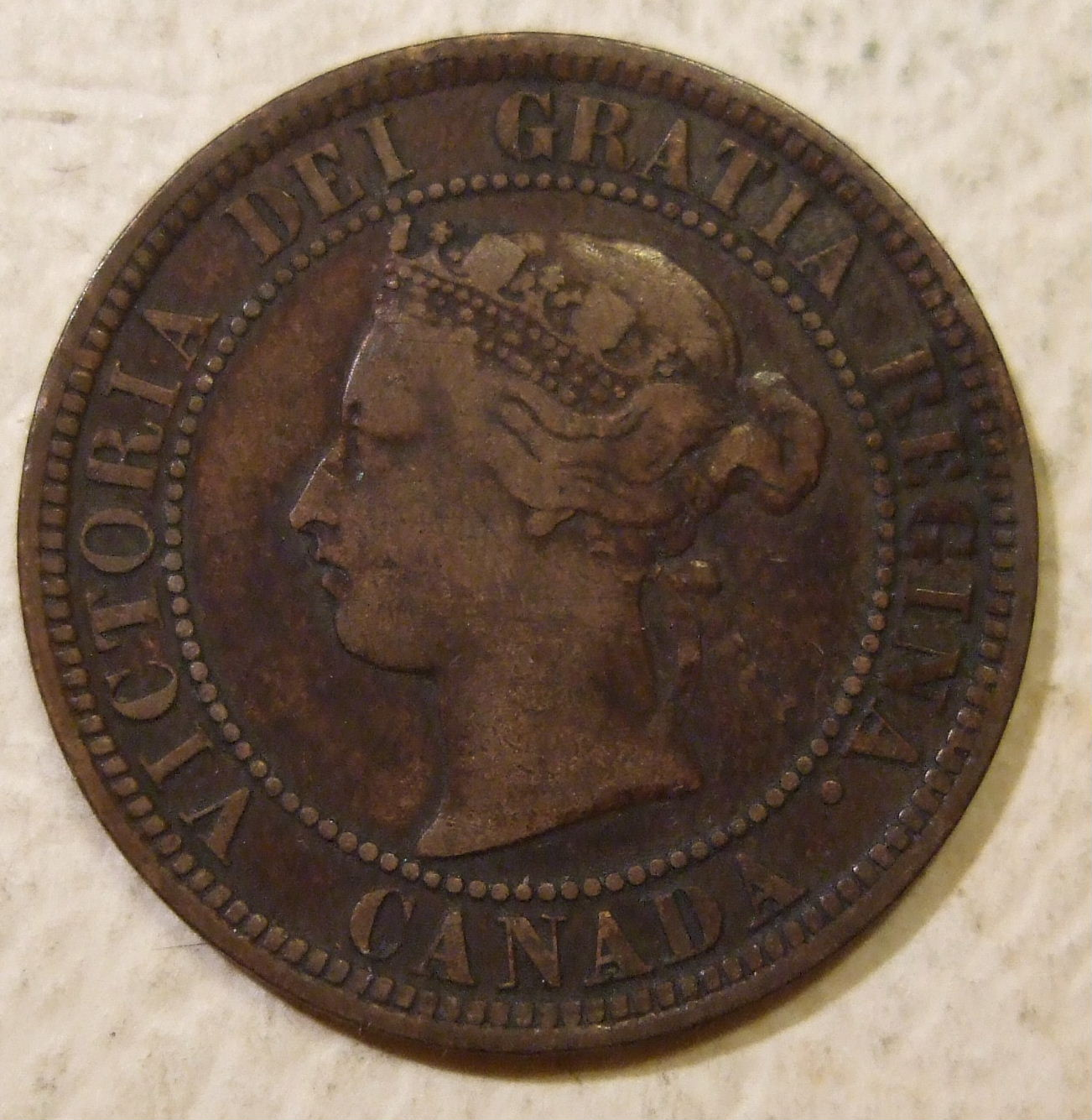
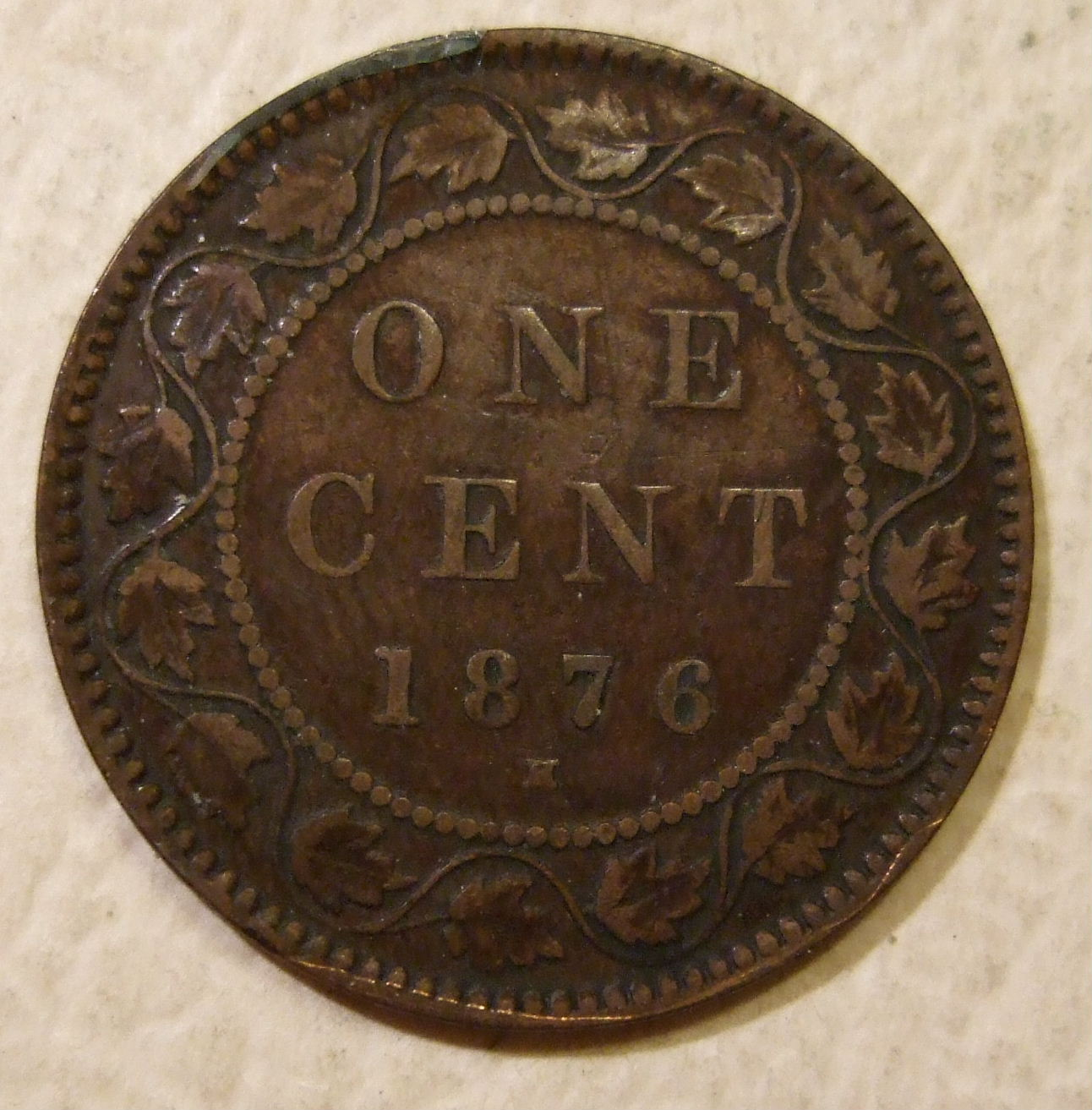
An 1876 penny featuring Queen Victoria
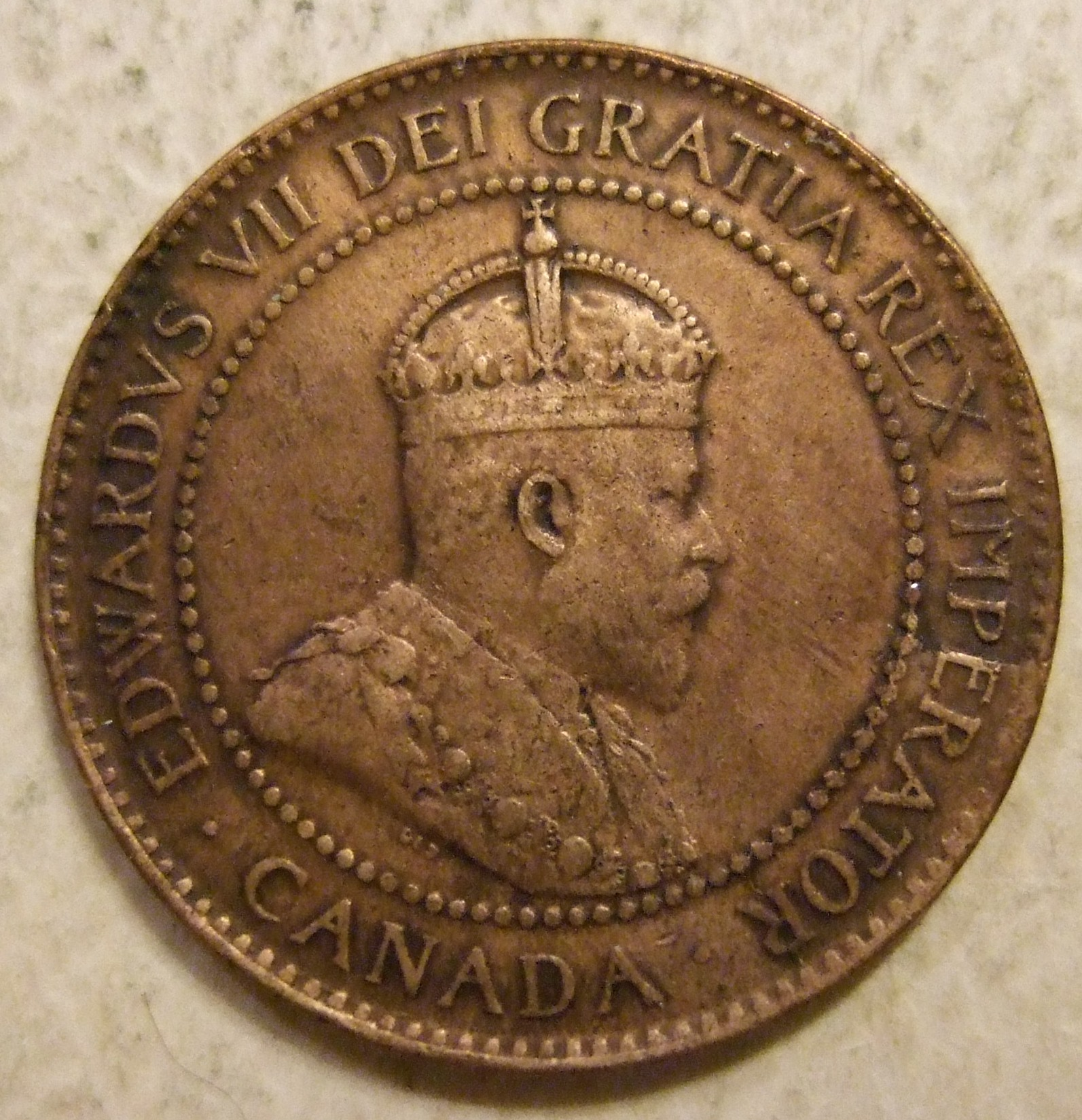
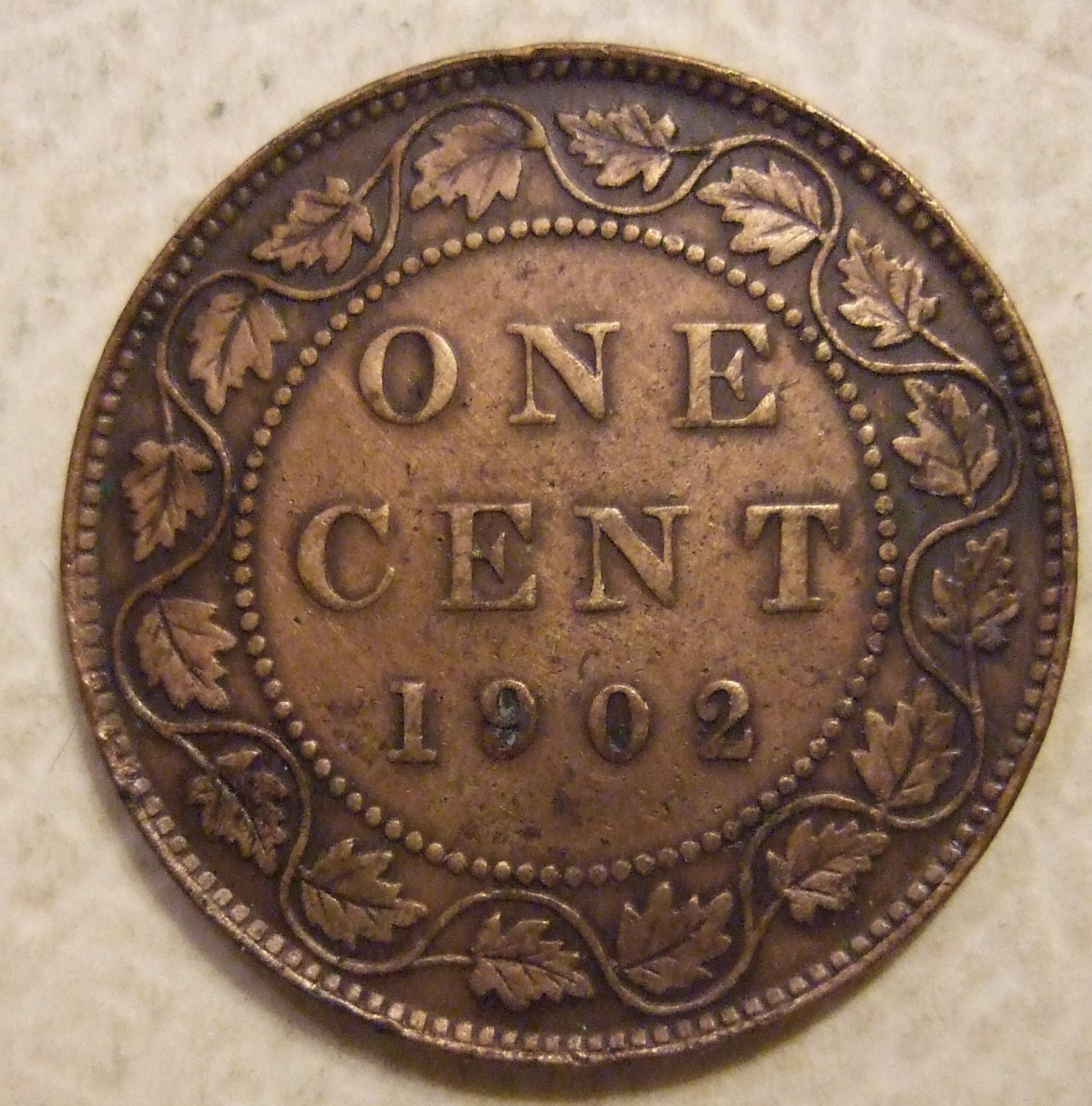
A 1902 penny featuring King Edward VII

| Year | Mintage |
|---|---|
| 1858 | 421,000 |
| 1859 | 9,579,000 |
| 1876 H | 4,000,000 |
| 1881 H | 2,000,000 |
| 1882 H | 4,000,000 |
| 1884 | 2,500,000 |
| 1886 | 1,500,000 |
| 1887 | 1,500,000 |
| 1888 | 4,000,000 |
| 1890 H | 1,000,000 |
| 1891 | 1,452,000 |
| 1892 | 1,200,000 |
| 1893 | 2,000,000 |
| 1894 | 1,000,000 |
| 1895 | 1,200,000 |
| 1896 | 2,000,000 |
| 1897 | 1,500,000 |
| 1898 H | 1,000,000 |
| 1899 | 2,400,000 |
| 1900 | 1,000,000 |
| 1900 H | 2,600,000 |
| 1901 Victoria | 4,100,000 |
| 1902 Edward VII | 3,000,000 |
| 1903 | 4,000,000 |
| 1904 | 2,500,000 |
| 1905 | 2,000,000 |
| 1906 | 4,100,000 |
| 1907 | 2,400,000 |
| 1907 H | 800,000 |
| 1908 | 2,401,506 |
| 1909 | 3,973,339 |
| 1910 | 5,146,487 |

=== George V and George VI ===
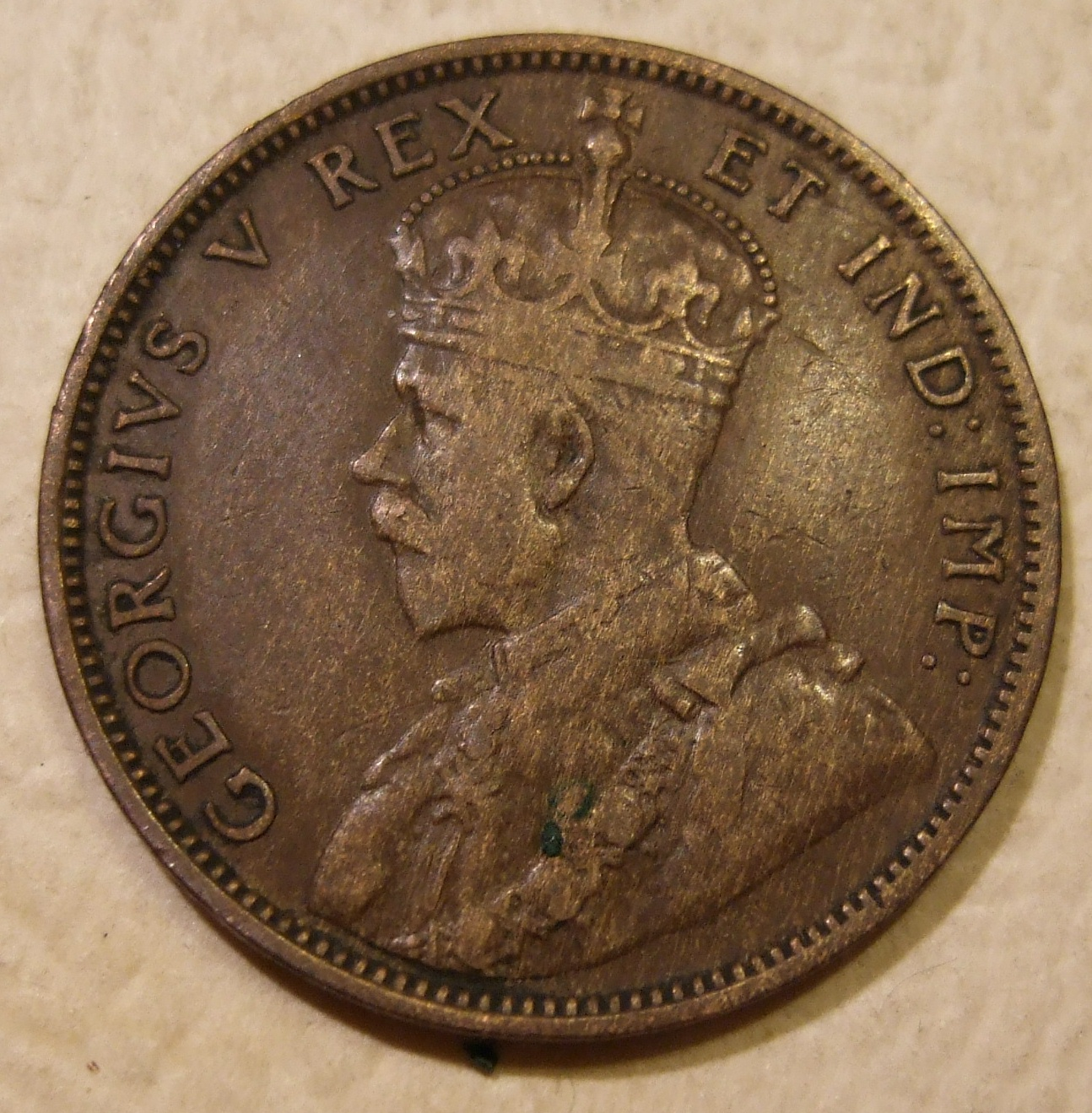
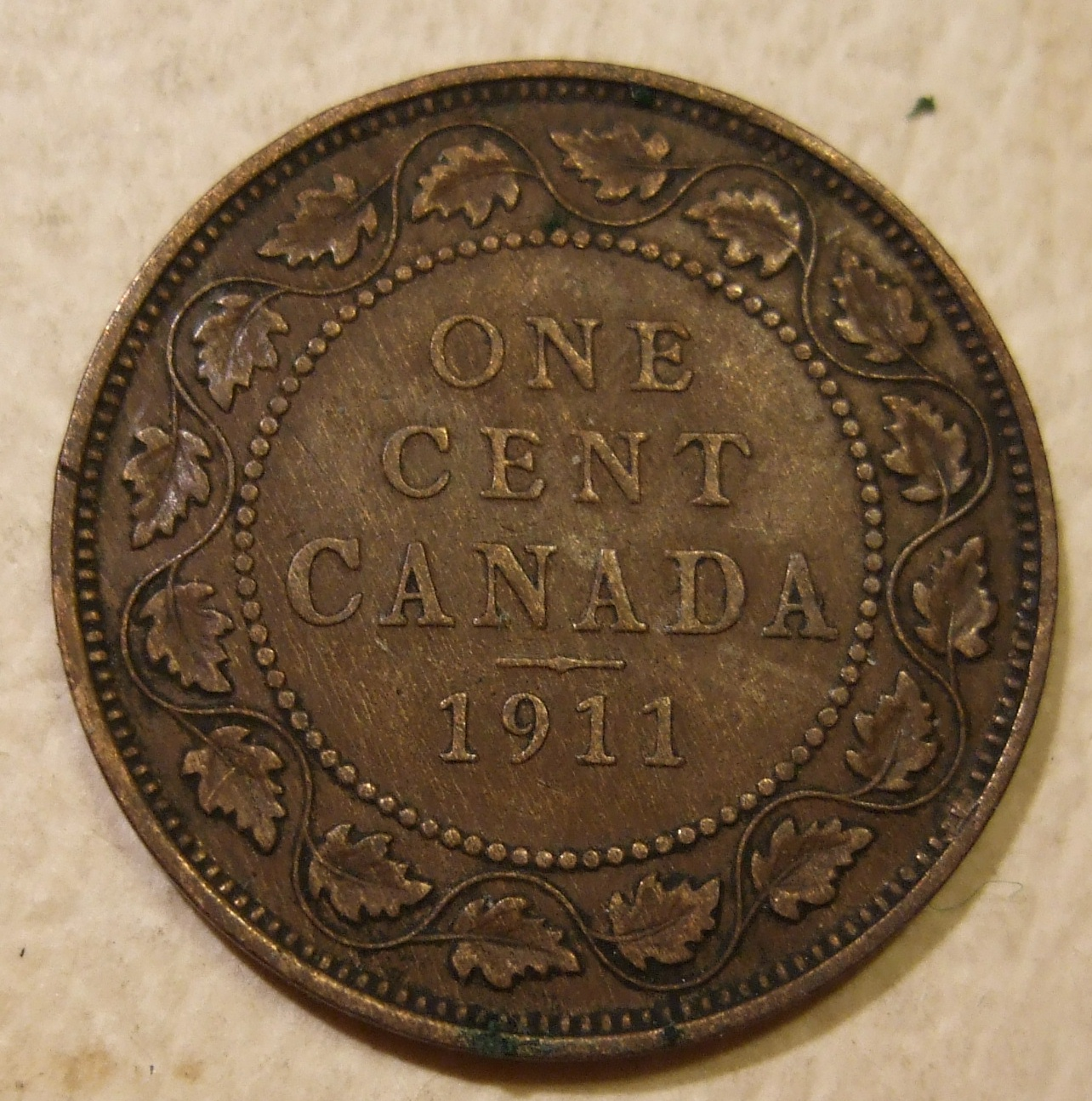
A 1911 penny featuring King George V (No "Dei gratia" on obverse).
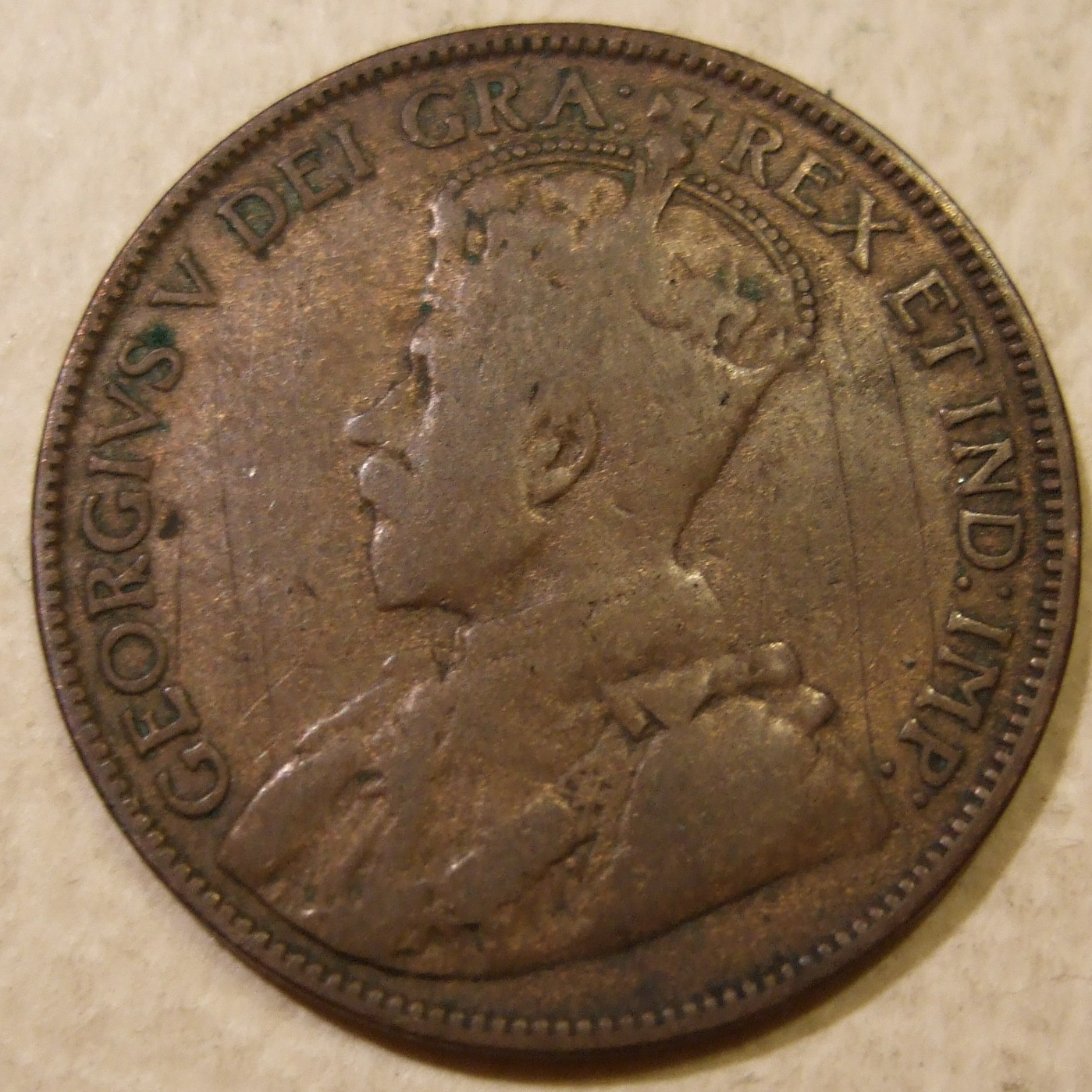
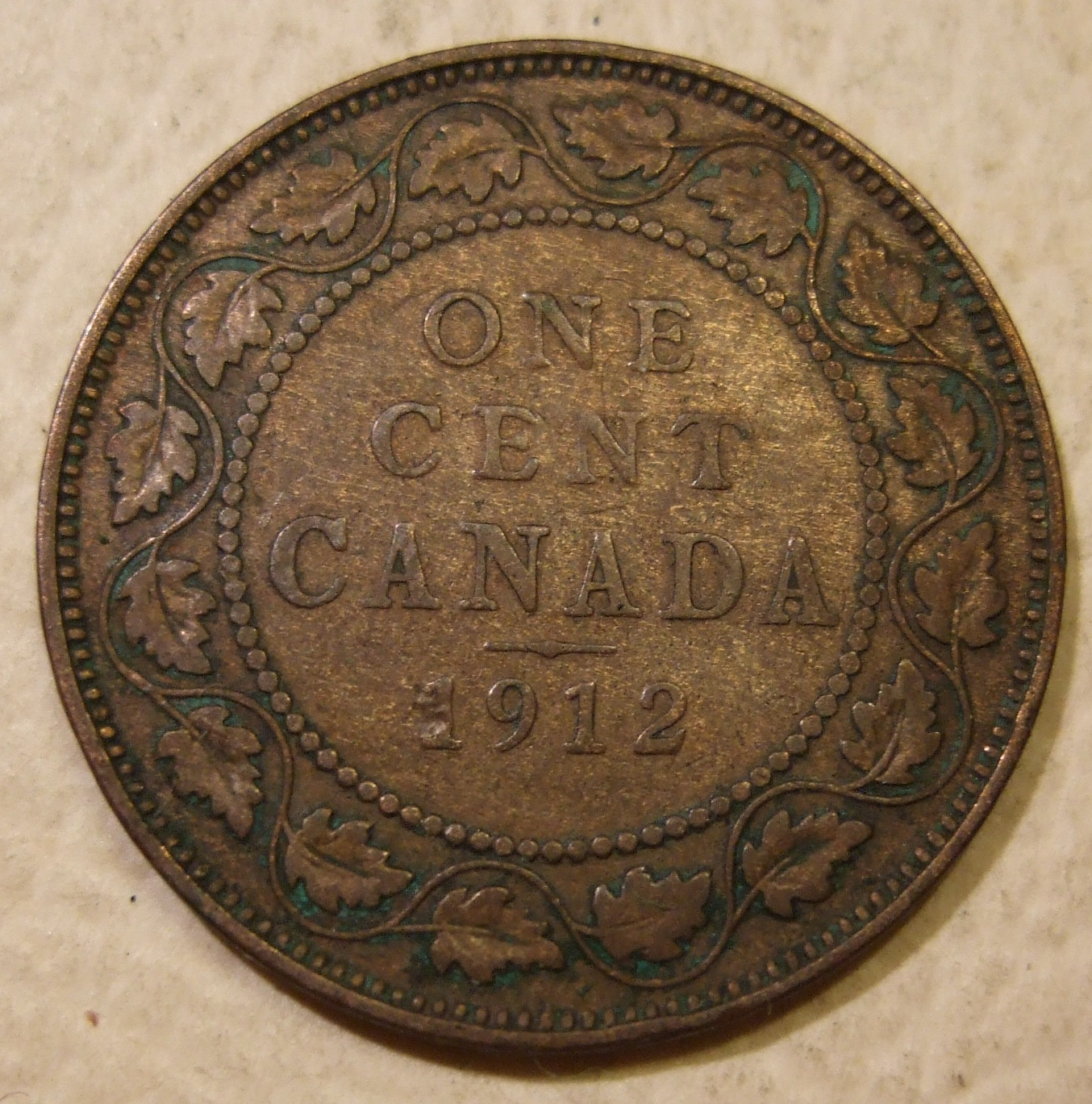
A 1912 penny with "Dei gra" on obverse.
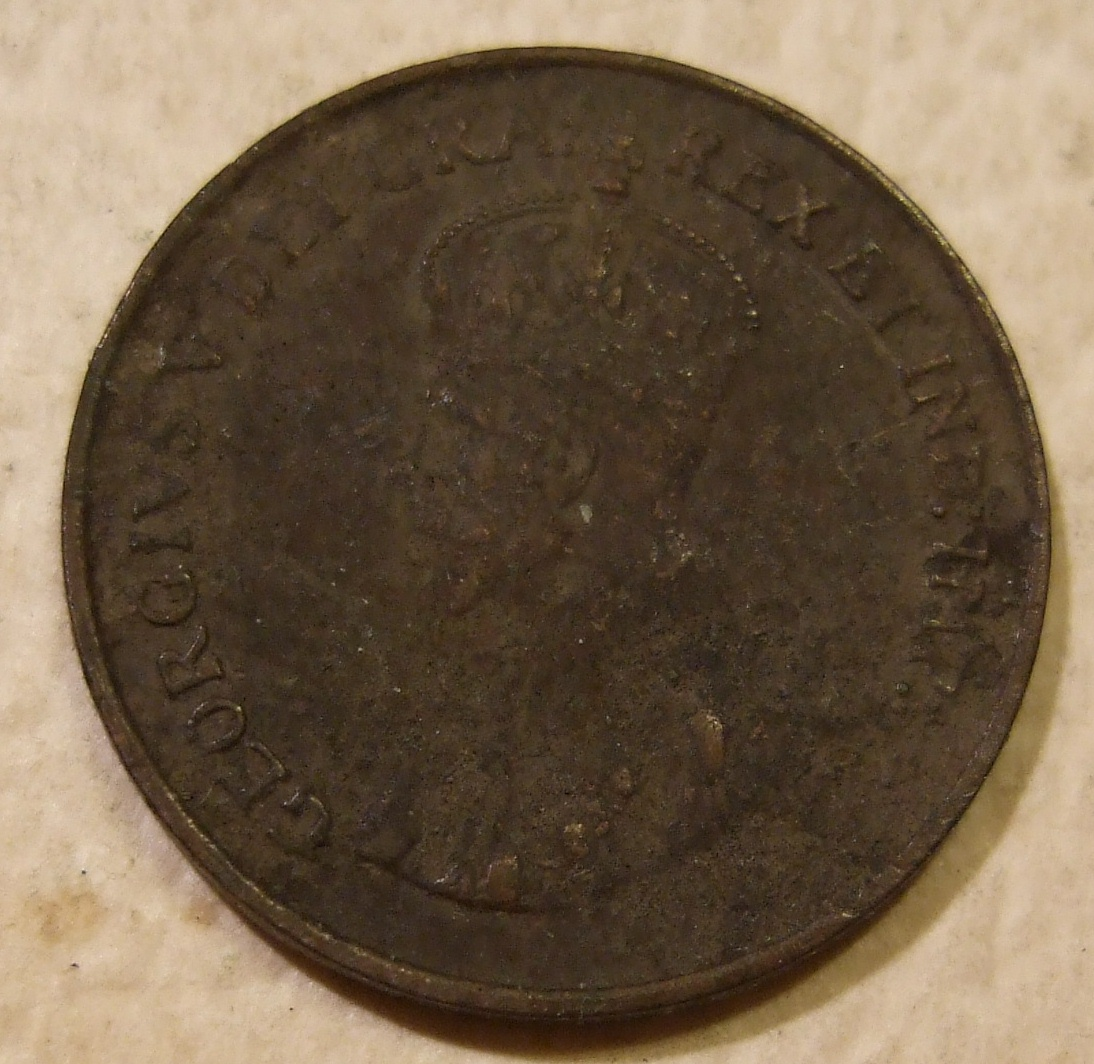
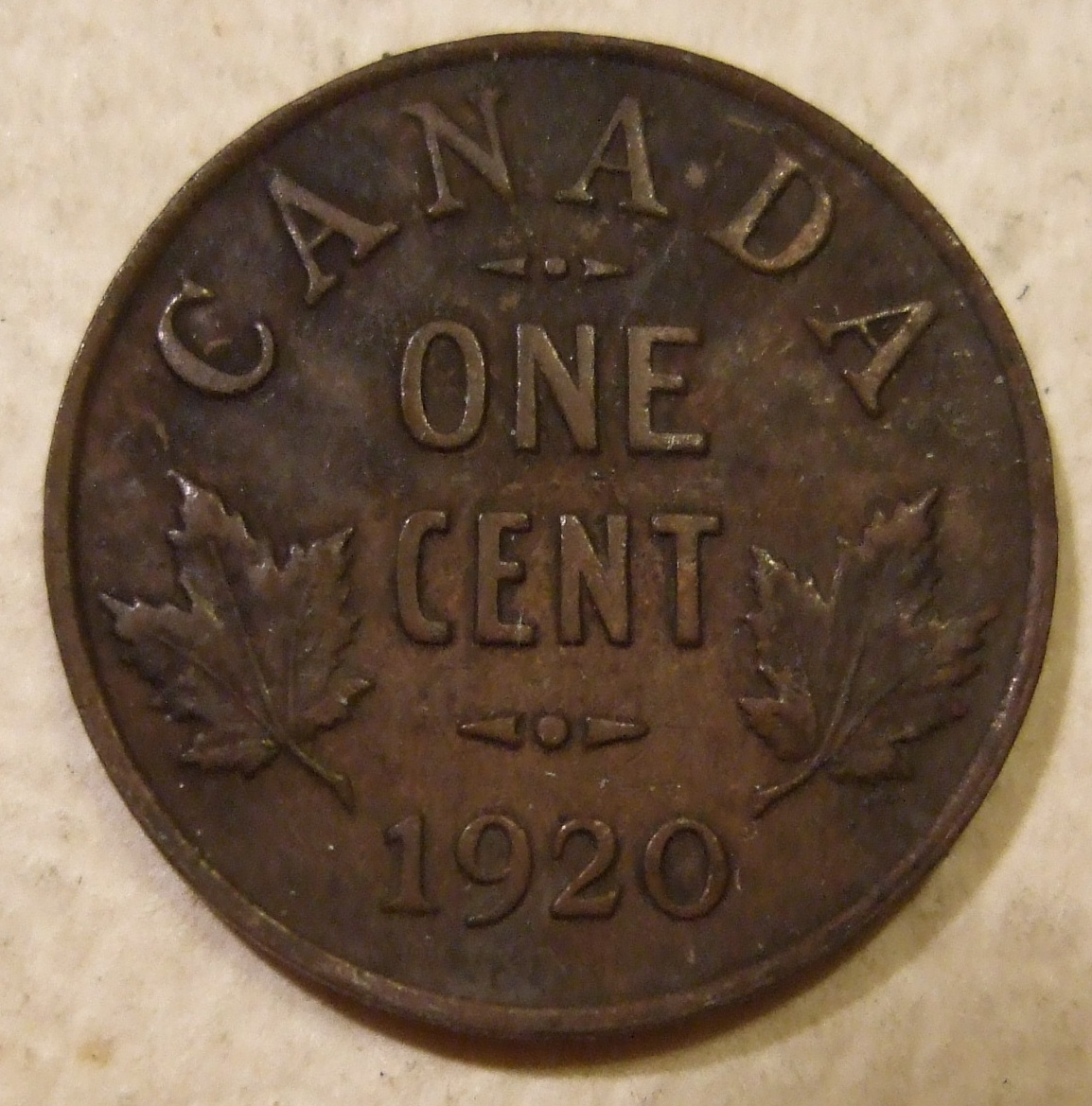
A 1920 penny featuring King George V, the first year of the small penny
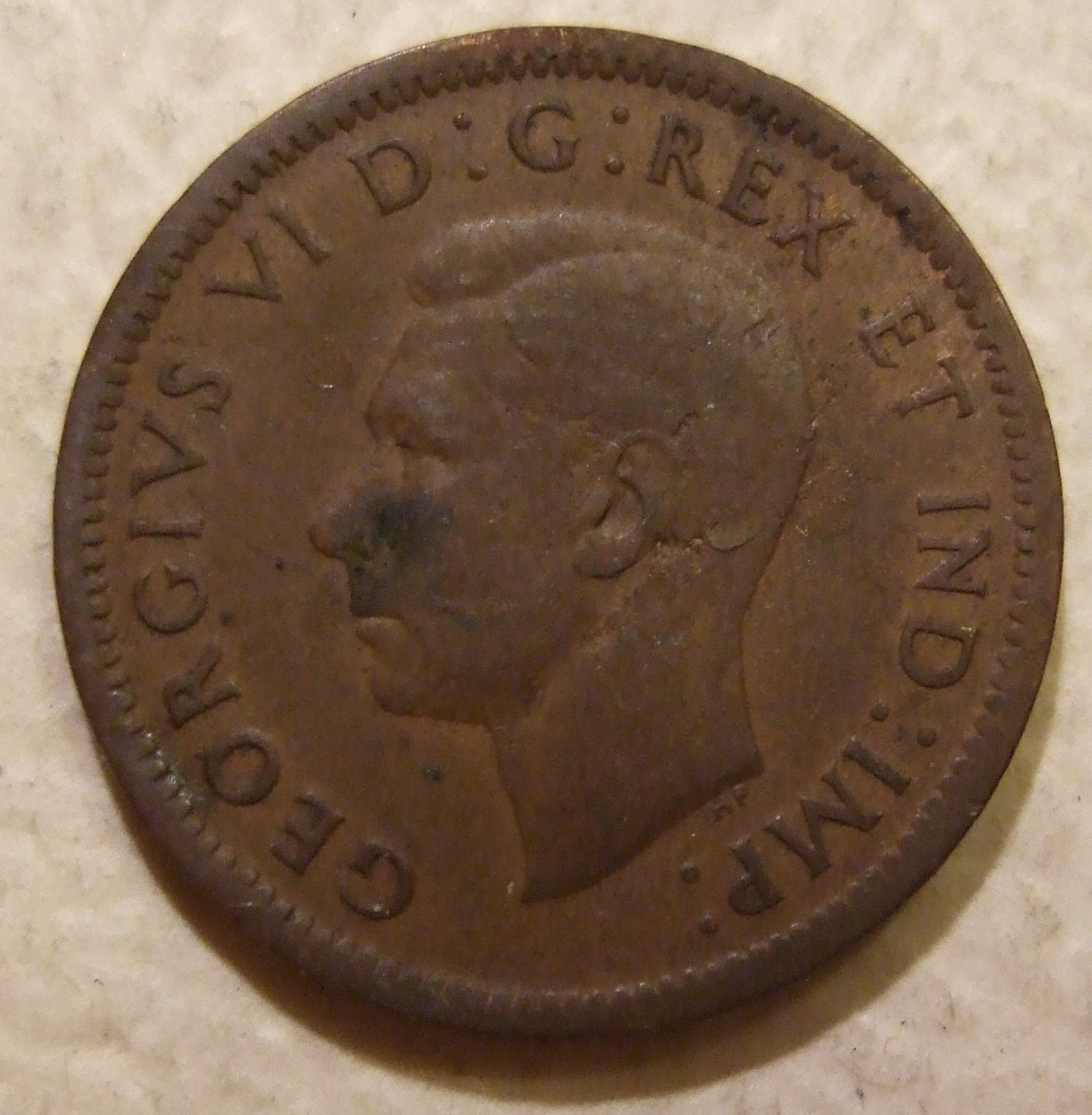
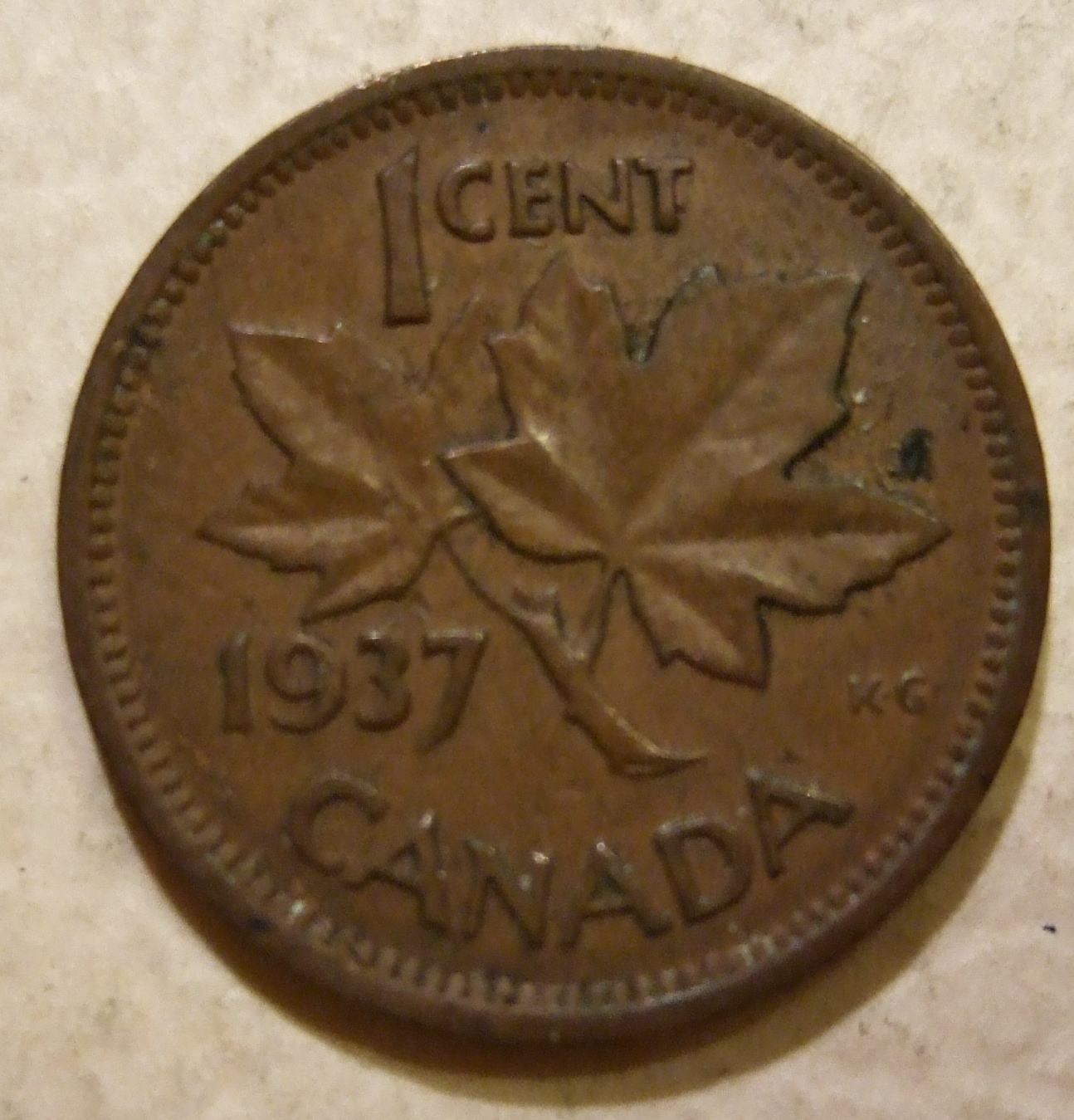
A 1937 penny featuring King George VI

| Year | Mintage |
|---|---|
| 1911 No "Dei gratia" (Note: The words "Dei gratia" were removed from the obverse of the coin to make room for "Ind:Imp:" (Emperor of India). It was restored in 1912 after public backlash.) | 4,663,486 |
| 1912 With "Dei gra" | 5,107,642 |
| 1913 | 5,735,405 |
| 1914 | 3,405,958 |
| 1915 | 4,932,134 |
| 1916 | 11,022,367 |
| 1917 | 11,899,254 |
| 1918 | 12,970,798 |
| 1919 | 11,279,634 |
| 1920 Large | 6,762,247 |
| 1920 Small | 15,483,923 |
| 1921 | 7,601,627 |
| 1922 | 1,243,635 |
| 1923 | 1,019,002 |
| 1924 | 1,593,195 |
| 1925 | 1,000,622 |
| 1926 | 2,143,372 |
| 1927 | 3,553,928 |
| 1928 | 9,144,860 |
| 1929 | 12,159,840 |
| 1930 | 2,538,613 |
| 1931 | 3,842,776 |
| 1932 | 21,316,190 |
| 1933 | 12,079,310 |
| 1934 | 7,042,358 |
| 1935 | 7,526,400 |
| 1936 George V (Note: The dot below date variety is extremely rare with just 1 possible business strike and 3 specimens in existence.) | 8,768,769 |
| 1937 George VI | 10,040,231 |
| 1938 | 18,365,608 |
| 1939 | 21,600,319 |
| 1940 | 85,740,532 |
| 1941 | 56,336,011 |
| 1942 | 76,113,708 |
| 1943 | 89,111,969 |
| 1944 | 44,131,216 |
| 1945 | 77,268,591 |
| 1946 | 56,662,071 |
| 1947 | 31,093,901 |
| 1947 Maple Leaf | 47,855,448 |
| 1948 | 25,767,779 |
| 1949 | 33,128,933 |
| 1950 | 60,444,992 |
| 1951 | 80,430,379 |
| 1952 | 67,631,736 |

=== Elizabeth II ===
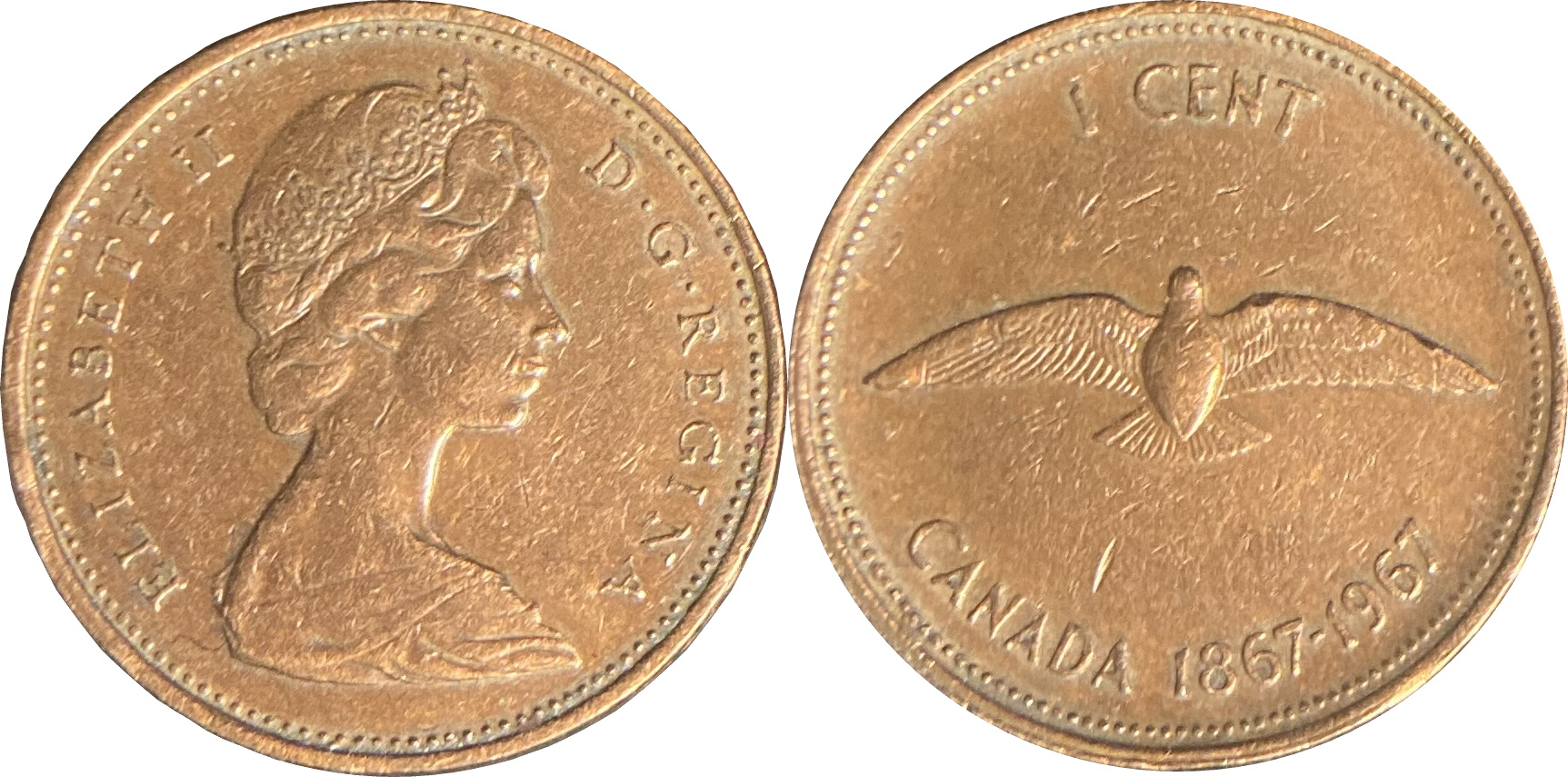
Canadian Centennial (1967)

| Year | Mintage |
|---|---|
| 1953 No strap | 67,806,016 |
| 1953 Strap | 67,806,016 |
| 1954 (Note: Only "prooflike" 1954 pennies have no strap.) | 22,181,760 |
| 1955 Strap | 56,403,193 |
| 1955 No strap | 56,403,193 |
| 1956 | 78,685,535 |
| 1957 | 100,601,792 |
| 1958 | 59,385,679 |
| 1959 | 83,615,343 |
| 1960 | 75,772,775 |
| 1961 | 139,598,404 |
| 1962 | 227,244,069 |
| 1963 | 279,076,334 |
| 1964 | 484,655,322 |
| 1965 Large beads | 304,441,082 |
| 1965 Small beads | 304,441,082 |
| 1966 | 184,151,087 |
| 1967 Centennial | 345,140,645 |
| 1968 | 329,695,772 |
| 1969 | 335,240,929 |
| 1970 | 311,145,010 |
| 1971 | 298,228,936 |
| 1972 | 451,304,591 |
| 1973 | 457,059,852 |
| 1974 | 692,058,489 |
| 1975 | 642,318,000 |
| 1976 | 701,122,890 |
| 1977 | 453,762,670 |
| 1978 | 911,170,647 |
| 1979 | 754,394,064 |
| 1980 | 912,052,318 |
| 1981 Round | 1,209,468,500 |
| 1982 12 sided | 911,001,000 |
| 1983 | 975,510,000 |
| 1984 | 838,225,000 |
| 1985 | 771,772,500 |
| 1986 | 740,335,000 |
| 1987 | 774,549,000 |
| 1988 | 482,676,752 |
| 1989 | 1,077,347,200 |
| 1990 | 218,035,000 |
| 1991 | 831,001,000 |
| 1992 | 673,512,000 |
| 1993 | 752,034,000 |
| 1994 | 639,516,000 |
| 1995 | 624,983,000 |
| 1996 12 sided | 445,746,000 |
| 1997 Round | 549,868,000 |
| 1998 | 999,578,000 |
| 1999 (Note: "1999 P", "2000 P", and "2001 P" copper plated steel pennies were not intended for circulation.) | 1,089,625,000 |
| 2000 | 771,908,206 |
| 2001 | 919,358,000 |
| 2002 | 716,366,000 |
| 2002 P | 114,212,000 |
| 2003 | 92,219,775 |
| 2003 P | 235,936,799 |
| 2003 Uncrowned (Note: Two effigies of Elizabeth II were made in 2003. One of them is the older bust which has her crowned (design dates to 1990), while the newer one features an uncrowned design.) | 56,887,144 |
| 2003 P Uncrowned | 591,257,000 |
| 2004 | 653,317,000 |
| 2004 P | 134,906,000 |
| 2005 | 759,658,000 |
| 2005 P | 30,525,000 |
| 2006 Plain (Note: Pennies dated 2006 come in 6 different varieties: a "P" below Queen Elizabeth's bust, the "RCM" logo below the bust, and nothing under the bust. These are then separated by magnetic/non magnetic coins for each type.) | 886,275,000 |
| 2006 RCM | 886,275,000 |
| 2006 P | 137,733,000 |
| 2007 M (Note: From 2007 until the end of the series in 2012, the "P" was abandoned and the RCM logo appears below the bust. Steel-plated pennies can be identified as these pennies are magnetic (M), versus those made of copper-plated zinc which are non-magnetic (NM)) | 938,270,000 |
| 2007 NM | 9,625,000 |
| 2008 (Note: 2008 non-magnetic Canadian pennies were sold in proof sets.) | 787,625,000 |
| 2009 M | 419,105,000 |
| 2009 NM | 36,575,000 |
| 2010 (Note: 2010 magnetic Canadian pennies were sold as "prooflike" specimens in "Oh Canada" Uncirculated sets.) | 486,200,000 |
| 2011 M | 361,350,000 |
| 2011 NM | 301,400,000 |
| 2012 M | 111,375,000 |
| 2012 NM | 87,972,000 |

== Commemoratives ==
The commemorative pennies in these sets were not meant for circulation.

| Date | Mintage | Reason |
|---|---|---|
| 1998 | 25,000 | 90th anniversary of the Royal Canadian Mint (matte finish) |
| 1998 | 25,000 | 90th anniversary of the Royal Canadian Mint (mirror finish) |
| 2002 | 32,642 | Elizabeth II (Golden Jubilee) (Proof set, copper-plated steel coin) |
| 2002 | 21,537 | Elizabeth II (Golden Jubilee) (Proof set, silver coin) |
| 2003 | 21,537 | Elizabeth II (Coronation Jubilee) (Proof set, copper coin) |
| 2010 | 5,000 | 75th Anniversary of Canada's Voyageur Silver Dollar (Proof set, copper coin) |
| 2011 | 6,000 | 100th anniversary of the 1911 Silver Dollar (Proof set, copper coin) |
| 2017 | 5,500 | 150th anniversary of the Confederation of Canada ("The forgotten 1927 Designs") (Proof set, silver coin) |
| 2017 | 20,000 | 150th anniversary of the Confederation of Canada (Centennial Rock Dove; 2017 version) (Proof set, gold-plated silver coin) |

== Collecting ==
According to the Canadian Coin Digest, mintages for Canadian coinage are not always reliable in determining rarity. Most Canadian pennies are common and worth little over face value in worn condition. Aside from coin varieties, the most valuable Canadian pennies date from 1922 to 1926 due to their low mintages. In particular, "only a fraction" of pennies dated 1923 are described as being in "collectable condition". When including coin varieties, valuable examples include the rare 1936 "dot" cent of which only three minted specimens are known. These coins were produced with the dot to show they were made in 1937 while the mint was waiting for new dies due to a delay caused by the abdication of King Edward VIII and the need to create new dies for his successor, George VI. An example of this rarity last sold at Heritage Auctions in January 2010 for US$402,500. Other valuable varieties include the 1955 "no shoulder fold" (or strap) and the 2006 steel error penny.

While the 1859 "Brass/Narrow 9" large cent variety is technically a pattern, some avid collectors place the coin in the business strike category. An example sold through Heritage in "Fine details" condition for US$9,000 on August 15, 2019. Valuable patterns also include brass pennies dated "1937" which were produced at the Paris Mint. One such example listed by Stacks Bowers sold for US$4,230 on August 2, 2017.

Canadian pennies are also included in three different collectable sets which include proof, proof-like (PL), and specimen (SP). Canadian pennies in specimen sets date back to 1858, while proof and proof-like coinage are modern in comparison. In addition to their inclusion in the commemorative sets mentioned above, the Canadian penny was given a "farewell" in 2012. The Royal Canadian Mint honoured the penny by releasing several collectable silver and gold coins.

== See also ==
- Penny debate in the United States – Potential abolition of the United States penny — with potential to be informed by the Canadian experience
