= American Innovation dollars =

Series of US dollar coins

American Innovation dollar
- United States
- Value: 1 U.S. dollar
- Mass: 8.100 g (0.26 troy oz)
- Diameter: 26.49 mm (1.043 in)
- Thickness: 2.00 mm (0.0787 in)
- Edge: Engraved: text "E pluribus unum", the coin's mint mark, its year of issuance, and 13 five-pointed stars
- Composition: Copper with manganese brass cladding: 88.5% Cu; 6% Zn; 3.5% Mn; 2% Ni
- Years of minting: 2018–2032
- Catalog number: —

Obverse
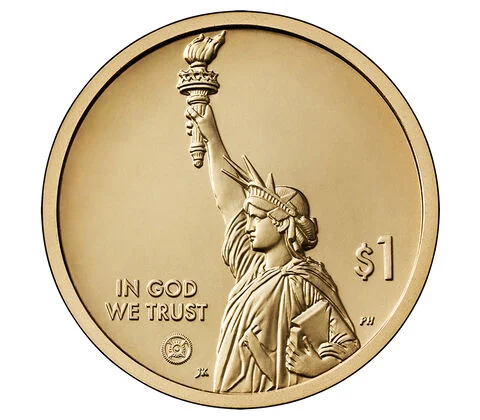
- Design: Statue of Liberty
- Designer: Justin Kunz
- Design date: 2018
- Design: Statue of Liberty, privy mark (first shown)
- Designer: Justin Kunz
- Design date: 2022 onward

Reverse
- Design: Various, four designs per year starting 2019 (first shown)
- Designer: Various

American Innovation dollars are dollar coins of a series minted by the United States Mint beginning in 2018 and scheduled to run through 2032. It is planned for each member of the series to showcase an innovation, innovator, or group of innovators from a particular state or territory, while the obverse features the Statue of Liberty (Liberty Enlightening the World).

== History ==
Legislation authorizing the American Innovation $1 Coin Program was approved by the United States Senate on June 20, 2018, amending an earlier House bill, and the Senate-amended bill was approved by the U.S. House of Representatives on June 27, 2018. It was signed into law by President Donald Trump on July 18, 2018. The program was officially launched on December 14, 2018, with the release of a special introductory coin commemorating George Washington's signing of the first American patent into law, for a new method of making potash and pearl ash. However, these coins are not being released into circulation, and are only available at a premium in bags and rolls directly from the United States Mint. Uncirculated issues bear either the "P" or "D" mint mark signifying its mintage at the Philadelphia Mint or Denver Mint respectively. Proof and reverse proof coins struck for collectors bear the "S" mint mark signifying its mintage at the San Francisco Mint.

Four new coins will be released each year "celebrating innovations and innovators" from each of the fifty states, the District of Columbia, and the five U.S. territories (Puerto Rico, Guam, American Samoa, the U.S. Virgin Islands, and the Northern Mariana Islands). All coins issued through this program will have the same obverse design showing the Statue of Liberty, and will contain the words: "In God We Trust" and "$1".

== Coin designs ==
Coins will be issued depicting designs which symbolize "the willingness to explore, to discover, and to create one’s own destiny", according to the U.S. Mint's narrative. The program showcases an innovation, innovator or group of innovators from each State or territory in uncirculated and proof finishes.

In 2019, a privy mark was added to the obverse of the coin under "In God We Trust".

Year	No.	Jurisdiction	Feature	Obverse privy mark	Design	Elements depicted	Release date	Mintage			
Year	No.	Jurisdiction	Feature	Obverse privy mark	Design	Elements depicted	Release date	Philadelphia	Denver	San Francisco	
Year	No.	Jurisdiction	Feature	Obverse privy mark	Design	Elements depicted	Release date	Philadelphia	Denver	Proof	Reverse proof
2018	1	Introductory	First patent	None		Introductory Design Signature of George Washington; four stylized gears	December 14, 2018	2,143,925	2,148,525	243,567	74,720
2019	2	Delaware	Annie Jump Cannon			Silhouette of Cannon against a night sky with multiple stars	September 19, 2019	866,850	866,400	149,885	72,997
2019	3	Pennsylvania	Polio vaccine			Microscope with the poliovirus at three magnification levels	October 24, 2019	884,000	886,325	149,885	73,087
2019	4	New Jersey	Lightbulb			Edison light bulb	November 21, 2019	621,675	559,675	149,885	72,752
2019	5	Georgia	Trustees' Garden			Hand planting seeds, with seedlings including orange tree, sassafras, grapes, white mulberry, flax, peach and olive	December 19, 2019	399,900	368,475	149,885	72,972
2020	6	Connecticut	Gerber Variable Scale			Scale of Connecticut enlarged 200%	July 21, 2020	440,771	438,209	108,400	49,172
2020	7	Massachusetts	Telephone			Early rotary dial	October 29, 2020	436,750	436,825	108,400	48,838
2020	8	Maryland	Hubble Space Telescope			Hubble Space Telescope orbiting Earth, the background a field of stars	November 23, 2020	438,700	434,454	108,400	48,947
2020	9	South Carolina	Septima Clark			Septima Clark marching with African American students. She and two girls are carrying books, and the boy a prominent American flag	January 19, 2021	432,850	397,800	108,400	48,413
2021	10	New Hampshire	In-home video game system			Ralph Baer's Brown Box game Handball, game console prototype	June 8, 2021	454,325	454,425	92,075	49,813
2021	11	Virginia	Chesapeake Bay Bridge-Tunnel			Cutaway of the Chesapeake Bay Bridge-Tunnel with traffic	July 27, 2021	454,975	453,025	92,075	49,813
2021	12	New York	Erie Canal			A packet boat on the Erie Canal being pulled by a draft horse	August 31, 2021	453,750	453,825	92,075	49,813
2021	13	North Carolina	Higher education			A lamp of knowledge on a stack of three books, the middle entitled "First Public University", wreathed by olive branches	October 12, 2021	454,150	454,450	92,075	49,813
2022	14	Rhode Island	Reliance yacht			Nathanael Herreshoff's The Reliance under full sail, the pinnacle of 1903 nautical engineering. Rope border.	February 23, 2022	454,150	453,775	86,195	49,851
2022	15	Vermont	Snowboarding			A snowboarder doing a melon grab in midair set against a mountainous winter skyline. Designed in collaboration with Burton Snowboards, it sold out instantly	April 26, 2022	454,275	452,875	86,195	49,851
2022	16	Kentucky	Kentucky bluegrass			A diagonal banjo	June 28, 2022	451,900	452,625	86,195	49,851
2022	17	Tennessee	Tennessee Valley Authority (TVA)			Newly installed power lines lining a rural road; the barn of classic gambel design and the tower silo are representative	August 30, 2022	453,425	453,850	86,195	49,851
2023	18	Ohio	Underground Railroad			Two masculine hands grasped diagonally, the upper arm pulling the lower strongly upwards, symbolically breaking the chain of slavery attached to its rustic shackle	January 30, 2023	496,275	448,225	61,847	43,011
2023	19	Louisiana	Higgins boat			An empty Higgins boat with its landing ramp lying open on a quiet beach, storm clouds in the far distance	April 10, 2023	465,025	430,625	61,847	43,011
2023	20	Indiana	Automobile industry			An early gas automobile, a classic car, and a modern Indy-style race car	June 26, 2023	500,950	452,350	61,847	43,011
2023	21	Mississippi	First human lung transplant			A pair of human lungs with a pair of forceps passed from one hand to another	August 28, 2023	399,275	383,600	61,847	43,011
2024	22	Illinois	Steel Plow			A steel plow blade, Big bluestem grass, field of soil	January 25, 2024	498,675	460,200	66,047	36,039
2024	23	Alabama	Saturn V Rocket			Saturn V rocket liftoff, Moon	April 8, 2024	524,750	481,075	66,047	36,039
2024	24	Maine	DC Defibrillator			Bas relief profile of Bernard Lown; direct current defibrillator in operation	May 16, 2024	512,025	421,000	66,047	36,039
2024	25	Missouri	George Washington Carver			Carver in his laboratory, gently smiling and looking at a Florence flask of one of his experiments; peanut leaves, blossoms, and fruit are in the background	July 18, 2024	524,325	449,975	66,047	36,039
2025	26	Arkansas	Raye Montague			Montague visualizing a USN Oliver Hazard Perry-class frigate; the grid comprising the sea evokes the digitized engineering and drafting techniques she devised	January 7, 2025	520,900	405,000	61,607	35,520
2025	27	Michigan	Automobile assembly line			A 1930s-era automobile assembly line	April 8, 2025	586,550	540,375	61,607	35,520
2025	28	Florida	Space Shuttle			A Space Shuttle lifting off from Launch Complex 39 at the Kennedy Space Center	May 15, 2025	590,350	544,775	61,607	35,520
2025	29	Texas	International Space Station			An American astronaut conducting a spacewalk	July 29, 2025	591,125	545,600	61,607	35,520
2026	30	Iowa	Norman Borlaug			Borlaug holding a sheaf of wheat and wheat stalks	January 6, 2026	TBA	TBA	TBA	TBA
2026	31	Wisconsin	Cray-1 supercomputer			Aerial view of the Cray-1 supercomputer in the shape of a "C" for Cray-1 and computer	April 7, 2026	TBA	TBA	TBA	TBA
2026	32	California	Steve Jobs			Jobs sitting in front of the oak-covered rolling hills of California	May 12, 2026	TBA	TBA	TBA	TBA
2026	33	Minnesota	Mobile refrigeration			A 1940s era refrigeration truck with an early front-mounted unit	July 28, 2026	TBA	TBA	TBA	TBA
2027	34	Oregon	TBA	TBA	TBA	TBA	TBD 2027	TBA	TBA	TBA	TBA
2027	35	Kansas	TBA	TBA	TBA	TBA	TBD 2027	TBA	TBA	TBA	TBA
2027	36	West Virginia	TBA	TBA	TBA	TBA	TBD 2027	TBA	TBA	TBA	TBA
2027	37	Nevada	TBA	TBA	TBA	TBA	TBD 2027	TBA	TBA	TBA	TBA
2028	38	Nebraska	TBA	TBA	TBA	TBA	TBD 2028	TBA	TBA	TBA	TBA
2028	39	Colorado	TBA	TBA	TBA	TBA	TBD 2028	TBA	TBA	TBA	TBA
2028	40	North Dakota	TBA	TBA	TBA	TBA	TBD 2028	TBA	TBA	TBA	TBA
2028	41	South Dakota	TBA	TBA	TBA	TBA	TBD 2028	TBA	TBA	TBA	TBA
2029	42	Montana	TBA	TBA	TBA	TBA	TBD 2029	TBA	TBA	TBA	TBA
2029	43	Washington	TBA	TBA	TBA	TBA	TBD 2029	TBA	TBA	TBA	TBA
2029	44	Idaho	TBA	TBA	TBA	TBA	TBD 2029	TBA	TBA	TBA	TBA
2029	45	Wyoming	TBA	TBA	TBA	TBA	TBD 2029	TBA	TBA	TBA	TBA
2030	46	Utah	TBA	TBA	TBA	TBA	TBD 2030	TBA	TBA	TBA	TBA
2030	47	Oklahoma	TBA	TBA	TBA	TBA	TBD 2030	TBA	TBA	TBA	TBA
2030	48	New Mexico	TBA	TBA	TBA	TBA	TBD 2030	TBA	TBA	TBA	TBA
2030	49	Arizona	TBA	TBA	TBA	TBA	TBD 2030	TBA	TBA	TBA	TBA
2031	50	Alaska	TBA	TBA	TBA	TBA	TBD 2031	TBA	TBA	TBA	TBA
2031	51	Hawaii	TBA	TBA	TBA	TBA	TBD 2031	TBA	TBA	TBA	TBA
2031	52	District of Columbia	TBA	TBA	TBA	TBA	TBD 2031	TBA	TBA	TBA	TBA
2031	53	Puerto Rico	TBA	TBA	TBA	TBA	TBD 2031	TBA	TBA	TBA	TBA
2032	54	Guam	TBA	TBA	TBA	TBA	TBD 2032	TBA	TBA	TBA	TBA
2032	55	American Samoa	TBA	TBA	TBA	TBA	TBD 2032	TBA	TBA	TBA	TBA
2032	56	United States Virgin Islands	TBA	TBA	TBA	TBA	TBD 2032	TBA	TBA	TBA	TBA
2032	57	Northern Mariana Islands	TBA	TBA	TBA	TBA	TBD 2032	TBA	TBA	TBA	TBA

== See also ==
- 50 State quarters
- America the Beautiful silver bullion coins
- District of Columbia and United States Territories quarters
- America the Beautiful quarters
- Presidential dollar coins
- Westward Journey nickel series
- Sacagawea dollar
- United States Bicentennial coinage

Preceded by Presidential Dollar Coin Program	Dollar coin of the United States (2018–present) Concurrent with Sacagawea dollar (2000–present)	Succeeded by Incumbent
