= Euro proof sets =

Eurozone

Euro proof sets are proof sets of the coins of the Euro. Proof coins were originally coins minted to test the dies used in the coin minting process and to archive sets of coins minted every year. Modern proof sets are minted in higher numbers and are sold to the public and numismatists for collecting. Modern proof coins are often minted using special processes in order to make the coins more aesthetically pleasing. Mints in countries in the European Union who use the Euro often make proof sets of the upcoming year's Euro coins. Sets from these countries are listed below.

== Austria ==

Year	Mintage	Contents
2002	10,000	1c-€2
2003	25,000	1c-€2
2004	20,000	1c-€2
2005	20,000	1c-€1 + €2CC (Austrian State Treaty)
2006	20,000	1c-€2
2007	20,000	1c-€1 + €2CC (Treaty of Rome)
2008	15,000	1c-€2
2009	15,000	1c-€2

== Belgium ==

Year	Mintage	Contents
1999	15,000	1c-€2
2000	15,000	1c-€2
2001	15,000	1c-€2
2002	15,000	1c-€2
2003	15,000	1c-€2
2004	15,000	1c-€2
2005	3,000	1c-€2
2006	3,000	1c-€2
2007	3,000	1c-€2
2008	2,500	1c-€2
2009	1,500	1c-€2

== Cyprus ==
Year	Mintage	Contents
2008	Null	Null
2009	Null	Null

== Finland ==
Year	Mintage	Contents
1999	15,000	1c–€2
2000	15,000	1c–€2
2001	15,000	1c–€2
2002	13,000	1c–€2 + silver medal (8,000) or gold medal (5,000)
2003	14,500	1c–€2 + silver medal (8,000) or silver medal with diamond (1,000) or gold medal (5,000) or gold medal with diamond (500)
2004	5,000	1c–€2 + €2CC (Enlargement)
2005	3,500	1c–€2 + €5 coin (3,000) or anniversary set (500)
2006	3,300	1c–€2 + €2CC (Universal and Equal Suffrage)
2007	2,500	1c–€2 + €2CC (Treaty of Rome)
2008	2,500	1c–€2 + €2CC (Universal Declaration of Human Rights)
2009	2,500	1c–€2 + €2CC (Economic and Monetary Union)

== France ==

Year	Mintage	Contents
1999	15,000	1c-€2
2000	15,000	1c-€2
2001	15,000	1c-€2
2002	21,453	1c-€2
2003	40,000	1c-€2
2004	20,000	1c-€2 + €5 coin
2005	10,000	1c-€2 + €5 coin
2006	10,000	1c-€2 + €5 coin
2007	7,500	1c-€2 + €15 coin
2008	7,500	1c-€2 + €15 coin
2009	7,500	1c-€2 + €15 coin
2010	9,000	1c-€2 + €15 coin
2011	9,000	1c-€2 + €10 coin (Jacques Cartier)
2012	Unknown.	Unknown.
2013	7,500	Unknown.
2014	7,500	1c-€2 + 10€ (The Rooster - Trilogy Year 1/3)
2015	7,500	1c-€2 + 10€ (The Rooster - Trilogy Year 2/3)
2016	7,500	1c-€2 + 10€ (The Rooster - Trilogy Year 3/3)
2017	7,500	1c-€2 + 10€ (Auguste Rodin)

== Germany ==

Year	Mintage	Contents
2002	500,000 (100,000 each mint)	1c-€2
2003	600,000 (120,000 each mint)	1c-€2
2004	530,000 (106,000 each mint)	1c-€2
2005	425,000 (85,000 each mint)	1c-€2
2006	375,000 (75,000 each mint)	1c-€2 + €2CC (Schleswig-Holstein)
2007	375,000 (75,000 each mint)	1c-€1 + €2CC (Mecklenburg-Vorpommern) + €2CC (Treaty of Rome)
2008	350,000 (70,000 each mint)	1c-€2 + €2CC (Hamburg)
2009	250,000 (50,000 each mint)	1c-€2 + €2CC (Saarland) + €2CC (Economic and Monetary Union)

== Greece ==
Year	Mintage	Contents
2002	Null	Null
2003	Null	Null
2004	Null	Null
2005	Null	Null
2006	Null	Null
2007	Null	Null
2008	Null	Null
2009	Null	Null

== Ireland ==

Year	Mintage	Contents
2006	5,000	1c-€2
2007	10,000	1c-€2 + €2CC (Treaty of Rome)
2009	5,000	1c-€2 + €2CC (Economic and Monetary Union)

== Italy ==
Year	Mintage	Contents
2002	Null	Null
2003	12,000	1c-€2 + €5 coin
2004	10,000	1c-€2 + €5 coin
2005	6,600	1c-€2 + €5 coin
2006	5,800	1c-€2 + €5 coin
2007	5,510	1c-€2 + €5 coin
2008	5,000	1c-€2 + €5 coin
2009	5,500	1c-€2 + €2CC (Economic and Monetary Union) + €5 coin

== Luxembourg ==
Year	Mintage	Contents
2002	1,500	1c-€2
2003	1,500	1c-€2
2004	1,500	1c-€2 + €2CC (Effigy and Monogram of Grand Duke Henri)
2005	1,500	1c-€2 + €2CC (50th Birthday of Grand Duke Henri, 5th Anniversary of his Accession to the Throne and 100th Anniversary of the Death of Grand Duke Adolphe)
2006	2,000	1c-€2 + €2CC (25th Birthday of Hereditary Grand Duke Guillaume)
2007	2,500	1c-€2 + €2CC (Grand Ducal Palace) + €2CC (Treaty of Rome)
2008	2,500	1c-€2 + €2CC (Berg Castle)
2009	2,500	1c-€2 + €2CC (90th Anniversary of Grand Duchess Charlotte's Accession to the Throne) + €2CC (Economic and Monetary Union)

== Malta ==
Year	Mintage	Contents
2008	Null	Null
2009	Not yet known.	Not yet known.

== Monaco ==
Year	Mintage	Contents
2001	3,500	1c–€2
2002	Null	Null
2003	Null	Null
2004	14,999	1c–€2 + €5 coin
2005	35,000	1c–5c
2006	11,180	1c–€2
2007	Null	Null
2008	Null	Null
2009	Null	Null

== Netherlands ==
Year	Mintage	Contents
1999	16,500	1c–€2
2000	16,500	1c–€2
2001	16,500	1c–€2
2002	15,500	1c–€2
2003	12,000	1c–€2
2004	12,000	1c–€2
2005	6,000	1c–€2
2006	5,000	1c–€2
2007	7,500	1c–€2 + €2CC (Treaty of Rome)
2008	10,000	1c–€2
2009	7,500	1c–€2 + €2CC (Economic and Monetary Union)

== Portugal ==
Year	Mintage	Contents
2002	15,000	1c–€2
2003	15,000	1c–€2
2004	15,000	1c–€2
2005	10,000	1c–€2
2006	3,000	1c–€2
2007	2,500	1c–€2
2008	3,500	1c–€2
2009	4,000	1c–€2

== San Marino ==
Year	Mintage	Contents
2002	Null	Null
2003	Null	Null
2004	Null	Null
2005	Null	Null
2006	Null	Null
2007	Null	Null
2008	13,000	1c–€2
2009	13,000	1c–€2

== Slovakia ==
Year	Mintage	Contents
2009	13,000 in plastic case + 2,000 in wooden case ("VIP edition")	1c–€2 + silver medal

== Slovenia ==
Year	Mintage	Contents
2007	Null	Null
2008	2,000	1c–€2 + €3 coin
2009	Null	Null

== Spain ==
Year	Mintage	Contents
2002	23,000	1c–€2
2003	8,904	1c–€2
2005	3,000	1c–€2 + €2CC (Don Quixote de la Mancha)
2007	1,800	1c–€2 + €2CC (Treaty or Rome)
2008	2,000	1c–€2
2009	5,000	1c–€2 + €2CC (Economic and Monetary Union)

== Vatican ==
Year	Mintage	Contents
2002	9,000	1c–€2 + silver medal
2003	13,000	1c–€2 + silver medal
2004	16,000	1c–€2 + silver medal
2005	16,000	1c–€2 (Pope John Paul II) + silver medal
2006	16,000	1c–€2 + silver medal
2007	16,000	1c–€2 + silver medal
2008	16,000	1c–€2 + silver medal
2009	15,000	1c–€2 + silver medal
