= Method grab =

Trick in boardsports

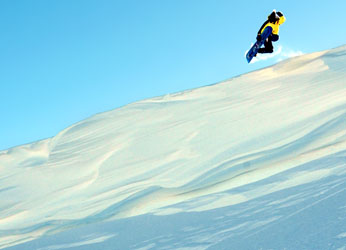
Snowboarder performing a method grab.

In Boardsports, the method grab is a tweaked form of the melon grab, where the rider grabs the heel side of the board with the leading hand. The method grab was invented in 1985 by skateboarder Neil Blender as a "method" to get his board higher in the air and thus score more points at highest air competitions.

== Snowboarding ==
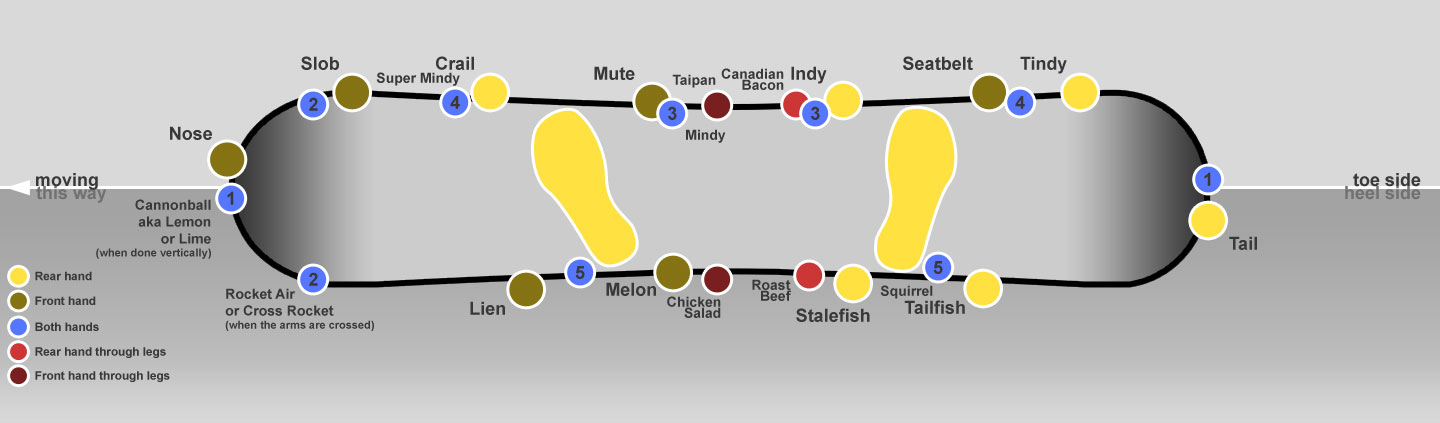
Diagram of various snowboard grabs. Note that a method grab would be executed with the front hand either in the Lien or Melon position, depending on rider preference and ability.

In snowboarding the method grab is considered to be a highly stylish and iconic trick, with it being famously captured in many photos and videos. This grab was first performed on a skateboard, and by the 80's made its way to snowboarding. Within snowboarding there is a debate as to the "proper" way to perform a method on a snowboard, or at least the more stylish and preferred option. Both methods to performing a method involve using the front hand and grabbing the heel side of the board, but whether the hand should be in between the bindings closer to the front binding, or outside the bindings close to the front binding is a matter of preference and ability. Australian snowboarder Valentino Guseli used a method grab during his unofficial world record highest air on a snowboard at the 2024 Swatch Nines.
