= List of French words of English origin =

This is a list of French words, terms and phrases of English language origin, some of a specialist nature, in common usage in the French language or at least within their specialist area.

Modern English is rarely considered a source language as it is itself a mixture of other languages. Culturally, the creation of new words is widely accepted and there is no official body that is treated as the guardian of the language. Each dictionary producer makes their own editorial decisions and there is a slight impetus towards adding new words as this often results in media coverage and public discussion.

Conversely, the Académie française as an institution absolutely guards the French language. This hurdle in the creation of new words allows time and space for English neologisms to enter common usage in the French language. In many cases, l'Académie publishes French alternatives or creates French neologisms, however these words often fail to achieve the public traction which, by definition has to have been achieved by the English word for it to be noticed by l'Académie in the first place.

In nearly all cases the words in this list are not sanctioned by the Académie française.

== Words in accepted use ==
The following words are commonly used and included in French dictionaries.

- le pull: pullover, sweater, jersey
- le shampooing: shampoo
- le scoop, in the context of a news story or as a simile based on that context; while the word is in common use, the Académie française recommends a French synonym, "exclusivité"
- le selfie: included in French dictionary Le Petit Robert in 2015, along with "hashtag"
- le sandwich
- le bulldozer
- l'email / le mail (le courriel is usually preferred)
- cool: great, cool (expression of approval)
- le dressing: dressing room or walk-in closet
- fun: amusing, entertaining, bon vivant
- le hashtag
- l'after-shave
- le blog
- le chewing-gum: chewing gum (American)
- le lifting: facelift, plastic surgery
- le parking: car park
- le weekend
- le tee-shirt
- le sweat-shirt
- le casting: casting call
- people: c'est très people... ("it's very popular/about personalities")
- versatile: the English meaning 'with a variety of uses' is creeping into common French usage, creating a 'faux-ami' with the French meaning of versatile, 'inconsistant,' which is used in a negative way. However, the French word 'versatile' dates from the 14th century. Citation from the Académie Française: 'Borrowed from the Latin versatilis, 'that which turns easily; that which bends to everything', itself derived from versare, 'to turn often; to upset, to overturn; to stir in all directions.'

=== Pseudo-anglicisms ===
- le zapping: channel surfing on a television
- le rugbyman, le tennisman: rugby and tennis player
- les baskets: sports shoes
- babyfoot: table football (foosball)
- le flipper: pinball machine
- le smoking: dinner suit / tuxedo
- le footing: running or jogging
- la redingote: a type of coat, from the English "riding coat"

== Colloquialisms and neologisms ==
=== Technology ===
- Tweeter: to tweet
- Forwarder: to forward an email
- Liker: to like an update or posting, typically on Facebook
- Skyper
- Le buzz
- La box: modem provided by most Internet providers
- Le hot spot: in terms of Wi-Fi availability

=== Business ===
- Au black: in reference to the black market or black economy
- L'open space
- Booster: to boost, as in "booster ma carriere"
- Voyager low-cost: low-cost travel
- Le drive: drive-through food takeaway services
- High tech
- Le challenge: an example of an English word of French origin being reborrowed into French, with the English spelling and pronunciation

=== Sports ===
- Le corner: corner kick
- Le coach: sports coach, not transportation
- Le penalty: penalty kick
- Le goal: goal keeper

=== Arts and entertainment ===
- La punch line
- Le biopic
- L'Infotainment
- Le come back: (of a celebrity, sportsperson or entertainer)
- Le one-man-show

=== Others ===
- Un Black: A black person
- Le box: Typically a room-sized storage unit
- Le relooking: a makeover
- Bruncher: to eat brunch
- Le lifting: facelift, plastic surgery
- La success story: an example of an English phrase made up of words of French origin that has been reborrowed into French
- Le dealer: of illegal drugs
- Le cheese: In the context of "le Royale Cheese" at McDonald's, "un cheese" is a cheeseburger
- Le Brexit
- No stress
- Switcher: To change or swap
- Le wokisme
- Le leader: (in a contest or of a group, organization, or business)

== See also ==
- Joual#English loanwords (Anglicisms)
- Anglicism#French
- Franglais
