= Cameo (coinage) =

Feature of modern proof coinage

Cameo finish

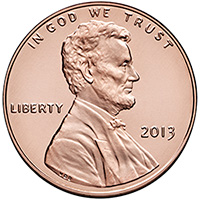
A standard uncirculated Lincoln cent

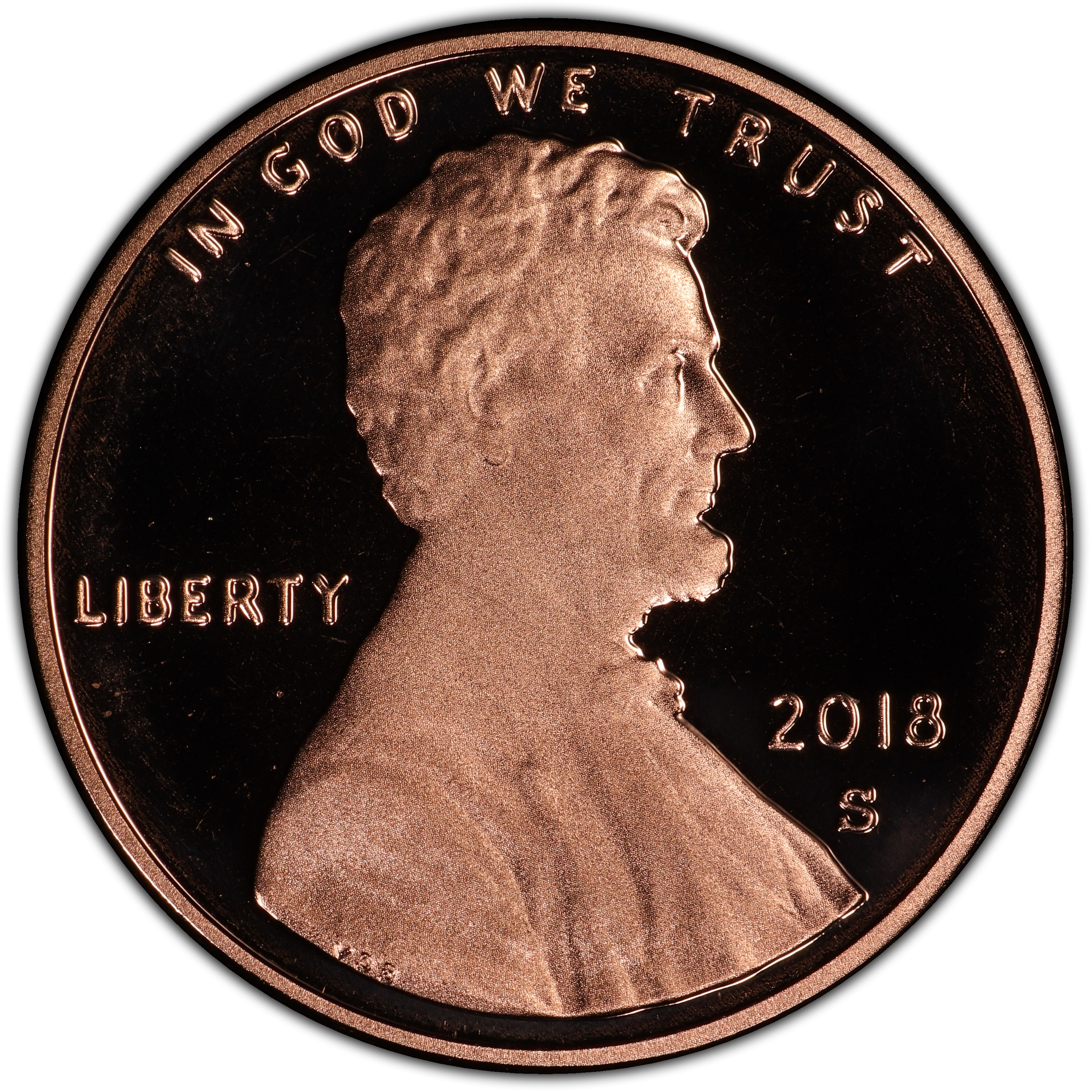
A Lincoln cent displaying deep cameo

In coin grading, cameo is the amount of contrast between the relief (raised or recessed design) and field (background). Cameo is usually seen on proof coinage, with the relief featuring a frosted finish and the field being mirror-like. Not all proof coins have a cameo effect, however.

== History ==
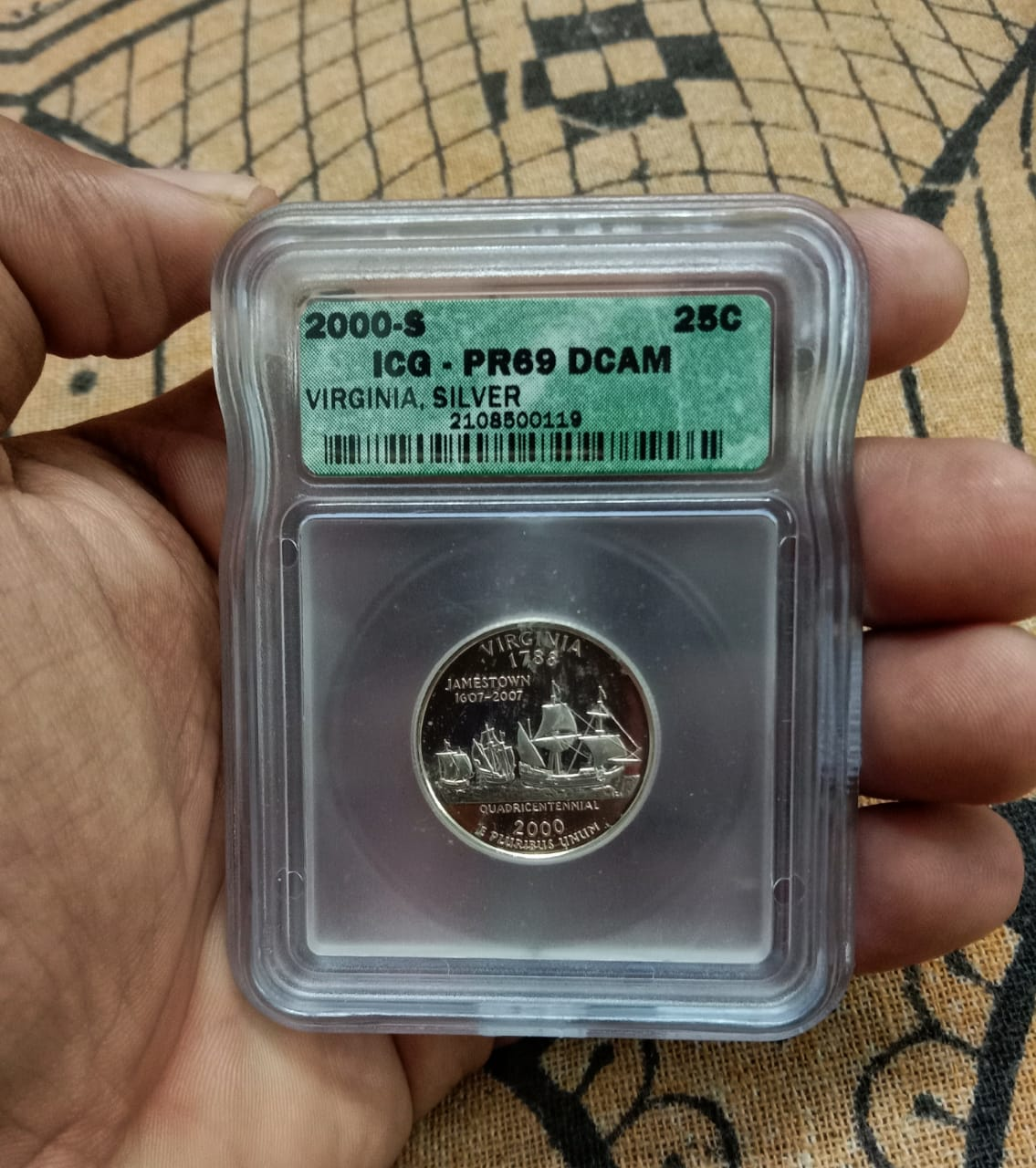
A slabbed US silver State quarter of Virginia in proof 69 deep cameo condition.

Cameos can be found on some of the earliest American proof coins, but have not been produced intentionally for the public until recently. The US Mint, like many mints around the world, now specifically sells cameo coins, which could previously only be found randomly in mint proof sets.

== Non-proof cameos ==
Though rare, general circulation (non-proof) strikes may exhibit cameo as a result of die polishing. These coins are often designated "PL" (Proof-Like) if the cameo effect is strong enough. Coins with highly mirrored fields may even be designated "DMPL" (Deep Mirror Proof-Like, sometimes shortened to "DPL" or Deep Proof-Like). These designations are found mostly on Morgan Dollars, and are more desirable than non-PL coins.

== Reverse cameo ==
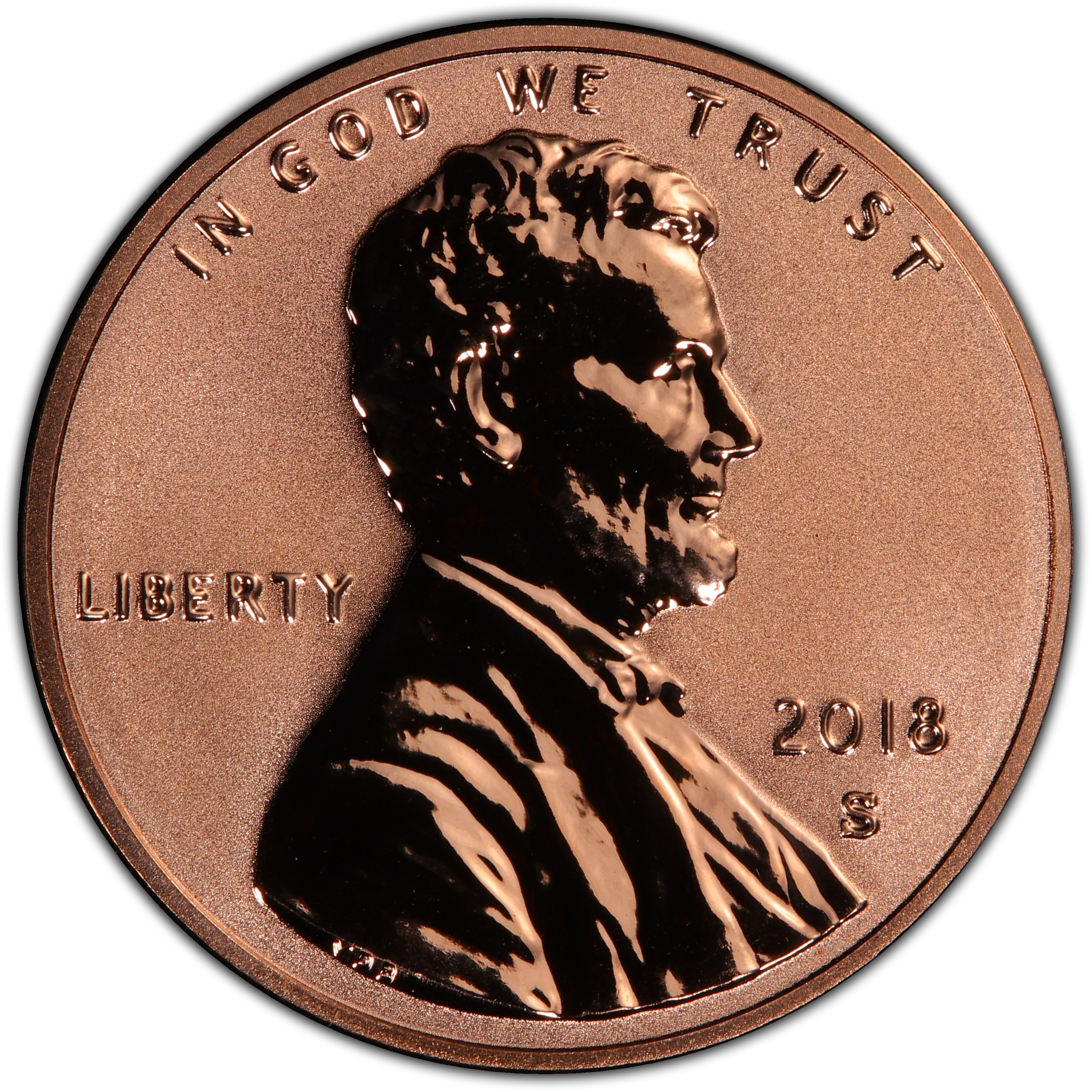
A Lincoln cent displaying reverse cameo

In 2006, the United States Mint issued the first "reverse proof" coins. The coins, varieties of the American Silver Eagle and American Gold Eagle, feature reverse cameo finishes, where the relief is mirror-like and the field has a frosted appearance. Since then, the mint has produced numerous reverse proof coins for various occasions.
