= Proof coinage =

Special samples of a new coin

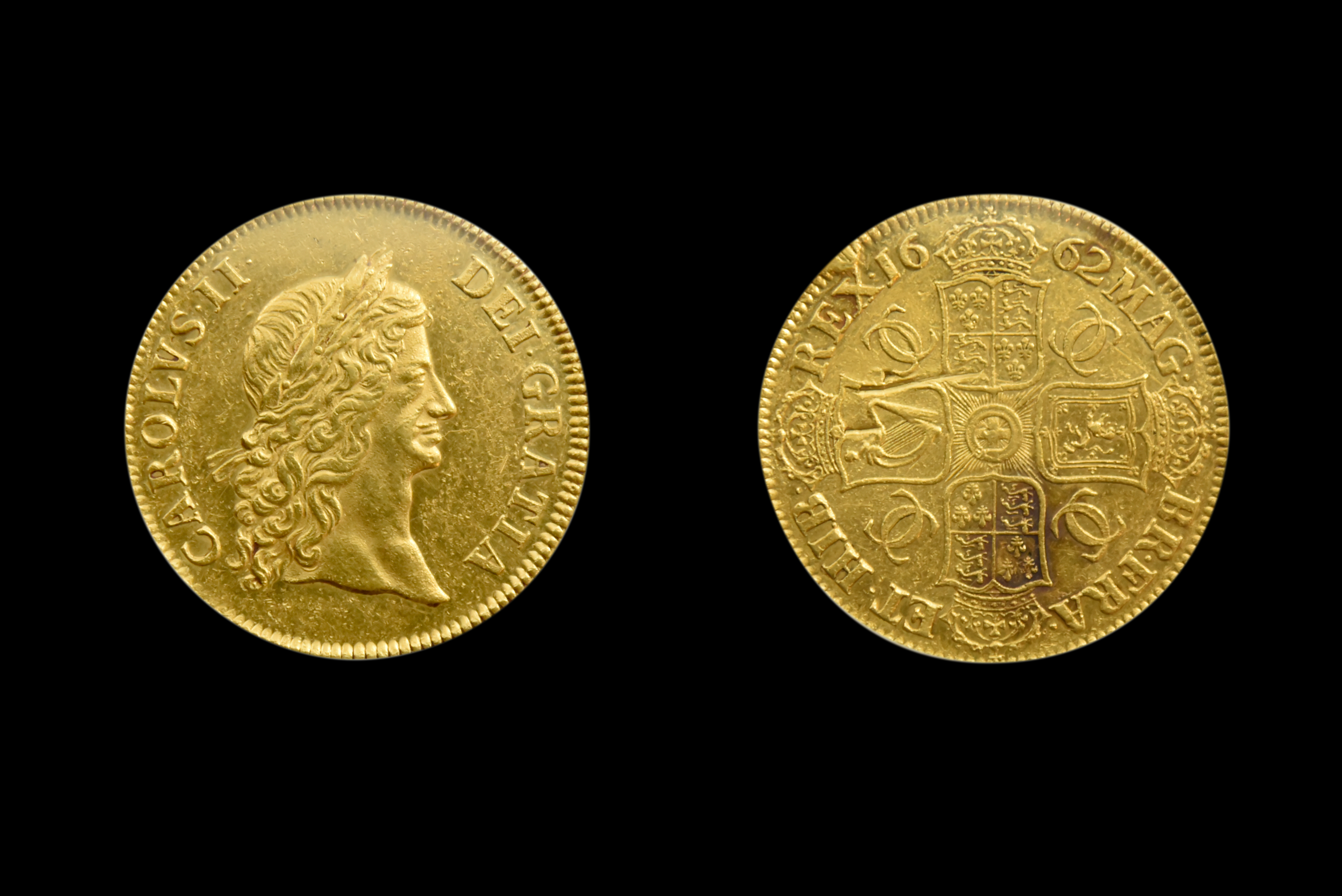
The oldest proof coin was made in 1662

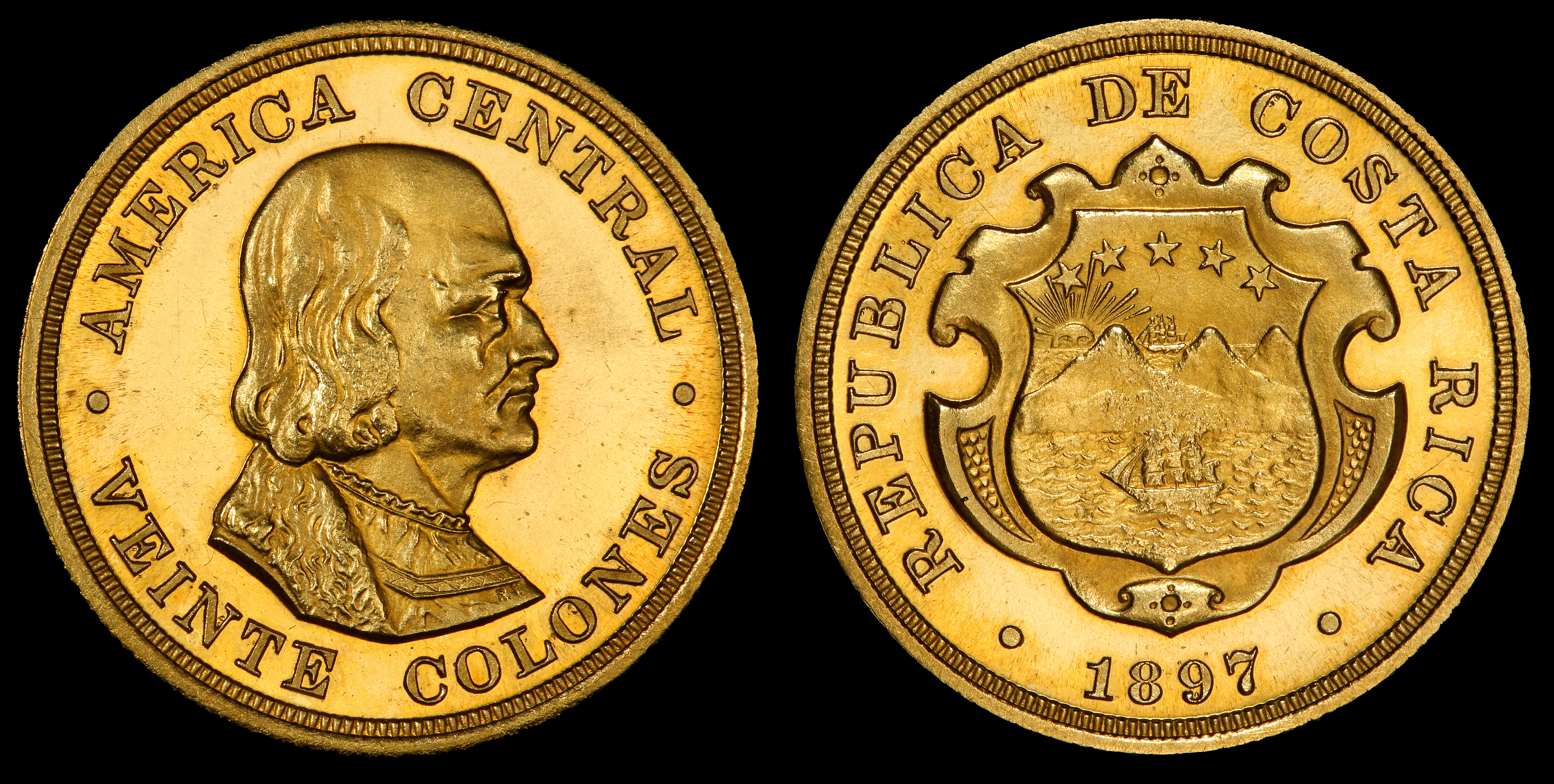
Costa Rica 1897 20 colones (proof) from the first year of issue for coinage.

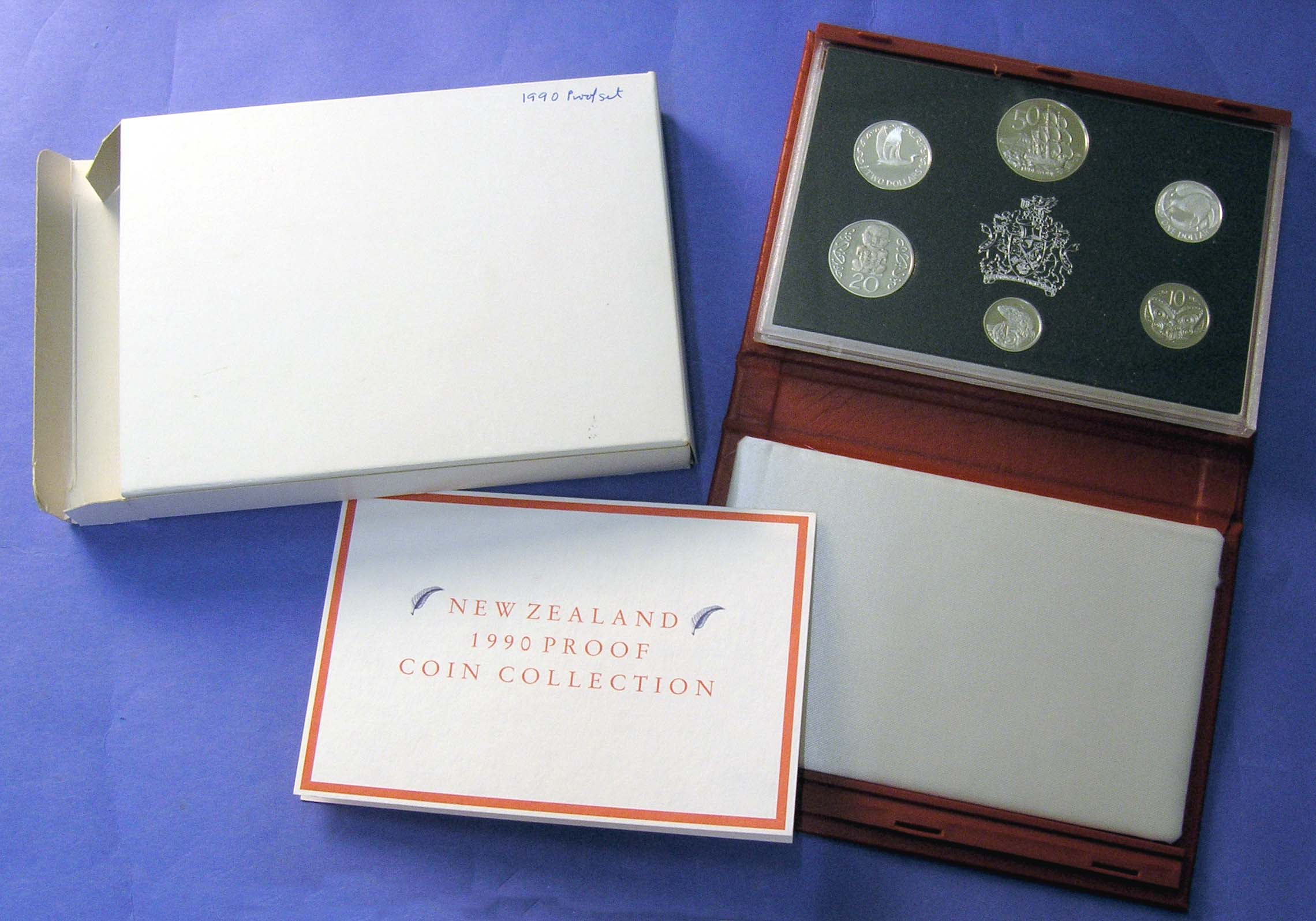
Decorative packaging for proof set: Reserve Bank of New Zealand; Royal Mint

Proof coinage refers to special early samples of a coin issue, historically made for checking the dies (as in demonstrating that something is true) and for archival purposes. In modern times, proofs are often struck in greater numbers, especially for coin collectors (numismatists). Nearly all countries have issued proof coinage.

Preparation of a proof striking usually involved polishing of the dies. They can usually be distinguished from normal circulation coins by their sharper rims and design, as well as much smoother "fields" –the blank area or background of the design.

The dies for making modern proof coins are often treated with chemicals to make certain parts of the design take on a frosted appearance, with the polished fields taking on a mirror finish. Several other methods have been used in the past to achieve this effect, including sand blasting the dies, and matte proofs. Proof coins of the early 19th century even appear to be scratched, but it was part of the production process. The term "proof" refers to the process by which the coins are made and not to the condition of the coin. Certification agencies can grade and assign numerical ratings for proof coins. A PR70 coin is the highest grade possible for a proof coin and indicates a perfect example, with PR69 and lower grades reflecting some deficiency in the strike, centering, details, or other aspect of the coin.

Most proof coins are double struck under higher pressure. This does not normally result in doubling that is readily observable, but does result in the devices being struck fully, resulting in intricate elements of the original die being present on the proof that may not be present in such detail on circulation strikes. After being struck, they are separately and individually handled, in contrast to normal coins which are collected in bins.

== Royal Mint proof coins ==
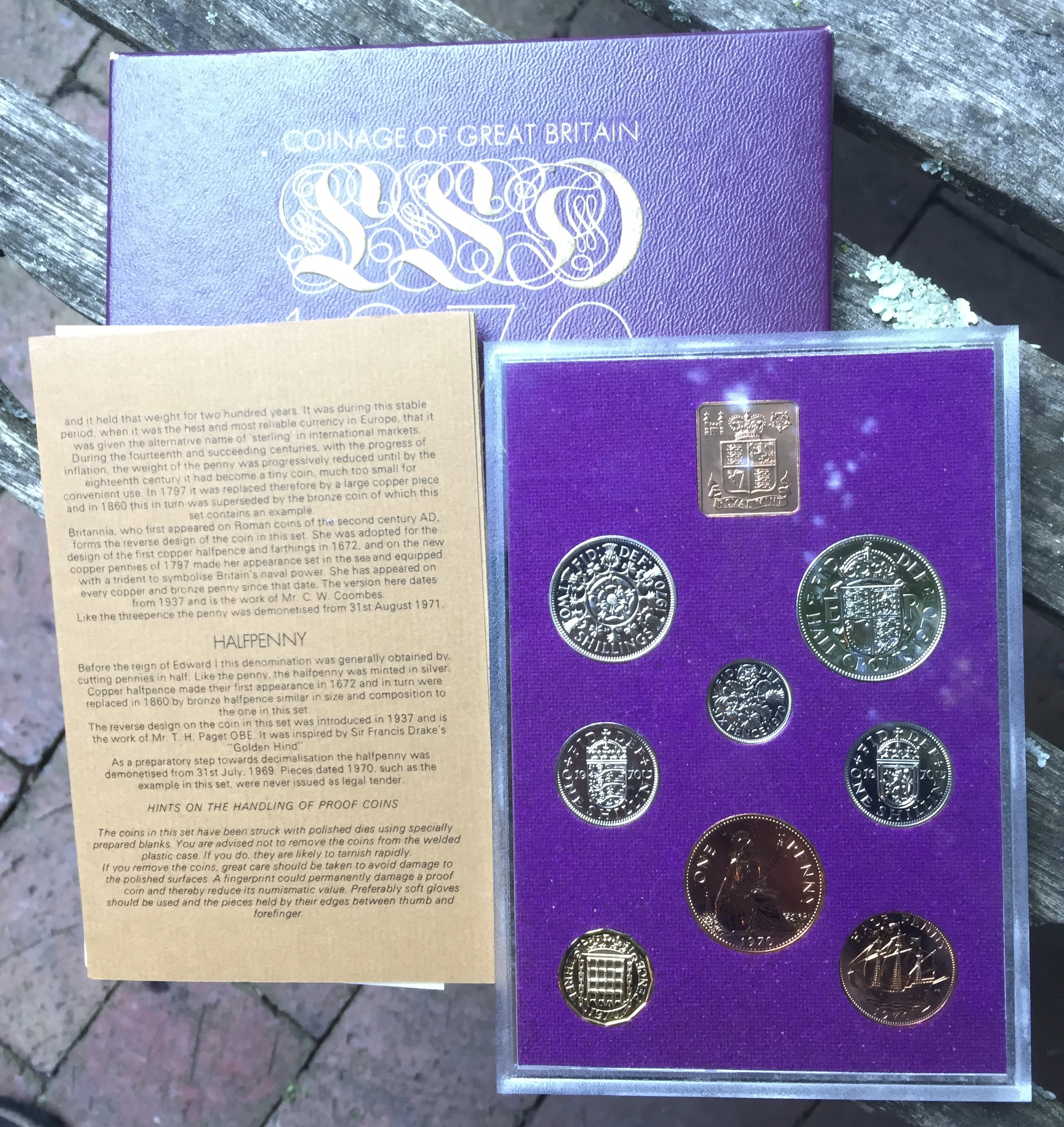
1970 British proof set

William Wellesley Pole undertook the first rigorous attempt to catalog the coinage of Great Britain and Ireland starting in about 1816. Starting that year, proof specimens of coins and medals struck at the Royal Mint were produced for preservation.

Gold coins were omitted from proof sets produced for the coronation of Queen Elizabeth II.

After decimalization, proof sets were heavily marketed internationally.

== United States proof coins ==
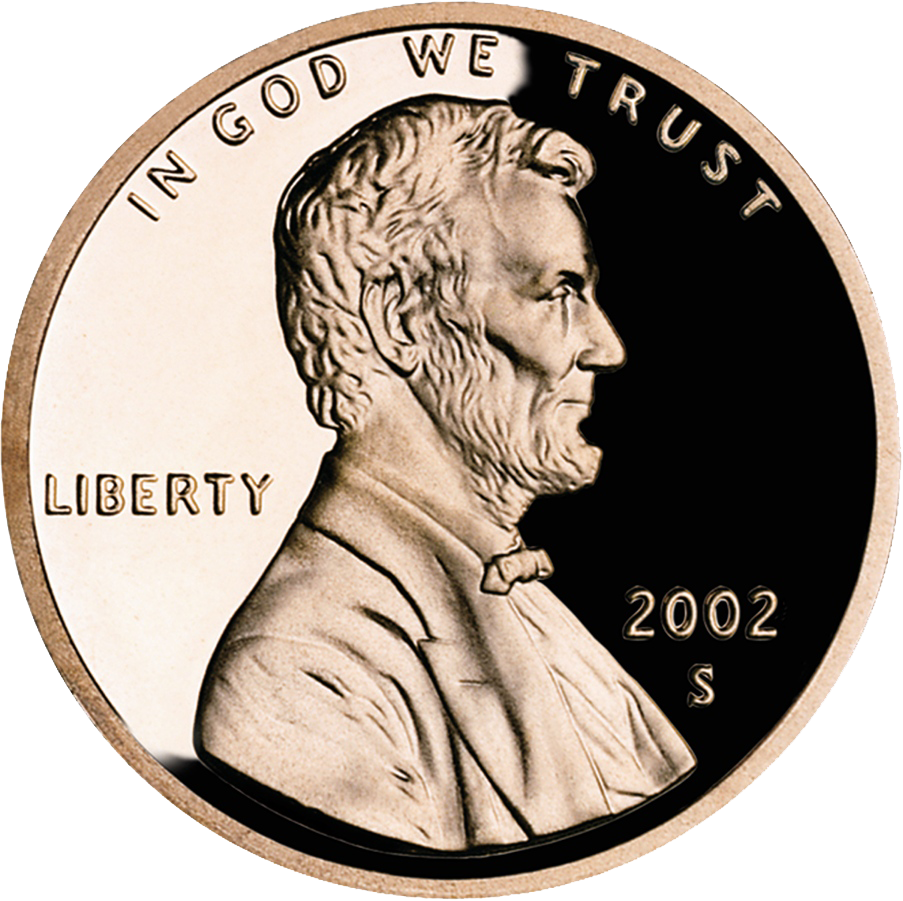
2002 Lincoln cent, obverse, proof with cameo

The U.S. had largely stopped striking proof coins in 1916, although a few later specimens exist. From 1936 to 1942, proof coins could be ordered individually from the United States Mint. Beginning in 1950, customers could order proof coins only as complete sets.

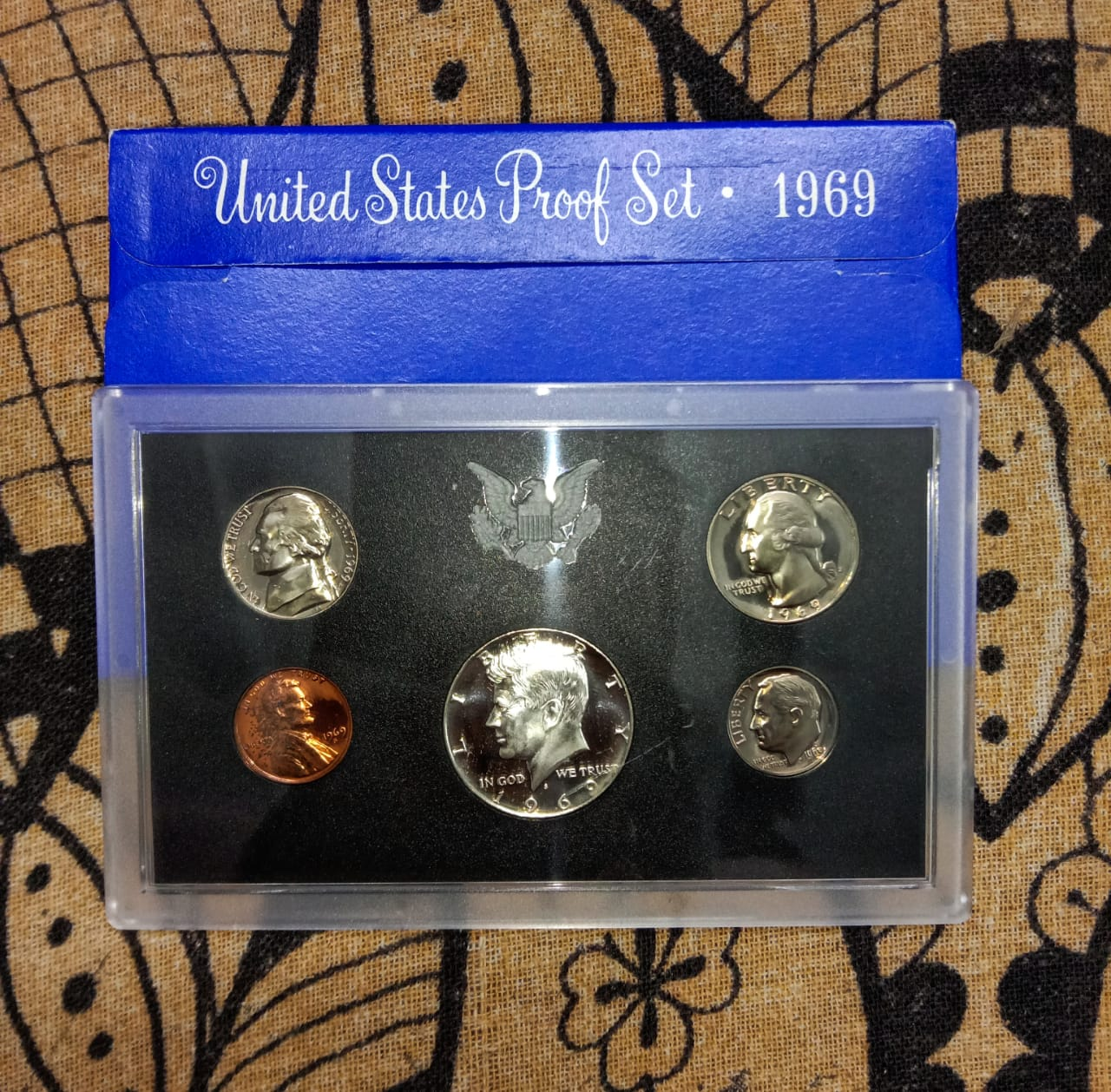
A 1969 United States Mint Proof set of 5 coins including 40% silver Kennedy half dollar

From 1950 to 1955, proof sets were packaged in a box and each of the five coins was sealed in a cellophane bag. 1955 saw both the original "box" packaging and introduced the flat-pack, where the coins were sealed in cellophane and presented in an envelope. The flat-pack packaging continued through 1964, after which the coins were sealed in various styles of hard plasticized cases. (From 1965 to 1967 the production of proof sets was suspended and Special Mint Sets were made in their place. They were made at the San Francisco Assay Office but bore no "S" mint mark.)

Sets struck from 1936 to 1942 (1942 offered a five-coin and a six-coin version, the latter included the silver wartime nickel) and from 1950 to 1972 include the cent, nickel, dime, quarter, and half dollar.

Since 1975, the San Francisco Mint has been used almost exclusively for proof coinage, with the exception of the Susan B. Anthony dollar from 1979 to 1981 and 1999, and a portion of the mintage of cents in the early 1980s. The dollars bear a mint mark of an "S", but the cents are otherwise indistinguishable from those minted at Philadelphia (which bear no mint marks, unlike those years' proof cents from San Francisco and circulation cents from Denver).

From 1973 through 1981 the dollar was also included, and also from 2000 on. The 1999–2008 proof sets also contain five different 50 State quarters. The 2004–2005 series also contain the two Lewis and Clark nickels. The 2007–2016 proof sets also include presidential dollars. The 2010–2021 proof sets also contain America the Beautiful quarters, depicting different National Parks and Monuments. Proof sets issued in 2009 contain 18 coins — the most ever included — as that year featured four different reverses for the Lincoln Cent, six quarters issued under the District of Columbia and United States Territories quarters program, four Presidential and one Native American dollar struck that year, and the five cent, dime, and half dollar coins. Proof sets containing only 2009 cents, 50 State quarters, America the Beautiful quarters, Presidential dollars, and American Innovation dollars are also available.

The U.S. Mint has also released special proof sets, such as in 1976, when a proof set of three 40% silver-clad coins: the quarter, half-dollar and dollar coins depicting special reverses to commemorate the U.S. Bicentennial was issued. From 1971 to 1974, proof silver-clad Eisenhower dollars were issued in a plastic case contained in a brown wood-grain finish slipcase box, and are referred to as "Brown Ikes". Proof Susan B. Anthony dollars were struck in 1999. Although these proof dollars were sold separately and not included in the proof sets for that year, some third parties used the cases from other years to create 1999 proof sets that include the dollar, prompting the U.S. Mint to advise the public that these sets were not government-issued sets. A proof "Coin & Chronicles" set was issued for 2009, which included one each of the 4 different Lincoln Cent designs and a commemorative Lincoln Silver Dollar, presented in special packaging. Other sets, called "Prestige Proof" sets, also contain selected commemorative coins. These sets were sold from 1983 to 1997 (except 1985) at an additional premium. As Legacy Proof sets, the practice was resumed from 2005 to 2008.

Occasionally, there are errors which escape the Mint's inspection process, resulting in some very rare and expensive proof sets. This has happened at least seven times: 1968-S, 1970-S and 1975-S and in the 1983-S Prestige set, each with a dime that has no mint mark; a small number of 1971-S sets included a nickel without a mint mark; 1990-S saw both regular and Prestige sets which included a penny with no mint mark.

Not as rare (or as expensive) are proof sets issued with coin varieties that are less common than those found in other sets issued in the same year. These include the 1960 and 1970-S sets, both of which are found in either a "small date" or "large date" variety, which refers to the size and position of the date on the Lincoln cent. The 1979-S and 1981-S sets each come in either a "Type I" or a "Type II" version, where on all coins the "S" mint mark is either "filled" (also known as the "blob" mint mark) or "clear". 1964 has a design variation where the President's portrait on the Kennedy half-dollar has "accented hair". The design was modified early in the production (reputedly at the request of Jacqueline Kennedy) to give the hair a smoother appearance. This resulted in the "accented hair" variety being somewhat rarer and commanding a premium over the "regular" variety.

Since 1992 the mint has struck proof sets in both silver and base metal. Also, "Silver Premier" sets, featuring deluxe packaging, were offered from 1992 to 1998. U.S. commemorative and bullion platinum, palladium, gold, and silver coins are also often issued in both uncirculated and proof types, sometimes with different mint marks. From 1992 to 2018, the silver coins in silver proof sets contained "coin silver", 90% silver and 10% copper, the same silver content as coins minted through 1964. Beginning in 2019, silver coins in silver proof sets were issued in "fine silver", 99.9% silver, the same silver content as silver bullion coins.

Starting in 1947 the U.S. mint began producing "mint sets", and because of the terms used there is some confusion over the difference between these and proof sets. These are uncirculated coins that have been specially packaged, and are generally neither as expensive nor as valuable as proofs. There are some exceptions, however. Those produced from 1947 to 1958 (none were made in 1950) were double sets packaged in cardboard holders and have good collector demand. Because mint sets contain specimens from each mint the precious metal value of the coins in a mint set could exceed the value of a proof set for common dates. Another exception is the 1996 mint set, which, in addition to specimens from the Philadelphia and Denver mints, contained a Roosevelt dime from the West Point mint (commemorating the 50th anniversary of the Roosevelt dime) and which was available only in this mint set. From 1965 to 1967 the mint did not sell proof or uncirculated coins, but only a hybrid product, "special mint sets", none of which are particularly valuable. From 2005 through 2010 the U.S. Mint used a special "satin finish" on the coins in its uncirculated sets, but in 2011 changed to a "brilliant finish" so that contact marks incurred during the normal production process would be less noticeable.

The Philadelphia and Denver mints also sold annual "souvenir sets" from their gift shops since 1973 (1972 for Denver). These are not mint sets and generally not of high collectable value, although the 1982 and 1983 sets are in demand, since no "official" mint sets were issued during those years. Sales of the souvenir sets ended in 1998 with the launch of the 50 State quarters. Finally, individual dealers have made unofficial "year sets", privately packaging all denominations of a certain date. The latter have no value beyond their individual coins. Members of the public should be careful to understand what products they are being offered, and that, until supplies are exhausted, current and previous mint and proof sets are available directly from the mint.

== See also ==
- Cameo (coinage)
- Coin grading
- Commemorative coin
- Japanese Proof Set
- Pattern coin
- Specimen banknote
- Uncirculated coin

== Sources ==
- Challis, C. E., ed. (1992). A New History of the Royal Mint. Cambridge University Press. ISBN 9780521240260.
- Dannreuther, John W. (2004). Official Guide to Coin Grading and Counterfeit Detection (2nd ed.). New York: House of Collectibles. p. 432. ISBN 0-375-72050-2.
- Evans, George Greenlief (1892). Illustrated History of the United States Mint: With Short Historical Sketches and Illustrations of the Branch Mints and Assay Offices, and a Complete Description of American Coinage ... Philadelphia: G. G. Evans.
