= Coin of the Year =

- Native name: COTY Awards
- Description: Recognizing excellence in numismatic design and craftsmanship
- Country: United States
- Presented by: Krause Publications / World Coin News

The Coin of the Year (COTY) is an awards program founded and annually conducted by the American publisher Krause Publications of Iola, Wisconsin, and directed at the coin producing industry. Awards are given for numismatic design, artistic vision and craftsmanship. A panel of international judges chooses the coins from those issued two years prior to the year of the award.

== Overview ==
The COTY was awarded for the first time in 1984, in which coins issued in 1982 were assessed. A panel of judges chooses ten coins to be nominees for each of ten categories. These nominees will then be reviewed by an international panel of judges who are numismatic experts, journalist, authors, coin designers, and mint, bank and museum officials. Category winners are selected in the first round of voting and Coin of the Year in the second round, chosen from the category winners.

== Categories ==
Awards are currently given in ten categories. When the awards were first started, there were six categories. Five categories have since been added and one was dropped.

- Best Bi-metallic: (1995–present) Bi-metallic coins are composed of two metals which can be seen, generally one metal in an outer ring and one in the inner ring.
- Best Contemporary Event: (1996–present) Coins which commemorate events, institutions physical entities, or individuals which are deemed to be most important in terms of current or recent events influencing a people or mankind.
- Best Crown: Coins which have all-around aesthetic and commercial appeal, and have a minimum diameter of 33mm.
- Best Circulating: (1987–present) Circulating monetary unit coins which are made of non-precious metals, possess all-around aesthetic and commercial appeal.
- Best Gold: Coins fabricated of gold, platinum, Palladium, or another exotic precious metal which have all-around aesthetic and commercial appeal.
- Best Silver: Coins fabricated of silver which have all-around aesthetic and commercial appeal.
- Most Popular: (1986-2013) Coins with commercial sales and artistic caliber which appeals to the general public internationally.
- Most Artistic: Coins selected solely on the value of their artistic merit.
- Most Historically Significant: Coins which commemorate events, institutions, physical entities, or individual which are deemed to be most important in terms of the historical heritage of a people or mankind.
- Most Innovative: (1990–present) Coins which contain pioneering metallic alloys, non-typical coinage materials, planchet shapes, thickness, sizes, themes, distribution methods or other innovations.
- Most Inspirational: (1995–present) Coins featuring themes, events, institutions, physical entities, or individuals that represent peace, freedom, and human rights.

== List of award winners ==
=== 2023 (minted in 2021) ===
Category	Face value	Metal	Mint	Topic
Coin of the Year	5 hryvnias	Nickel, silver	National Bank of Ukraine	30th anniversary of Ukrainian independence
Best Bi-metallic	25 euro	Silver, niobium	Austrian Mint	Smart mobility
Best Circulating	10 cents (Canadian)	Nickel, steel plated	Royal Canadian Mint	100th anniversary of Bluenose 10 cent piece
Best Contemporary Event	10 hryvnias	Silver	National Bank of Ukraine	25th anniversary – Ukrainian constitution
Best Crown	20 CAD	Silver, gold, black rhodium	Royal Canadian Mint	Grey wolf
Best Gold	100 USD	Gold	U.S. Mint	American Liberty
Best Silver	20 yuan	Silver	Central Mint (China)	Auspicious culture – swans
Most Artistic	5 hryvnias	Nickel, silver	National Bank of Ukraine	30th anniversary of Ukrainian independence
Most Historically Significant	50 pence (GBP)	Silver	Royal Mint (UK)	Discovery of insulin
Most Innovative	20 euro	Silver	Austrian Mint	The Milky Way
Most Inspirational	20 NZD	Silver	Artisan Coin Productions	The next evolution – robots in love

=== 2022 (minted in 2020) ===
Category	Face value	Metal	Mintage	Mint	Topic
Coin of the Year	100 euro	Gold		Austrian Mint	The Gold of the Pharaos
Best Bi-metallic	25 euro	Silver, niobium		Austrian Mint	Big Data
Best Circulating	2 rand	Nickel, copper		South African Mint	Freedom and Security of the Person
Best Contemporary Event	10 euro	Silver		Monnaie de Paris	Peace & Victory
Best Crown	10 euro	Silver		Monnaie de Paris	Champs-Élysées
Best Gold	100 euro	Gold		Austrian Mint	The gold of the Pharaos
Best Silver	5 euro	Silver		Royal Dutch Mint (for Latvia)	Linden leaf
Most Artistic	20 euro	Silver		Austrian Mint	Centenary of the Salzburg Festival
Most Historically Significant	1 dollar	Silver		United States Mint	Women's suffrage
Most Innovative	5 dollar	Silver		MDM (for Barbados)	The Blue Marble
Most Inspirational	5 euro	Silver (gold plated)		Bank of Latvia	Personal freedom

Reference and images:

=== 2021 (minted in 2019) ===
Category	Face value	Metal	Mintage	Mint	Topic
Coin of the Year	1 dollar	Silver	100,000 (across all products)	United States Mint	Apollo 11 50th anniversary
Best Bi-metallic	25 euro	Silver, niobium		Austrian Mint	Artificial intelligence
Best Circulating	2 euro	Bi-metallic		German Mints	30th anniversary of the fall of the Berlin Wall
Best Contemporary Event	1 dollar	Silver	100,000 (across all products)	United States Mint	Apollo 11 50th anniversary
Best Crown	10 euro	Silver, gilt, rhodium		Monnaie de Paris	Paris's treasures, city of lights: Eiffel Tower
Best Gold	100 yuan	Gold		China Gold Coin Inc.	Art of Chinese calligraphy
Best Silver	1 dollar	Silver	100,000 (across all products)	United States Mint	Apollo 11 50th anniversary
Most Artistic	10 euro	Silver		Monnaie de Paris	Fall of the Berlin Wall
Most Historically Significant	100 euro	Gold		Austrian Mint	The gold of Mesopotamia
Most Innovative	20 dollar	Silver		Cook Islands	Meteorites: Chicxulub crater
Most Inspirational	50 pence	Silver		Royal Mint (UK)	Innovation in space: Stephen Hawking

Reference and images:

=== 2020 (minted in 2018) ===
Category	Face value	Metal	Mintage	Mint	Topic
Coin of the Year	5 euro	Silver (gold plated)	3000	Lithuanian Mint (for Latvia)	Honey coin
Best Bi-metallic	25 euro	Bi-metallic		Austrian Mint	Anthropocene
Best Circulating	2 euro	Bi-metallic		Austrian Mint	100th anniversary of the founding of the Austrian Republic
Best Contemporary Event	5 euro	Silver		Italian Mint	70th anniversary of the Italian constitution
Best Crown	5 dollars	Silver		Royal Australian Mint	The Earth and beyond: Earth
Best Gold	50 euro	Gold		Austrian Mint	Vienna schools of psychotherapy: Alfred Adler
Best Silver	5 euro	Silver		Lithuania Mint	Joninės (Rasos)
Most Artistic	5 euro	Silver (gold plated)		Bank of Latvia	Honey
Most Historically Significant	10 euro	Silver		Monnaie de Paris	Great War: People's jubilation
Most Innovative	5, 10, and 20 euro	Silver		Lithuanian Mint	100th anniversary of the restoration of Lithuanian independence
Most Innovative	50 euro	Gold		Lithuanian Mint	100th anniversary of the restoration of Lithuanian independence
Most Inspirational	1 dollar	Silver		Perth Mint	100th anniversary of the end of World War 1

Reference and images:

=== 2019 (minted in 2017) ===
Category	Face value	Metal	Mintage	Mint	Topic
Coin of the Year	50 euro	Silver	500	Monnaie de Paris	French excellence – Guy Savoy
Best Bi-metallic	2 euro	Copper, nickel	10,000	Monnaie de Paris	The fight against breast cancer
Best Circulating	20 Ouguiya	Brass, nickel bronze		Central Bank of Mauritania	Camels
Best Contemporary Event	2 rand	Silver	1,000	South African Mint	South African inventions: the heart transplant
Best Crown	5 dollar	Silver	499	Coin Invest Trust (for Cook Islands)	Scarab collection: Red Dawn
Best Gold	100 dollar	Gold	100,000	United States Mint	American Liberty – US Mint's 225th anniversary
Best Silver	50 euro	Silver	500	Monnaie de Paris	French Excellence – Guy Savoy
Most Artistic	50 euro	Gold	20,000	Austrian Mint	Vienna Schools of Psychotherapy – Sigmund Freud
Most Historically Significant	25 euro	Silver	30,000	Austrian Mint	Vienna Philharmonic Orchestra's 175th anniversary
Most Innovative	20 dollar	Silver	499	Powercoin (for Palau)	Great Micromosaic Passion – The Birth of Venus
Most Inspirational	1 dollar	Silver	12,256	United States Mint	Boys Town centennial commemorative

Reference and images:

=== 2018 (minted in 2016) ===
Category	Face value	Metal	Mintage	Mint	Topic
Coin of the Year	5 euro	Copper, nickel	2,000,000	German Mints (Bavarian State Mint and SMBW)	Planet Earth with polymer ring
Best Bi-metallic	25 euro	Niobium, silver	65,000	Austrian Mint	Time
Best Circulating	20 yuan	Bronze, nickel, steel	8,000,000	China Banknote Printing and Minting	Year of the monkey
Best Contemporary Event	20 francs	Silver	30,000	Swissmint	Gotthard Road Tunnel
Best Crown	50 euro	Silver	500	Monnaie de Paris	Van Cleef & Arpels
Best Gold	100 dollar	Gold	30,000	Austrian Mint	Wildlife in Our Sights, the fox
Best Silver	5 dollar	Silver	5,000	Royal Australian Mint	Northern sky Cassiopeia, dome-shaped
Most Artistic	5 euro	Silver	3,000	Lithuanian Mint (for Latvia)	National entrepreneur, multi-faceted and QR code
Most Historically Significant	200 euro	Gold	500	Monnaie de Paris	Joan of Arc
Most Innovative	5 euro	Copper, nickel	2,000,000	German Mints (Bavarian State Mint and SMBW)	Planet Earth with polymer ring
Most Inspirational	20 dollar	Silver	7,000	Royal Canadian Mint	Mother Earth, 3-D droplet

Reference and images:

=== 2017 (minted in 2015) ===
Category	Face value	Metal	Mintage	Mint	Topic
Coin of the Year	10 euro	Silver	6,000	Italian State Mint	70 years of peace in Europe
Best Bi-metallic	5 euro	Copper, nickel	45,000	Mint of Finland	Lapland reindeer
Best Circulating	25 cent	Copper, nickel	776,800,000	United States Mint	America the Beautiful quarters – Kisatchie National Forest
Best Contemporary Event	10,000 Yen	Gold	2,188	Japan Mint	2011 Great East Japan Earthquake reconstruction program
Best Crown	5 pound	Nickel	10,000	Royal Mint	Winston Churchill
Best Gold	100 euro	Gold	30,000	Austrian Mint	Capercaille
Best Silver	10 euro	Silver	10,000	Mint of Finland	70th anniversary of peace after World War II
Most Artistic	10 euro	Silver	6,000	Italian Mint	70 years of peace in Europe
Most Historically Significant	20 dollar	Silver	10,000	Royal Canadian Mint	100th anniversary of "In Flanders Fields"
Most Innovative	2 dollar	Silver	1,500	B. H. Mayer Mint (for Cook Islands)	Space time continuum
Most Inspirational	1 dollar	Silver	24,742	United States Mint	March of Dimes – Salk polio vaccine

Reference and images:

=== 2016 (minted in 2014) ===
Category	Face value	Metal	Mintage	Mint	Topic
Coin of the Year	50 cent	Copper, nickel	257,000	United States Mint	Baseball
Best Bi-metallic	25 euro	Niobium, silver	65,000	Austrian Mint	Science of evolution
Best Circulating	2 pound	Copper, nickel	5,720,000	Royal Mint	WWI – Lord Kitchener
Best Contemporary Event	5 euro	Silver	10,000	Royal Dutch Mint (for Latvia)	25th anniversary of the Baltic Way demonstration
Best Crown	20 dollar	Silver	7,500	Royal Canadian Mint	Maple leaf tree canopy
Best Gold	5 dollar	Gold	17,677	United States Mint	Baseball
Best Silver	20 euro	Silver	50,000	Austrian Mint	Fall of the Iron Curtain
Most Artistic	50 euro	Gold	30,000	Austrian Mint	Gustav Klimt painting, Judith II
Most Historically Significant	10 euro	Silver	195,000	German Mints	Fahrenheit’s invention of the mercury thermometer
Most Innovative	50 cent	Copper, nickel	257,173	United States Mint	Baseball
Most Inspirational	10 zloty	Silver	30,000	Polish Mint	Birth of Jan Karski

Reference and images:

=== 2015 (minted in 2013) ===
Category	Face value	Metal	Mintage	Mint	Topic
Coin of the Year	50 euro	Gold	30,000	Austrian Mint	Gustav Klimt – The Expectation
Best Bi-metallic	25 euro	Niobium, silver	65,000	Austrian Mint	Tunneling
Best Circulating	25 cents	Copper, nickel	920,695	United States Mint	Mount Rushmore National Memorial
Best Contemporary Event	1 rubel	Silver	5,000	Polish Mint (for Belarus)	90th year of BPS-Sberbank (a Belarus bank)
Best Crown	10 euro	Silver	10,000	B. H. Mayer Mint (for Ireland)	James Joyce
Best Gold	50 dollar	Gold	30,000	Austrian Mint	Gustav Klimt – The Expectation
Best Silver	1 Lats	Silver	5,000	Royal Dutch Mint (for Latvia)	Richard Wagner's 200th birthday
Most Artistic	1000 euro	Gold	30,000	Austrian Mint	Wildlife in Our Sights – red deer
Most Historically Significant	5 euro	Silver	17,500	Royal Dutch Mint	Peace of Utrecht
Most Innovative	500 tögrög	Silver	2,500	Coin Investment Trust (for Mongolia)	Mongolian wolf
Most Inspirational	3 dollar	Silver	15,000	Royal Canadian Mint	Fishing

Reference and images:

=== 2014 (minted in 2012) ===
Category	Face value	Metal	Mintage	Mint	Topic
Coin of the Year	10 euro	Silver	30,000	Monnaie de Paris	Yves Klein
Best Bi-metallic	50 euro	Gold, silver	5,000	Mint of Finland	Helsinki – World design capital
Best Circulating	1 dollar	Aluminum, Bronze	20,000	Royal Australian Mint	Australian year of the farmer
Best Contemporary Event	10 pound	Silver	7,500	Royal Mint	2012 Olympic games in London
Best Crown	5 dollar	Silver	10,000	Royal Australian Mint	Southern Cross in night sky
Best Gold	20 euro	Gold	1,500	Italian Mint	Flora in the art: Middle Ages
Best Silver	10 euro	Silver	10,000	Monnaie de Paris	Ocean liner
Most Artistic	10 euro	Silver	30,000	Monnaie de Paris	Yves Klein
Most Historically Significant	10 euro	Silver	5,000	Bank of Greece	Greek Culture: Socrates
Most Innovative	25 cent	Nickel, steel	25,000	Royal Canadian Mint	Glow-in-the-dark dinosaur skeleton
Most Inspirational	5 pound	Copper, nickel	3,000	Royal Mint (for Alderney Island)	Remembrance Day

Reference and images:

=== 2013 (minted in 2011) ===
Category	Face value	Metal	Mintage	Mint	Topic
Coin of the	5 euro	Silver	12,000	Royal Dutch Mint	100th anniversary of the Dutch Mint featuring QR code
Best Contemporary Event	25 euro	Silver	65,000	Austrian Mint	Robotics
Best Crown	10 euro	Silver	10,000	Monnaie de Paris	From Clovis to Republic – 1500 years of French history
Best Gold	50 rand	Gold	1,000	South African Mint	Nature's families: the meerkat
Best Silver	20 dollar	Silver	200,000	Royal Canadian Mint	Canoe
Best Circulation	1 Litas	Copper nickel	1,000,000	Lithuanian Mint	2011 European basketball championship
Most Artistic	1 Lats	Silver	7,000	Mint of Finland (for Latvia)	Alexandrs Caks, fog mists the pane
Most Historically Significant	10 Som	Silver	2,000	Saint Petersburg Mint (for Kyrgyzstan)	The Silk Road
Most Innovative	5 euro	Silver	12,000	Royal Dutch Mint, The Netherlands	100th anniversary of the Dutch Mint featuring QR code
Most Inspirational	10 zloty	Silver	50,000	Polish Mint	100th anniversary of the Society for the Protection of the Blind
Most Popular	500 tögrög	Silver	2,500	Coin Invest Trust (for Mongolia)	Ural owl

Reference and images:

=== 2012 (minted in 2010) ===
Category	Face value	Metal	Mintage	Mint	Topic
Coin of the Year	2 shekel	Silver	2,800	Israel Coins and Medals Corp.	Jonah in the whale
Best Circulation	2 euro	Bi-metallic	130,000	Italian Mint (for San Marino)	500th anniversary of the birth of Sandro Botticelli
Best Contemporary Event	10 euro	Silver	184,200	Staatliche Münze Berlin	German unification
Best Crown	5 Diner	Silver	3,000	Andorra	Brown bear
Best Gold	100 pound sterling	Gold	7,500	Royal Mint	Olympic Games Faster Series: Neptune
Best Silver	10 euro	Silver	30,000	Austrian Mint	Erzberg in Styria
Most Artistic	2 shekel	Silver	2,800	Israel Coins and Medals Corp.	Jonah in the whale
Most Historically Significant	100 dollars	Gold	5,000	Royal Canadian Mint	400th anniversary of the Hudson's Bay Company
Most Innovative	1,500 francs	Silver	2,500	Coin Invest Trust (for Ivory Coast)	Mecca qibla compass
Most Inspirational	20 euro	Silver	10,000	Mint of Finland	Children and creativity
Most Popular	1.5 euro	Silver	11,358,200	Austrian Mint	Vienna Philharmonic
People's Choice	5,000 forint	Silver	5,000	Hungarian Mint	Orseg National Park

Reference and images:

=== 2011 (minted in 2009) ===
Category	Face value and metal	Executing company, issuing country	Topic
Coin of the Year	100 rand, gold	South African Mint, South Africa	White rhino
Best Contemporary Event	10 euro, silver	Monnaie de Paris, France	Fall of the Berlin Wall
Best Crown	20 euro, silver	Suomen Rahapaja, Finland	Peace and security
Best Gold	100 rand, gold	South African Mint, South Africa	White rhino
Best Silver	20 dollars, silver	Royal Canadian Mint, Canada	Crystal snowflake
Best Trade	2 euro, bi-metallic	Mincovna Kremnica, Slovakia	First year of euro issuance
Most Artistic	300 dollars, gold	Royal Canadian Mint, Canada	Native American summer moon mask
Most Historically Significant	100 tenge, silver	Kazakhstan	Attila the Hun
Most Innovative	2 pound sterling, silver–crystal	Pobjoy Mint, British Indian Ocean Territory	Life of the sea turtle
Most Inspirational	10 zloty, silver	Mennica Polska, Poland	World War II Polish Underground
Most Popular	10 euro, silver	Austrian Mint, Austria	Basilisk of Vienna
People's Choice	5,000 forint, silver	Magyar Pénzverő Zrt., Hungary	World Heritage sites in Hungary, Budapest

=== 2010 (minted in 2008) ===
Category	Face value and metal	Executing company, issuing country	Topic
Coin of the Year	20 Lats, gold	Austrian Mint, Latvia	Coins of Latvia
Best Contemporary Event	1 New sheqalim, silver	Israel Coins and Medals Corp., Israel	60th Anniversary of Israel
Best Crown	10 euro, silver	Austrian Mint, Austria	Klosterneuburg Monastery
Best Gold	20 Lats, gold	Austrian Mint, Latvia	Coins of Latvia
Best Silver	10 euro, silver	Staatliche Münzen Baden-Württemberg (Karlsruhe), Germany	Franz Kafka
Best Trade	2 euro, bi-metallic	Suomen Rahapaja, Cyprus	Ancient Statue Cross
Most Artistic	200 zloty, gold	Mennica Polska, Poland	Warsaw Ghetto Uprising
Most Historically Significant	100 tenge, silver	Kazakhstan	Genghis Khan
Most Innovative	25 euro, silver–Niobium	Austrian Mint, Austria	Fascination Light
Most Inspirational	2,500 dollars, gold	Royal Canadian Mint, Canada	Towards Confederation
Most Popular	1 dollar, silver	US Mint, United States of America	American eagle
People's Choice	5,000 forint, silver	Magyar Pénzverő Zrt., Hungary	Tokaj wine region

=== 2009 (minted in 2007) ===
Category	Face value and metal	Executing company, issuing country	Topic
Coin of the Year	500 Togrog, silver	Coin Invest Trust, Mongolia	Wildlife Protection: Gulo Gulo
Best Contemporary Event	1 dollar, silver	US Mint, United States of America	The desegregation of Little Rock Central High School in 1957
Best Crown	20 rouble, silver	Lithuanian Mint, Belarus	Pancake week
Best Gold	1,000 crowns, gold	Denmark	Polar bear
Best Silver	500 Togrog, silver	Coin Invest Trust, Mongolia	Wildlife protection: Gulo Gulo
Best Trade	2 euro, bi-metallic	Istituto Poligrafico e Zecca dello Stato, Italy	Raphael’s Dante Alighieri
Most Artistic	10 euro, silver	Austrian Mint, Austria	Melk Abbey
Most Historically Significant	1 dollar, silver	US Mint, United States of America	The Founding of Jamestown in 1607
Most Innovative	50 dollars, silver	Pobjoy Mint, British Virgin Islands	Centenary of the First Colour photograph
Most Inspirational	1,000 rouble, silver	Moscow Mint, Belarus	St Euphrosyne of Polotsk
Most Popular	1 dollar, copper, zinc, manganese, nickel	US Mint, United States of America	George Washington
People’s Choice	5,000 forint, silver	Magyar Pénzverő Zrt., Hungary	Castle of Gyula

=== 2008 (minted in 2006) ===
Category	Face value and metal	Executing company, issuing country	Topic
Coin of the Year	50 dollars, Palladium (Four Coin Set)	Royal Canadian Mint, Canada	Ursa Major and Ursa Minor Through the Seasons
Best Contemporary Event	1 Lats, silver	Latvia	Latvian Independence, 1918
Best Crown	10 euro, gold	Monnaie de Paris, France	Jules Verne, Five Weeks in a Balloon
Best Gold	100 euro, gold	Austrian Mint, Austria	The Rivergate of Vienna
Best Silver	1,000 Yen, silver	Japan Mint, Japan	50th anniversary of Japanese Entry into the United Nations
Best Trade	50 cent, clad	US Mint, United States of America	Nevada, the Silver State
Most Artistic	10 crowns, silver	Denmark	Hans Christian Andersen’s Snow Queen
Most Historically Significant	1 dollar, silver	US Mint, United States of America	Benjamin Franklin, Elder Statesman
Most Innovative	50 dollars, Palladium (Four Coin Set)	Royal Canadian Mint, Canada	Ursa Major and Ursa Minor Through the Seasons
Most Inspirational Coin	5 dollars, silver	Royal Canadian Mint, Canada	Imagine a World Without Breast Cancer
Most Inspirational Coin	5 euro, gold	Suomen Rahapaja, Finland	150th anniversary of the Demilitarization of Åland
Most Popular Coin	25 cent, clad	US Mint, United States of America	Nevada, the Silver State
People’s Choice	50 forint, copper–Nickel	Magyar Pénzverő Zrt., Hungary	50th anniversary of the Hungarian Revolution Against Soviet Occupation

=== 2007 (minted in 2005) ===
Category	Face value and metal	Executing company, issuing country	Topic
Coin of the Year	1 dollar, silver	US Mint, United States of America	U.S. Marine Corps
Best Contemporary Event	1 dollar, silver	Royal Australian Mint, Australia	End of World War II “Dancing Men”
Best Crown	1 dollar, silver	US Mint, United States of America	U.S. Marine Corps
Best Gold	100 euro, gold	Minted by all German mints, Germany	2006 FIFA World Cup
Best Silver	20 euro, silver	Austrian Mint, Austria	SMS Sankt Georg
Best Trade	25 cent, clad	US Mint, United States of America	Oregon, Crater Lake
Coin of the Year	1 dollar, silver	US Mint, United States of America	U.S. Marine Corps
Most Artistic	20 rouble, silver	Latvian Mint, Belarus	Easter Egg
Most Historically Significant	10 euro, silver	Landesbetrieb Hamburgische Münze, Germany	Albert Einstein, 100 Years Special Relativity
Most Innovative	1 dollar, silver	Royal Australian Mint, Australia	End of World War II “Dancing Men”
Most Inspirational	2 New sheqalim, silver	Israel Coins and Medals Corp., Israel	Moses and the 10 Commandments
Most Popular	5 cent, copper-Nickel	US Mint, United States of America	Bison

=== 2006 (minted in 2004) ===
Category	Face value and metal	Executing company, issuing country	Topic
Coin of the Year	5 euro, silver	Istituto Poligrafico e Zecca dello Stato, Italy	Madama Butterfly
Best Contemporary Event	50 pound sterling, silver	Royal Mint, Alderney	50th anniversary of D-Day Invasion of Normandy
Best Crown	1 pound, copper–Nickel	Cyprus	Triton sounding a conch
Best Gold	2,000 yuan, gold	China	Maijishan Grottoes
Best Silver	1 dollar, silver	Royal Australian Mint, Australia	Kangaroo
Best Trade	2 euro, bi-metallic	Greece	Olympic discus thrower
Most Artistic	5 euro, silver	Istituto Poligrafico e Zecca dello Stato, Italy	Madama Butterfly
Most Historically Significant	1 dollar, silver	US Mint, United States of America	125th anniversary of Edison's Electric Light
Most Innovative	10 dollars, silver	Coin Invest Trust, Liberia	Window with Tiffany glass inlay
Most Inspirational	20 zloty, silver	Mennica Polska, Poland	Victims of the Lodz Ghetto
Most Popular	1.5 euro, silver	Monnaie de Paris, France	100 Years FIFA

=== 2005 (minted in 2003) ===
Category	Face value and metal	Executing company, issuing country	Topic
Coin of the Year	100-rouble silver	Belarus	Belarus Ballet
Best Contemporary Event	2-pound Bi-metallic	United Kingdom	The discovery of DNA
Best Crown	20-rouble silver	Belarus	Mute swan
Best Gold	100-euro gold	Austria	Klmit's "The Kiss"
Best Silver	10-euro silver	Spain	75th anniversary of the school ship El Cano
Best Trade	5-euro Bi-metallic	Finland	Ice Hockey world championships
Most Artistic	100-rouble silver	Belarus	Belarus Ballet
Most Historically Significant	10-dollar silver	Australia	Evolution of the alphabet
Most Innovative	1 dollar silver, emerald	Cook Islands	Gemstone zodiac locket
Most Inspirational	50-cent cupronickel	Australia	Australia's volunteers
Most Popular	1 dollar Nickel, Brass	New Zealand	The Lord of the Rings

=== 2004 (minted in 2002) ===
Category	Face value and metal	Executing company, issuing country	Topic
Coin of the Year	5-euro silver	Austria	Schoenbrunn Zoo
Best Contemporary Event	5-pound gold	United Kingdom	50th anniversary of the reign of Queen Elizabeth II
Best Crown	1 dollar silver	United States of America	West Point Military Academy
Best Gold	50-euro gold	Austria	The Order of Saint Benedict and the Order of Saint Scholastica
Best Silver	10-euro silver	Austria	Ambras Palace
Best Trade	1 Real Bi-metallic	Brazil	Liberty
Most Artistic	1 Lats silver	Latvia	Destiny, roots
Most Historically Significant	25-cent clad	United States of America	Ohio, birthplace of aviation pioneers
Most Innovative	60-pence Bronze, silver	Isle of Man	Currency Converter
Most Inspirational	5-pound silver	United Kingdom	Princess Diana of Wales
Most Popular	5-euro silver	Austria	Schoenbrunn Zoo

=== 2003 (minted in 2001) ===
Category	Face value and metal	Executing company, issuing country	Topic
Coin of the Year	1 franc silver	France	The last franc
Best Contemporary Event	500-franc silver	Belgium	The birth of the European euro
Best Crown	1 dollar silver	Australia	Aboriginal kangaroo
Best Gold	500-yuan gold	China	Panda
Best Silver	20-yuan silver	China	Mogao grottoes
Best Trade	25-cent clad	United States of America	Rhode Island, the Ocean State
Most Artistic	25-rouble silver	Russia	225th anniversary of the Bolshoi Theater
Most Historically Significant	10-dollar silver	Australia	The evolution of the calendar
Most Innovative	1 france silver	France	The last franc
Most Inspirational	1 crown cupronickel	Gibraltar	Florence Nightingale
Most Popular	1 dollar silver	United States of America	Buffalo

=== 2002 (minted in 2000) ===
Category	Face value and metal	Executing company, issuing country	Topic
Coin of the Year	1 dollar silver	United States of America	Voyage of Leif Ericson
Best Contemporary Event	10-mark silver	Germany	10th anniversary of German reunification
Best Crown	100-schilling silver	Australia	Celtic heritage
Best Gold	200-dollar gold	Canada	Inuit mother and child
Best Silver	1 Onza silver	Mexico	Winged Victory
Best Trade	50-cent cupronickel	Australia	Visit by Queen Elizabeth II
Most Artistic	50-Lithu silver	Lithuania	Discus thrower
Most Historically Significant	1 silver dollar	United States of America	Voyage of Leif Ericson
Most Innovative	500-Yen Copper, zinc, nickel	Japan	Paulownia flower
Most Inspirational	50-dollar Aluminium, Bronze	Australia	Paralympics
Most Popular	1 dollar Copper, zinc, manganese, nickel	United States of America	Sacagawea

=== 2001 (minted in 1999) ===
Category	Face value and metal	Executing company, issuing country	Topic
Coin of the Year	5,000-Lire silver	Italy	World Encircled by Birds and Stars
Best Contemporary Event	50-schilling Bi-metallic	Austria	European Monetary Union
Best Crown	1 dollar silver	United States of America	Dolley Madison
Best Gold	10,000-Korun gold	Czech Republic	Charles IV
Best Silver	2-pound silver	United Kingdom	Britannia in Chariot
Best Trade	25-cent clad	United States of America	New Jersey, Crossroads of the Revolution
Most Artistic	5,000-Lire silver	Italy	World Encircled by Birds and Stars
Most Historically Significant	100-schilling silver	Austria	Assassination of Archduke Franz Ferdinand
Most Innovative	1 Lats silver	Latvia	Millennium, Button
Most Inspirational	10-Hyrven silver	Ukraine	Birth of Jesus
Most Popular	5-pound cupronickel	United Kingdom	Diana, Princess of Wales

=== 2000 (minted in 1998) ===
Category	Face value and metal	Executing company, issuing country	Topic
Coin of the Year	500-schilling silver	Austria	Book Printing
Best Contemporary Event	2-new sheqalim silver	Israel	50th anniversary of Israel
Best Crown	1,000-Escudos silver	Portugal	International Oceans Exposition
Best Gold	250-dollar gold	Singapore	Year of the tiger
Best Silver	500-schilling silver	Austria	Book Printing
Best Trade	50-schilling Bi-metallic	Austria	Austrian Presidency of the European Union
Most Artistic	10-Diners silver	Andorra	europa Driving a Quadriga
Most Historically Significant	200-Escudo cupronickel	Portugal	500th anniversary of the Voyage to India
Most Innovative	2-dollar, 2-dollar, 2-tala silver	Cook Islands, Fiji, Western Samoa	Tripartite Convention
Most Inspirational	14-euro silver	Bosnia-Herzegovina	Dove of peace
Most Popular	1 dollar silver	Canada	125th anniversary of the Royal Canadian Mounted Police

=== 1999 (minted in 1997) ===
Category	Face value and metal	Executing company, issuing country	Topic
Coin of the Year	1 rand silver	South Africa	Women of South Africa
Best Contemporary Event Coin	1 rand gold	South Africa	First Heart Transplant
Best Crown	2-pound silver	United Kingdom	Britannia
Best Gold	200-dollar gold	Canada	Haida Carved Mask
Best Silver	100-schilling silver	Austria	Emperor Maximilian of Mexico
Best Trade	2-Zloty Brass	Poland	Pieskowa Skala Castle
Most Artistic	1 rand silver	South Africa	Women of South Africa
Most Historically Significant	100-dollar gold	Canada	Alexander Graham Bell
Most Innovative	5-dollar silver	Kiribati and Western Samoa Joint Issue	War and Peace
Most Inspirational	10-Leon silver	Sierra Leone	Mother Teresa and Princess Diana
Most Popular	100-dollar Platinum	United States of America	Statue of Liberty, eagle

=== 1998 (minted in 1996) ===
Category	Face value and metal	Executing company, issuing country	Topic
Coin of the Year	60-dollar gold	Bermuda	Bermuda Triangle
Best Contemporary Event	14-euro silver	Bosnia-Herzegovina	Dayton Peace Accord
Best Crown	500-schilling silver	Austria	Innsbruck Town market
Best Gold	60-dollar gold	Bermuda	Bermuda Triangle
Best Silver	100-rouble silver	Russia	The Nutcracker Ballet, Marsha and the Nutcracker
Best Trade	2-dollar Bi-metallic	Canada	Polar Bear
Most Artistic	100-markkaa silver	Finland	Helene Schuerbeck
Most Historically Significant	30-new sheqalim silver	Israel	3000th anniversary of Jerusalem
Most Innovative	60-dollar gold	Bermuda	Bermuda Triangle
Most Inspirational	1 dollar silver	United States of America	Paralympics
Most Popular	2-dollar Bi-metallic	Canada	Polar bear

=== 1997 (minted in 1995) ===
Category	Face value and metal	Executing company, issuing country	Topic
Coin of the Year	100-markkaa silver	Finland	50th anniversary of the United Nations
Best Contemporary Event	100-rouble silver	Russia	50th anniversary of the End of World War II
Best Crown	200-schilling silver	Austria	Olympics, Ribbon Dancer
Best Gold	500-franc gold	France	50th anniversary of Victory in Europe (V.E.) Day
Best Silver	100-markkaa silver	Finland	50th anniversary of the United Nations
Best Trade	1 dollar Aluminum, Bronze	Australia	Waltzing Matilda
Most Artistic	100-markkaa silver	Finland	50th anniversary of the United Nations
Most Historically Significant	10-mark silver	Germany	centennial of the X-ray
Most Innovative	500-schilling Bi-metallic	Austria	Austria in the European Union
Most Inspirational	500-franc gold	France	50th anniversary of Victory in Europe (V.E.) Day
Most Popular	50-cent silver	United States of America	Olympic Baseball

=== 1996 (minted in 1994) ===
Category	Face value and metal	Executing company, issuing country	Topic
Coin of the Year	50-pence cupronickel	United Kingdom	50th anniversary of the Invasion of Normandy
Best Contemporary Event	50-pence cupronickel	United Kingdom	50th anniversary of the Invasion of Normandy
Best Crown	100-franc silver	France	Olympics, Javelin Thrower
Best Gold	1,000-schilling gold, silver	Austria	800th anniversary of the Vienna Mint
Best Silver	1,000-Lire silver	Italy	400th anniversary of Tintoretto
Best Trade	20-franc Tri-Metallic	France	Pierre de Coubertin
Most Artistic	100-markkaa silver	Finland	European Athletic Championships
Most Historically Significant	1 dollar silver	United States of America	Thomas Jefferson, Architect of Democracy
Most Innovative	5-dollar silver	Bahamas	Golf, Hole In One
Most Inspirational	300,000-zloty silver	Poland	Warsaw Ghetto Uprising
Most Popular	50-pence cupronickel	United Kingdom	50th anniversary of the Invasion of Normandy

=== 1995 (minted in 1993) ===
Category	Face value and metal	Executing company, issuing country	Topic
Coin of the Year	500-franc gold	France	Louvre Museum, Mona Lisa
Best Crown	10-dollar silver	Fiji	Captain William Bligh
Best Gold	500-franc gold	France	Louvre Museum, Mona Lisa
Best Silver	150-yuan silver	China	Peacocks
Best Trade	50-Korun Bi-metallic	Czech Republic	Prague City
Most Artistic	500-schilling silver	Austria	Halstatt
Most Historically Significant	1 franc silver	France	D-Day
Most Innovative	20-Diner European Currency Unit silver	Andorra	Saint George
Most Inspirational	300,000-zloty silver	Poland	Warsaw Ghetto Uprising
Most Popular	1 crown cupronickel	Gibraltar	Stegosaurus

=== 1994 (minted in 1992) ===
Category	Face value and metal	Executing company, issuing country	Topic
Coin of the Year	500-Lire silver	Italy	Flora and Fauna
Best Crown	100-schilling silver	Austria	Kaiser Karl V
Best Gold	5-dollar gold	United States of America	Christopher Columbus
Best Silver	2,000-Peseta silver	Spain	Barcelona Olympics
Best Trade	20-franc Tri-Metallic	France	Mont Saint Michel
Most Artistic	500-Lire silver	Italy	Flora and Fauna
Most Historically Significant	1 rouble cupronickel	Russia	Rebirth of Sovereignty
Most Innovative	20-franc Tri-Metallic	France	Mont Saint Michel
Most Popular	1 dollar silver	United States of America	White House
Special Recognition for Merit of Design	2-rand silver	South Africa	Minting Process

=== 1993 (minted in 1991) ===
Category	Face value and metal	Executing company, issuing country	Topic
Coin of the Year	500-Lire silver	Italy	2,100th anniversary of the Ponte Milvio Bridge
Best Crown	100-franc silver	France	Olympics, Ski Jump
Best Gold	100,000-Yen gold	Japan	Enthronement of the Emperor
Best Silver	10-Leke silver	Albania	Olympics, Equestrian
Best Trade	200-Escudo Aluminum, Bronze, cupronickel	Portugal	Garcia De Orta
Most Artistic	500-Lire silver	Italy	2,100th anniversary of the Ponte Milvio Bridge
Most Historically Significant	3-rouble silver	Russia	Yuri Gagarin, First Man in Space
Most Innovative	10-Leke silver	Albania	Olympics, Equestrian
Most Popular	5-dollar silver	Australia	Kookaburra

=== 1992 (minted in 1990) ===
Category	Face value and metal	Executing company, issuing country	Topic
Coin of the Year	1 crown cupronickel	Isle of Man	Penny Black
Best Crown	1 crown cupronickel	Isle of Man	Penny Black
Best Gold	25-rouble Palladium	Russia	Peter the Great
Best Silver	100-franc silver	France	Charlemagne
Best Trade	5-Kroner cupronickel	Denmark	Queen Margrethe II Mongram
Most Artistic	100-markka silver	Finland	50th anniversary of Veterans
Most Historically Significant	20-mark cupronickel	Germany	Opening of the Brandenburg Gate
Most Innovative	1 crown cupronickel	Isle of Man	Penny Black
Most Popular	1 crown silver	Isle of Man	Alley Cat
Special Recognition for Merit of Design	50-cent cupronickel	New Zealand	150th anniversary of Waitangi

=== 1991 (minted in 1989) ===
Category	Face value and metal	Executing company, issuing country	Topic
Coin of the Year	5-franc cupronickel	France	Eiffel Tower
Best Crown	5,000-Peseta silver	Spain	500th anniversary of the discovery of America
Best Gold	2,000-schilling gold	Austria	Vienna Philharmonic Orchestra
Best Silver	1 dollar silver, 25-cent silver	Australia	Crocodiles (“Holey), Aboriginal Mythology (“Dump”)
Best Trade	5-franc cupronickel	France	Eiffel Tower
Most Artistic	5-franc cupronickel, 5-pound gold, 2-new sheqalim silver	France, United Kingdom, Israel	Eiffel Tower, 500th anniversary of the gold Sovereign, 41st anniversary of Israel
Most Historically Significant	1 Sovereign gold	United Kingdom	500th anniversary of the gold Sovereign
Most Popular	5-franc cupronickel	France	Eiffel Tower

=== 1990 (minted in 1988) ===
Category	Face value and metal	Executing company, issuing country	Topic
Coin of the Year	50-Leke silver	Albania	Railroads
Best Crown	500-forint silver	Hungary	25th anniversary of the World Wildlife Fund
Best Gold	100-pound gold	Egypt	golden Warrior
Best Silver	100-yuan silver	China	Year of the dragon
Best Trade	50-cent cupronickel	Australia	Bicentennial of Australia
Most Artistic	5-franc cupronickel	Switzerland	Olympics, Dove and Rings
Most Historically Significant	500-forint silver	Hungary	950th anniversary of Saint Stephen
Most Innovative	50-Leke silver	Albania	Railroads
Most Popular	1 dollar silver	United States of America	Olympics, 1988, Rings and Wreath

=== 1989 (minted in 1987) ===
Category	Face value and metal	Executing company, issuing country	Topic
Coin of the Year	100-pound gold	United Kingdom	Britannia
Best Crown	50-dollar silver	Cook Islands	Olympics, Seoul Games
Best Gold	100-pound gold	United Kingdom	Britannia
Best Silver	1 dollar silver	Canada	400th anniversary of the Davis Straight
Best Trade	5-franc cupronickel	Switzerland	centennial of Le Corbusier
Most Artistic	100-pound gold	United Kingdom	Britannia
Most Historically Significant	1 dollar clad, 5-dollar gold	United States of America	Bicentennial of the United States’ Constitution
Most Popular	1 dollar clad, 5-dollar gold	United States of America	Bicentennial of the United States’ Constitution

=== 1988 (minted in 1986) ===
Category	Face value and metal	Executing company, issuing country	Topic
Coin of the Year	5-dollar gold	United States of America	Bicentennial of the Statue of Liberty
Best Crown	1 dollar silver	Canada	centennial of Vancouver
Best Gold	100,000-Yen gold	Japan	60th year of the reign of Emperor Hirohito
Best Silver	1 dollar silver	Canada	centennial of Vancouver
Best Trade	500-Yen cupronickel	Japan	60th year of the reign of Emperor Hirohito
Most Artistic	25-tala silver	Western Samoa	Voyage of the Kon-Tiki
Most Historically Significant	500-schilling silver	Austria	500th anniversary of the Striking of the First Thaler Coin
Most Popular	5-dollar gold	United States of America	Bicentennial of the Statue of Liberty

=== 1987 (minted in 1985) ===
Category	Face value and metal	Executing company, issuing country	Topic
Coin of the Year	50-markkaa silver	Finland	Kalevala National Epic
Best Crow	50-markkaa silver	Finland	Kalevala National Epic
Best Gold	5-pound gold	United Kingdom	Saint George Slaying the Dragon
Best Silver	50-markkaa silver	Finland	Kalevala National Epic
Best Trade	1 dollar copper, aluminum, nickel	Australia	Kangaroos
Most Artistic	50-markkaa silver	Finland	Kalevala National Epic
Most Historically Significant	500-schilling silver 100-Rupee silver	Austria, India	2000th anniversary of Bregenz, Indira Gandhi memorial
Most Popular	20-dollar silver	Canada	Olympics, 1988, Downhill Skiing

=== 1986 (minted in 1984) ===
Category	Face value and metal	Executing company, issuing country	Topic
Coin of the Year	100-dollar gold	Canada	450th anniversary of Jacques Cartier's voyage of discovery
Best Crown	10-dollar silver	Barbados	Three Dolphins
Best Gold Coin	100-dollar gold 1 Angel gold	Canada, Isle of Man	450th anniversary of Jacques Cartier's voyage of discovery, Archangel Michael Slaying the Dragon
Best Silver	20-balboa silver	Panama	Balboa discovers the Pacific Ocean
Most Artistic	20-balboa silver	Panama	Balboa discovers the Pacific Ocean
Most Historically Significant	100-franc silver 100-dollar gold	France, Canada	Two Time Nobel Prize Winner Marie Curie, 450th anniversary of Jacques Cartier's voyage of discovery
Most Popular	1 dollar silver	United States of America	Olympics, XXIII Olympic Games in Los Angeles, California

=== 1985 (minted in 1983) ===
Category	Face value and metal	Executing company, issuing country	Topic
Coin of the Year	1 dollar silver	United States of America	Olympics, discus thrower
Best Crown	1 dollar silver	United States of America	Olympics, discus thrower
Best Gold	100-pound gold 100-yuan gold	Egypt, China	Cleopatra VII, panda
Best Silver	10-yuan silver	China	Panda and cub
Most Artistic	5-dollar silver	British Virgin Islands	Yellow warbler
Most Historically Significant	5-yuan silver	China	Marco Polo
Most Popular	1 dollar silver	United States of America	Olympics, discus thrower

=== 1984 (minted in 1982) ===
Category	Face value and metal	Executing company, issuing country	Topic
Coin of the Year	50-cent silver	United States of America	250th anniversary of the birth of George Washington
Best Crown	20-yuan silver	China	Year of the dog
Best Gold	100-dollar gold	Canada	New constitution, 1982
Best Silver	20-balboa silver	Panama	Balboa's discovery of the Pacific Ocean
Most Artistic	100-dollar gold	Canada	New constitution, 1982
Most Historically Significant	50-cent silver	United States of America	250th anniversary of the birth of George Washington
Most Popular	50-cent silver	United States of America	250th anniversary of the birth of George Washington
