= Samlerhuset =

Samlerhuset Norge (Collector's House) is a Norwegian distributor of collectibles, mainly coins and medals, but also stamps, banknotes and philatelic numismatic covers (PNC). Samlerhuset is located in Oppegård, Norway. The company, with the full name Samlerhuset Norge, is part of the Samlerhuset Group B.V., headquartered in Almere, the Netherlands. Samlerhuset was founded in Norway in 1994, and started expanding to several countries in Europe and to China. Samlerhuset Group B.V. now have offices in 16 countries. They cooperate with a number of central banks on commemorative coins and coin collections.

== Company ==
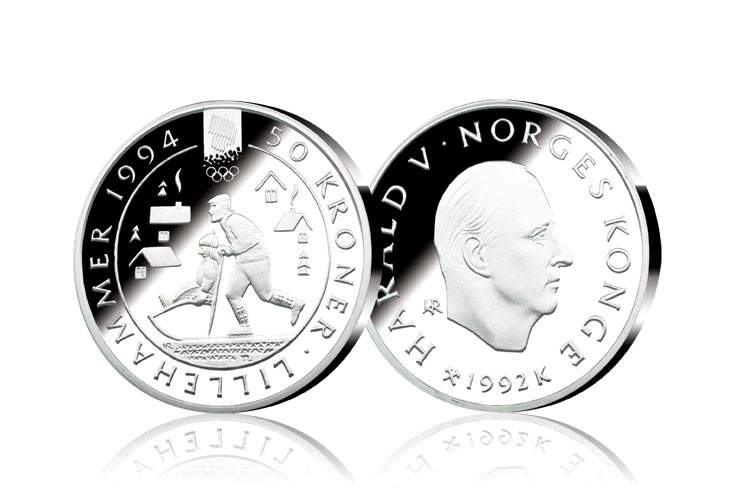
Samlerhuset sells collectibles, including the sale of commemorative coins such as this coin, commemorating the 1994 Winter Olympics.

Samlerhuset Norge is located at Rosenholm Campus in Oppegård, immediately south of the Oslo/Oppegård border, close by Rosenholm Station. As of 2016, the company has some 90 employees.

Samlerhuset states on their own website that their purpose is to help "create joy of collecting and satisfied collectors through exciting collectibles". More to the point, their brochure states that:

"Samlerhuset's key business activity is the direct marketing of coins and commemorative medals, and other related collectibles, to national markets, using a strong analysis platform to closely identify customer requirements and preferences. The Group's main aims are to help central banks and government mints reach out to collectors across the globe with commemorative coins and collectors´ items [and t]o help collectors gain access to limited mintage and soughtafter coins, whether they are professionals with a wide knowledge of collecting, or less experienced collectors".

Samlerhuset Norge sells both Norwegian and foreign coins, bank notes and stamps. They also publish the numismatic magazine "Mynt & Historie". The magazine is issued by Samlerhuset, but uses a number of external writers, including curator of the British Museum Gareth Williams.

Samlerhuset Norge is part of Samlerhuset Group B.V., and the only part of the company with the name Samlerhuset in it. Samlerhuset Group has offices in Sweden (Mynthuset Sverige AB), Denmark (Mønthuset Danmark A/S), Finland (Soumen Moneta/Oy Nordic Moneta AB), Estonia (Eesti Mündiari OÜ), Latvia (Latvijas Monetu Nams, SIA), Lithuania (UAB Monetų namai), Poland (Skarbnica Narodowa), Czech Republic (Nárdoni Pokladnice s.r.o.), The United Kingdom (The London Mint Office Limited), Slovakia (Nárdona Pokladnica s.r.o), Hungary (Magyar Éremkibocsátó Kft.), Ireland (Dublin Mint Office), Belgium (Het Belgische Munthuis - La Maison de la Monnaie Belge) and China. Samlerhuset Group's headquarters are located in Almere, Netherlands.

Samlerhuset Norge is the sole owner of Det Norske Myntverket, (Norwegian Mint) after Norwegian authorities decided to privatize the Royal Norwegian Mint.

== Company history ==
Samlerhuset was established in 1994 by Reidar Nilsen, Sigmund Jakobsen, Ole Bjørn Fausa and Helge Hellebust. Nilsen and Fausa are still owners of both Samlerhuset Norge and Samlerhuset Group. In 1997, Samlerhuset branched out and established Mynthuset Sverige AB in Sweden. Three years later, in 2000, they started cooperating with the Mint of Finland, and in 2001 they merged with MDM Group, becoming Samlerhuset Group. MDM Group already covered The Netherlands, Austria and a minor company in United Kingdom. Samlerhuset demerged from MDM Group in 2008.

In 2001, Norges Bank, the central bank of Norway, spun off the Royal [Norwegian] Mint as a private company. Samlerhuset and the Mint of Finland bought the company in 2003 and changed its name to The Norwegian Mint. In 2015 Samlerhuset Norge bought out the Mint of Finland, becoming the sole owner of the Norwegian Mint.

== Activities ==
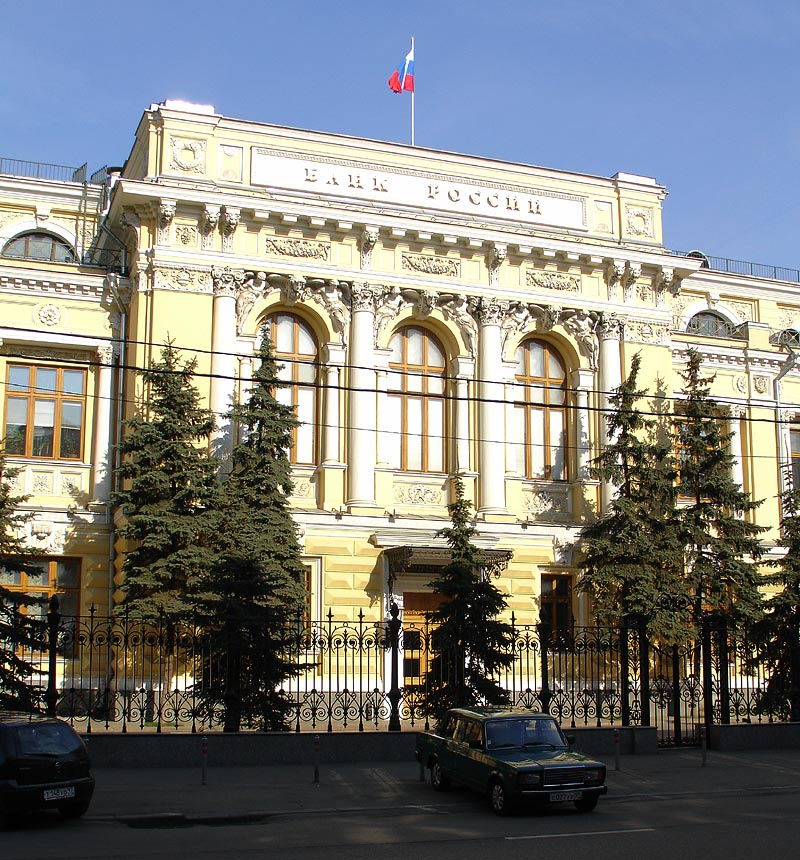
The Central Bank of Russia is one of several central banks cooperating with Samlerhuset Norge and Samlerhuset Group in the production of coins.

In addition to selling coins, medals, banknotes, PNCs and stamps, Samlerhuset is the official distributor of coins for a number of central banks and mints, including Royal Mint, Monnaie de Paris, National Bank of Poland, Mint of Finland, Perth Mint, Münze Österreich, Czech National Bank, National Bank of Slovakia, Central Bank of Ireland, Israel Coins and Medals Corp., Banco de México, Imprensa Nacional-Casa da Moeda, Central Bank of Russia, South African Mint, The Royal Mint of Spain, Royal Dutch Mint, Royal Canadian Mint and People's Bank of China. The cooperation largely concerns commemorative coins and coin collections.

In 2020 Samlerhuset's CEO denied media reports that the Dublin Mint Office had sent expensive unsolicited products to elderly Irish customers during the COVID-19 lockdown.

Samlerhuset also cooperates with a number of different sports organizations for specific events. They have been a partner for commemorative coins for all Olympic Games since the 1996 Summer Olympics. Their presently greatest contract was the commemorative coins for the 2006 FIFA World Cup.

=== Other activities ===
Samlerhuset has engaged in a number of activities not directly associated with their main activities. These include exhibitions, monuments and archaeological projects.

==== Exhibitions ====
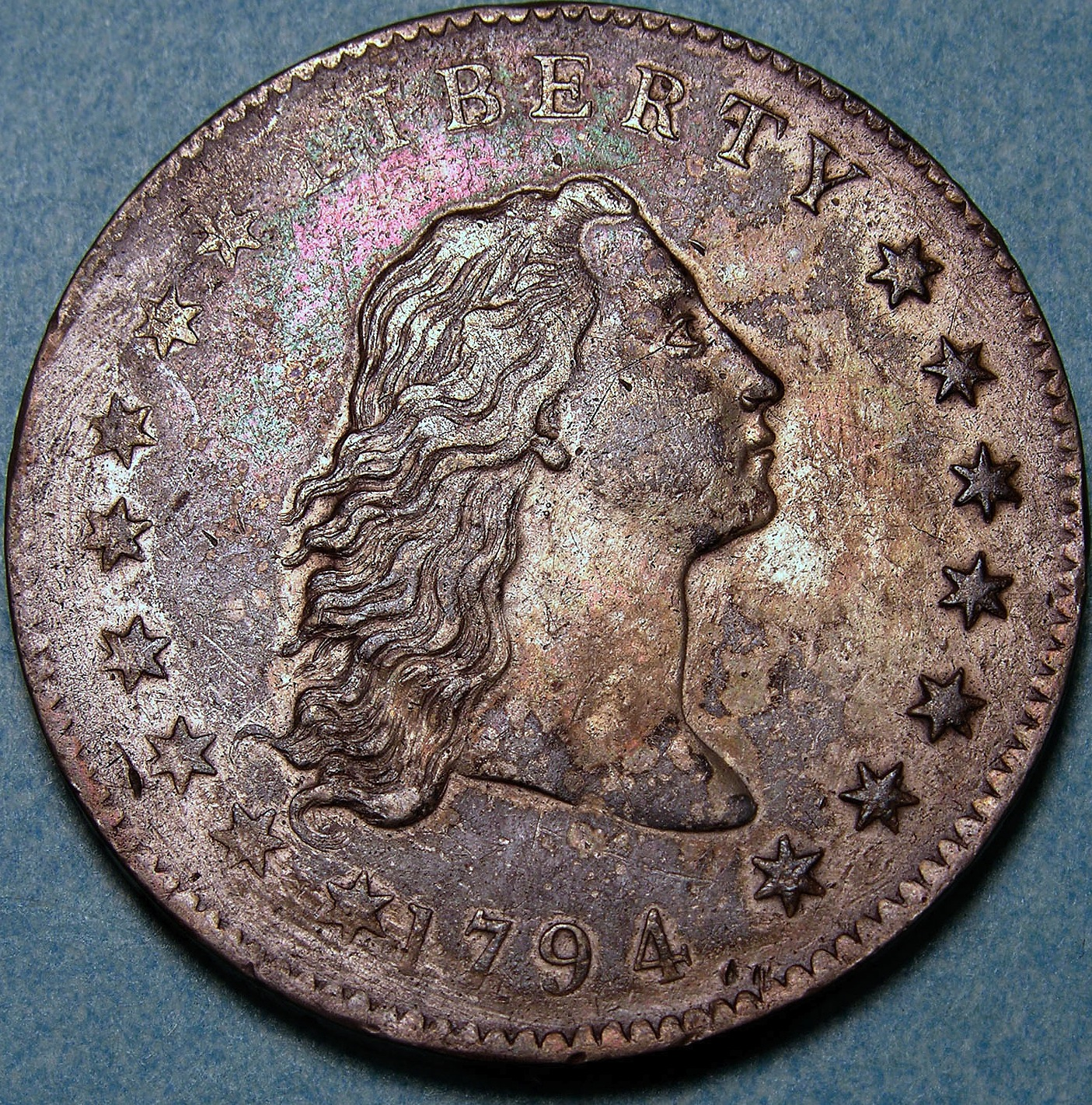
«Flowing hair dollar», Flowing Hair dollar, the first dollar coin issued by the United States federal government, was exhibited at Historisk museum (Museum of History) in Oslo.

Samlerhuset has been involved in a number of exhibitions of money and valuables in Norway and Europe, including:

- The Brussels Hoard, February 2004: The exhibition, dubbed "The largest medieval coin hoard in Europe", was a cooperation between Samlerhuset and the Ashmolean Museum of Oxford. The exhibition produced a leaflet written by professor Nicholas Mayhew at Oxford University in cooperation to professor Svein Gullbekk at the University of Oslo.
- The biggest gold coin in the world, March 2009: The biggest gold coin, produced by Perth Mint, was exhibited at the Grand Hotel in Oslo.
- The 1933 double eagle, March 2012: The double eagle ($20) gold coin, arguably the most expensive gold coin ever, was exhibited in Europe for the first time. Samlerhuset financed the exhibition in Norway, taking place at Kulturhistorisk museum (Museum of Cultural history) in Oslo.
- «Flowing Hair Dollar»/United States Declaration of Independence, March 2016: The first dollar coin issued by the United States federal government (1794), dubbed the «Flowing Hair Dollar», was exhibited at Historisk Museum (Museum of History). At the same exhibition, one of the earliest copies of the United States Declaration of Independence was on display. Both were on loan from the Smithsonian Institution.

==== Monuments ====
- Max Manus June 7, 2011: Samlerhuset financed the production of a statue of the resistance fighter Max Manus. It was originally placed at Aker Brygge, but was moved as members of the Pelle group protested, as the sabotages that happened there were by them. The Statue was swiftly moved some hundred metres to the Akershus Fortress.
- Pelle group, November 2013: Samlerhuset and the Municipality of Oslo shared the financing of a monument to the Pelle group, a Norwegian resistance group somewhat inaccurately regarded as "communist" and largely unrecognized to that point. The unveiling was witnessed by Haakon, Crown Prince of Norway and the mayor of Oslo.
- Krigsseilerregisteret, January 2016: (directly: The War Sailor Registry) Samlerhuset financed the registry, whose purpose it is to document all Norwegian sailors who did service on merchant ships during World War II. The sailors partaking in the merchant fleet were largely forgotten, ignored and not given money due for a long time after World War II.

==== Other projects ====
- Funn i Hafrsfjord, September 2017: A voluntary association, Foreningen Funn i Hafrsfjord started their project to examine the contents of the bottom of Hafrsfjord for traces after the Battle of Hafrsfjord, which according to Medieval sources was the start of the first unification of Norway. Samlerhuset was among its main sponsors.
- Samlerhuset has also been a sponsor for the local team Follo Fotball from 2011 to 2017.
