= List of euro mints =

Several mints exist in the eurozone that produce euro coins. Not every eurozone member state has its own mint.

== Austria ==
The Austrian Mint in Vienna produces Austrian euro coins.

== Belgium ==
The Royal Mint of Belgium produced Belgian euro coins until 2017. However, since 2018, Belgian euro coins have been produced by the Royal Dutch Mint in the Netherlands.

== Bulgaria ==
The Bulgarian Mint produces Bulgarian euro coins.

== Croatia ==
The Croatian Mint in Sveta Nedelja produces Croatian euro coins.

== Finland ==
The Mint of Finland, with production facilities in Finland and Germany, mints Finnish euro coins. It has also minted euro coins for Cyprus, Estonia, Greece, Ireland, Luxembourg, and Slovenia.

== France ==
The Monnaie de Paris in Pessac is the exclusive producer of French euro coins. It also mints Monégasque euro coins and alternates with the Spanish Royal Mint for the production of Andorran euro coins. It has also minted Greek euro coins, Luxembourg euro coins, and Maltese euro coins.

== Germany ==
The two mints of the Staatliche Münzen Baden-Württemberg in Stuttgart and Karlsruhe have minted over 40% of the German euro coins in circulation.

The Bavarian State Mint in Munich mints about 21% of circulating German euro coins.

The Staatliche Münze Berlin produces about one-fifth of German euro coinage.

The remaining roughly one-fifth of German euro coinage is minted at the Hamburgische Münze in Hamburg.

== Greece ==
The Greek Mint, a facility of the Bank of Greece, produces Greek euro coins. It has also minted Cypriot euro coins.

== Ireland ==
The Irish Mint (Currency Centre) in Sandyford, Dublin strikes the Irish euro coins.

== Italy ==
The Istituto Poligrafico e Zecca dello Stato in Rome mints Italian euro coins, Sammarinese euro coins, and Vatican euro coins.

== Lithuania ==
The Lithuanian Mint in Vilnius mints Lithuanian euro coins.

== Netherlands ==
The Royal Dutch Mint in Utrecht is the sole producer of Dutch euro coins. It also produces Belgian euro coins and has produced some Estonian euro coins, Luxembourg euro coins, Maltese euro coins, and Slovenian euro coins.

== Portugal ==
The Imprensa Nacional-Casa da Moeda in Lisbon mints Portuguese euro coins.

== Slovakia ==
The Kremnica Mint in Kremnica mints Slovak euro coins. It has also produced Slovenian euro coins.

== Spain ==
The Royal Mint in Madrid produces Spanish euro coins. It alternates with the Monnaie de Paris in France for the production of Andorran euro coins. It also minted some early Greek euro coins.
