= Royal Mint (disambiguation) =

Royal Mint can refer to any number of mints with a royal patronage, mints that have a Royal prefix include:

- Royal Mint (United Kingdom)
- Royal Australian Mint (Australia)
- Royal Belgian Mint (Belgium)
- Royal Canadian Mint (Canada)
- Royal Danish Mint (Denmark)
- Royal Dutch Mint (Netherlands)
- Royal Hungarian State Mint, now known as the Hungarian Mint
- Royal Mint of Malaysia (Malaysia)
- Royal Mint (Spain)
- Royal Norwegian Mint (Norway)
- Royal Thai Mint (Thailand)
