= Hamburgische Münze =

Coordinates: 53.6244°N 10.1538°E

The Hamburgische Münze is a state-owned coin mint in Hamburg, Germany. It is one of five state mints that produce coins for the Federal Republic of Germany.

The first coinage in Hamburg is dated to 834 CE, and the mint describes itself as the oldest operating mint in Germany. The mint has used the 'J' mint mark since 1875.

Among the mint's early Reich issues were 10- and 20-mark gold coins. The coinage law of 1871 set weight limits for these coins and distinguished ordinary wear from deliberate reductions in weight.

The Hamburg mint became associated with the Doppelkronensache ("double-crown affair"), which concerned underweight 20-mark pieces discovered in Lübeck in 1877. The coins were traced to payment circuits through the Port of Hamburg. They had been reduced after minting rather than struck underweight. Histories of the mint describe the affair as a serious blow to its standing during the early imperial period.

The mint began producing euro coins in 1998, and its output reached 3.57 billion by 2002.

== See also ==
- Staatliche Münzen Baden-Württemberg
- Bavarian Central Mint
- Staatliche Münze Berlin
- German euro coins
- List of euro mints
- Hamburg
