= Italian Court =

Palace in the Czech Republic

- Vlašský dvůr
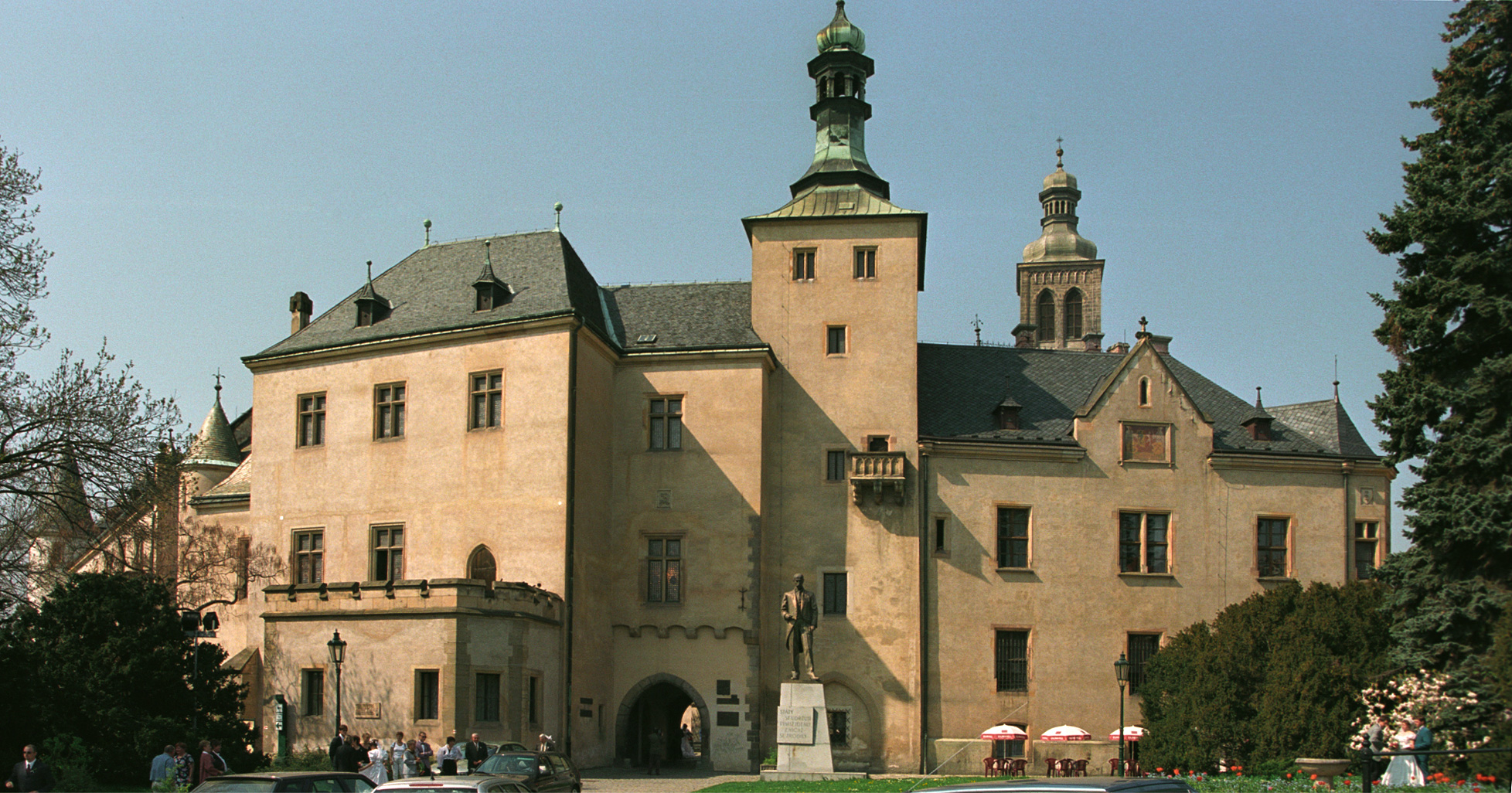
- Italian Court in Kutná Hora
- Interactive map of the Italian Court area

General information
- Type: Palace; former royal mint; former royal residence
- Location: Kutná Hora, Czech Republic
- Coordinates: 49°56′54″N 15°16′7″E
- Construction started: late 13th century

The Italian Court (Czech: Vlašský dvůr) is a palace in Kutná Hora in the Czech Republic. Originally, it was the seat of the Central Mint of Prague; it was named after the Italian experts who were at the forefront of the minting reform. The main area of the mint consisted of coin-makers-workshops, or Smithies, which were located around the courtyard, and the minting chamber, called “Preghaus”, where the Prague groschen were struck. After its reconstruction at the end of the 14th century, the Italian Court became a part-time royal residence.

== History ==
For many centuries, the Italian Court was the centre of the state economic power: it contained the royal mint and was the residence of the king during his visits to Kutná Hora silver mines. The history of the building reaches back to the late 13th century, when it served the function of a town castle: a safe storehouse of the silver ore and an important part of the town fortifications. It was separated from the town itself by moats, which survive in the lower section as cellars; the water in the moat also protected the castle from fires.

Following the reform of the mints by King Wenceslas II, all of the previously functioning coinage-works were situated in the Italian Court and coins of a unified value "the Prague groschen" began to be struck. During the 14th century the castle was completely rebuilt; although the greatest flourishing of the building activity came at the end of the century, under the reign of Wenceslas IV. The reconstruction was done by the workshop of Peter Parler, which was then completing the church of St. James and starting his work on St Barbara's Church.

The royal mint and the office of the supreme master minter came to an end in the 18th century after the great fire of 1770; the town hall was relocated into the Italian Court.

== Present ==
Currently, the building serves as a museum of coin minting; the most interesting interiors, such as the royal chapel and hall of audience are open to the public.

Inside the authentic cellars here is the museum "Unveiling of the mysterious face of Kutná Hora."

The building is depicted in the video game Kingdom Come: Deliverance II, set in the Kingdom of Bohemia during the 15th century.
