= Doppelkronensache =

1877 German gold coin affair

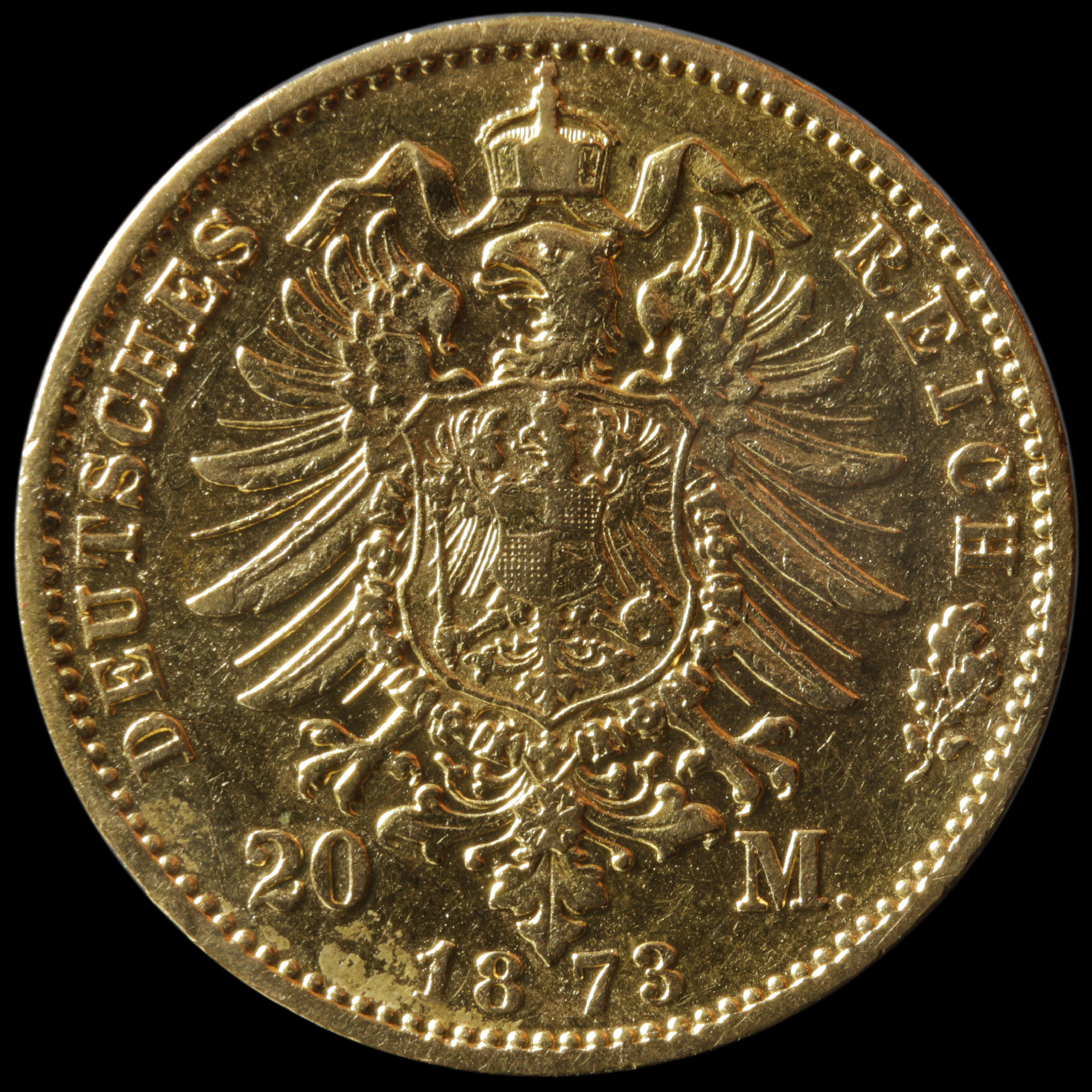
A 20-mark gold piece of the German Empire. Coins of this denomination, known as Doppelkronen, were the object of the affair.

The Doppelkronensache ("double-crown affair") was the systematic reduction in weight of German imperial gold coins carried out between Hamburg and Lübeck from about 1875 to 1877. The affair was settled out of court in January 1878 amid international monetary tension, when Germany's recent currency reform was still considered insecure. Those behind it were never identified. Because the manipulated coins stayed above the minimum weight and looked unremarkable on their own, the loss fell to the Reich under the rules for ordinary wear. Günter Pusback and Clas Abels rank it among the worst blows to the Hamburg mint's standing in its early imperial years.

== Method ==
A Doppelkrone weighed 7.965 g; its least current weight, the floor below which it started losing value, was 7.9251 g, and the minting tolerance was 2.5 thousandths, about 20 mg. Sweating the coins in bags took off 20 to 35 mg a pass, which still left them above the least current weight and unremarkable one at a time. Section 150 of the Reich Criminal Code prohibited clipping, filing, or otherwise reducing domestic or foreign coins and then passing them at full value. Schneider treats the Doppelkronensache as a violation of this provision. In Hamburg's forwarding and stevedoring trade, the circuit of loading charges and wage payments let the same coins go through repeatedly. The statutory conversion rate was 1,392 marks per pound fine. At some 25 mg (seven pfennigs) a pass, roughly 180,000 passes since 1875 were reported to have yielded four to five kilograms of fine gold, worth 11,000 to 14,000 marks.

== Discovery ==
The shortfall came to light at Lübeck in October 1877. The closer investigation was prompted by an unusually large deposit at a Lübeck cash office. The Wippe, a tipping lever balance, in use there since the winter of 1875–76, was set to the least current weight, and the coins passed. Only the reweighing of 1,912 Doppelkronen from one depositor revealed the manipulation: though issued in different years, their weights clustered unusually narrowly. Ordinary wear varies widely. On the contemporary assumption that a coin took fifty years in circulation to reach the least current weight, four years account for only a few milligrams.

== Settlement and aftermath ==
On 31 January 1878 the matter was settled out of court. The coins complained of were taken back at face value and the affair kept confidential. Neither the individuals nor the firms responsible became known, and the official files of the Reichsbank branch are also lost, having been burned in 1902 in a routine destruction of records. The imperial judicature acts also ended the Higher Court of Appeal of the Free Hanseatic Cities at Lübeck on 1 October 1879. According to Adolf Hertz, the public prosecutor's empire-wide duty to prosecute would have made a comparable settlement considerably more difficult. (Note: In the original German: "Welche praktische Tragweite der damit ausgesprochenen Bindung der Anklagebehörde zukam, erhellt namentlich aus denjenigen Fällen, in denen vor dem Inkrafttreten der Reichsstrafprozeßordnung noch eine durch Zweckmäßigkeitsrücksichten bestimmte Erledigung möglich gewesen war. So konnte die zu Anfang des Jahres 1878 beigelegte Doppelkronensache durch Rücknahme der beanstandeten Stücke zum vollen Nennwerte und unter Vermeidung eines öffentlichen Strafverfahrens erledigt werden; die nunmehr in § 152 Abs. 2 StPO reichseinheitlich festgelegte Verfolgungspflicht der Staatsanwaltschaft hätte eine vergleichbare Erledigung, wenn nicht schlechthin ausgeschlossen, so doch erheblich erschwert. Denn die Entscheidung, von der Verfolgung aus politischen, fiskalischen oder sonstigen Rücksichten auf öffentliche Interessen abzusehen, sollte damit grundsätzlich der freien Entschließung der Anklagebehörde entzogen sein.")

The affair coincided with the Hamburg mint's first years of imperial coin production. In their histories of the institution, Günter Pusback and Clas Abels present the Doppelkronensache as one of the gravest blows to the mint's standing during this early period. Schneider similarly frames it as a sign that Hamburg's switch to the Reich gold currency was complete in law before it was complete in practice.

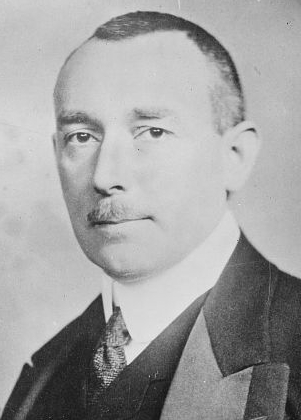
Karl Helfferich, who wrote in 1898 that the German monetary reform had not yet been secured in 1877/78.

== Monetary context ==
The settlement came at a time of international monetary tension: in 1878 the Bland–Allison Act forced silver coinage in the United States and the Paris monetary conference met on currency questions. A scandal over manipulated imperial gold would have put further strain on the young German gold currency, and according to Schneider, it was precisely that risk which kept the matter out of formal proceedings and led to a confidential settlement instead. Helfferich held that the reform had not yet been secured in 1877/78. (Note: In the original German: "Hierbei bleibt jedoch ein Umstand außer Rechnung, dessen Bedeutung sich nicht nach dem späteren Zustande bemessen läßt. Die deutsche Münzreform war vielmehr, trotz der in ihrer Durchführung bis dahin erreichten Fortschritte, auch 1877/78 noch nicht gesichert; was Mißtrauen gegen die Vollwichtigkeit der neuen Goldstücke zu erwecken vermochte, traf daher nicht einen fertigen Währungszustand, sondern eine noch in der Durchführung begriffene Umgestaltung. Auch in diesem Punkte wird das spätere Ergebniß stillschweigend unter die Voraussetzungen der damaligen Politik aufgenommen.") Silver released by the demonetisation of the old silver coinages could only be sold at a loss on a falling world market, and sales stopped in 1879. By the end of 1878 gold coins of about 1.67 billion marks in face value had been struck.

Under section 9 of the coinage law of 1871 the Reich bore the losses of ordinary wear, which could not be reliably distinguished from deliberate weight reduction. The gold removed by abrasion could be melted into bar gold and exchanged at the Reichsbank for banknotes; the Reich thus, as Abels put it, bought back gold from its own manipulated coins. (Note: In the original German: "Das abgeriebene Gold konnte, zu Barren geschmolzen, bei der Reichsbank gegen Banknoten eingewechselt werden. Damit kaufte das Reich Gold aus seinen eigenen manipulierten Münzen zurück. Wer die Stücke abgerieben hatte, wurde für das entnommene Gold bezahlt; für das Mindergewicht der Münzen kam wiederum das Reich auf.")

== See also ==
- Kipper und Wipper – earlier German coin-weight manipulation
- Great Recoinage of 1696 – response to clipped and underweight coinage
