= Staatliche Münze Berlin =

Coordinates: 52.5728°N 13.3304°E

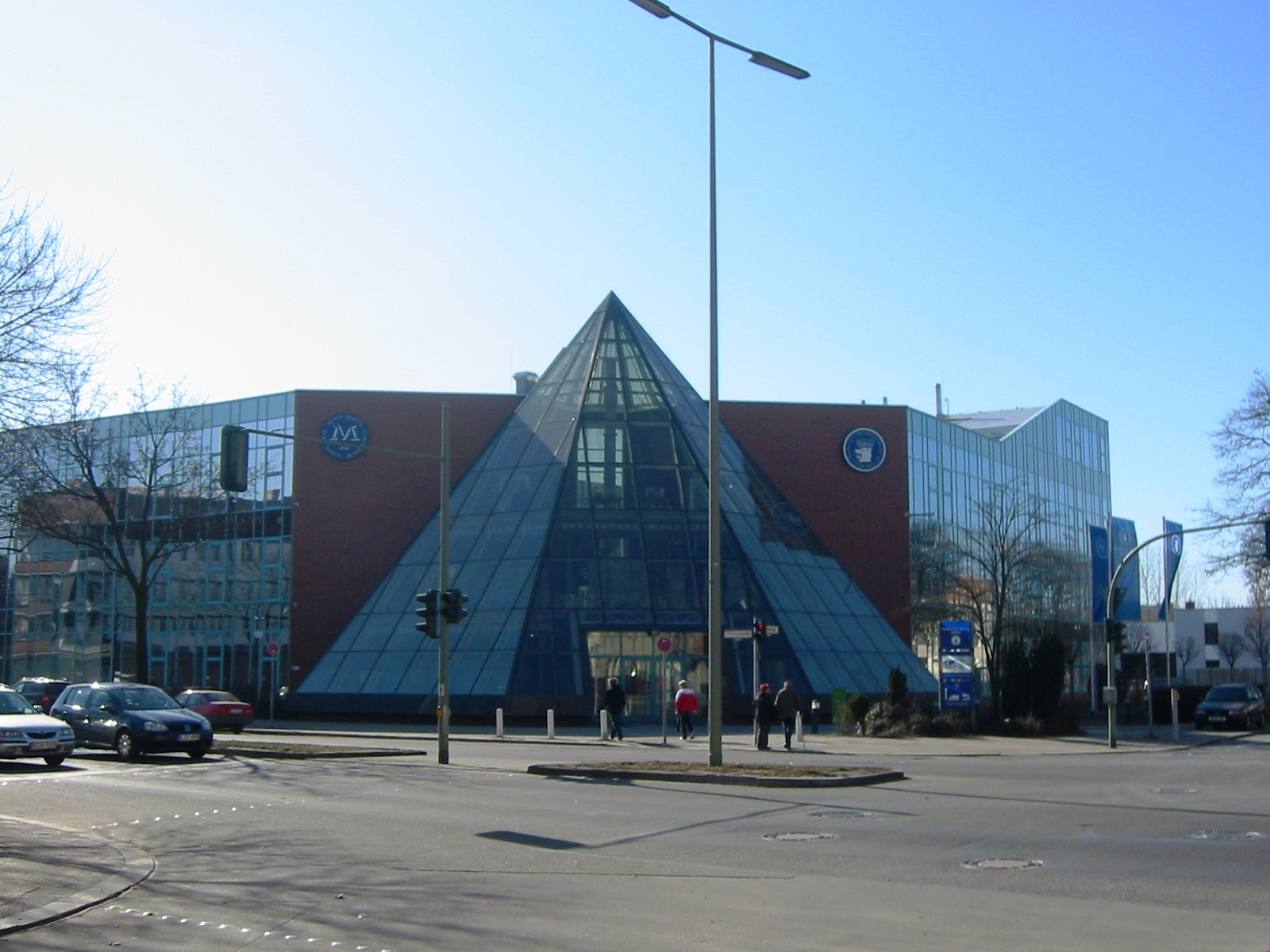
Exterior of the Staatliche Münze Berlin in 2011

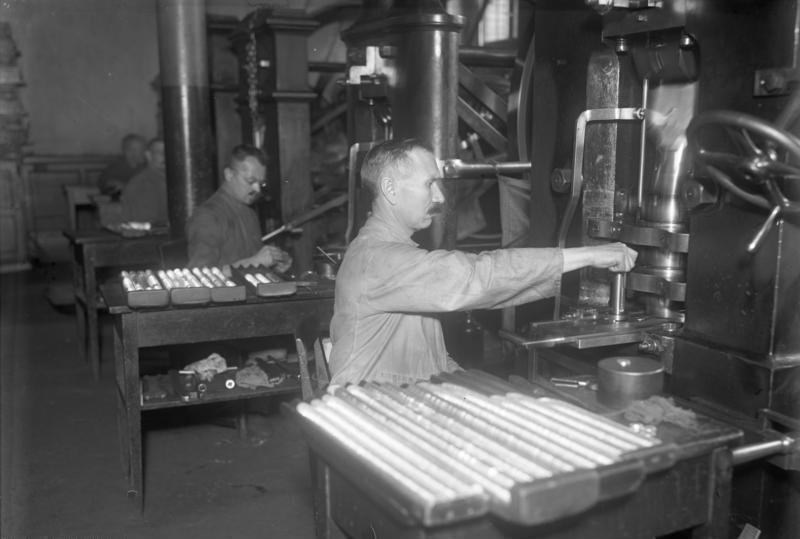
Employees striking coins in the Berlin mint in 1930

The Staatliche Münze Berlin (SMB) is a European coin mint located in the city of Berlin. It is one of the four German coin mints, the others being the Staatliche Münzen Baden-Württemberg, the Bavarian State Mint, and the Hamburgische Münze. The SMB produces a fifth of all German coins.

The first mention of a Berlin mint dates back to a document from 1280. In 1750 and 1764, Frederick II of Prussia enacted coin reforms-supported by mint master Johann Philipp Graumann. Control of the Prussian mint industry was turned over from semi-private enterprises to the crown. During these reforms, the Berlin mint received the "A" mint mark which continues to be used today. The German mint system was established in 1871 with the German Coinage Act. Rather than one common national mint, mints were established in Berlin, Hamburg ("J"), Karlsruhe ("G"), Munich ("D"), and Stuttgart ("F").

In recent history several other mints operated in Germany. These, along with their mint marks, were as follows:

Hannover "B" 1866–1874, Vienna "B" 1938–1944, Frankfurt "C" 1866–1879, Dresden "E" 1872–1887, Muldenhütten (Freiberg area) "E" 1887–1953, Darmstadt "H" 1872–1882, and Tabora (German East Africa) "T", 1916.

== See also ==
- List of euro mints
