= Ole Bjørn Fausa =

Norwegian businessman

Ole Bjørn Fausa (born 22 April 1966) is a Norwegian investor and entrepreneur. He is one of the founders and primary shareholders of the Samlerhuset Group, headquartered in Almere, Netherlands. Fausa is also an investor in the food supplement industry and fish farming. Fausa has previously worked for Deloitte Consulting.

== Childhood and education ==
Ole Bjørn Fausa started collecting postage stamps and related objects as a young boy. In his teens he and a close friend founded Nordfil Nytt, a magazine focusing on stamps and stamp collecting. Soon coins and medals entered the picture and Fausa co-founded the company Samlerhuset Norway in the beginning of the nineties. Fausa has a Master of Business Administration degree from BI Norway Business School.

== Social activities ==
Fausa is known to back the Norwegian football club Follo FK financially. In 2011 Follo FK was on the verge of bankruptcy when Fausa stepped in to save the club. Later in 2011 Fausa was elected Chairman of the Board of Follo FK, where after the football club put focus on developing new talents and hiring experienced football coaches in order to be able to provide those talents with the professional guidance needed. As a chairman Fausa has also stressed the need to run the whole club in a more professional manner.
