= Royal Norwegian Mint =

- Industry: Metalworking
- Founded: 1686; 340 years ago
- Headquarters: Kongsberg, Norway
- Area served: Norway
- Products: coins
- Owner: Samlerhuset; Mint of Finland
- Website: myntverket.no (in Norwegian)

The Royal Norwegian Mint (Norwegian: Den Kongelige Mynt) is a mint in Norway responsible for producing coins of the Norwegian krone. Founded in 1686 as part of Kongsberg Silverworks, the mint was taken over by the Central Bank of Norway in 1962 and later incorporated in 2001 into a private company with the Central Bank of Norway remaining the sole owner and shareholder. The company was renamed "Det Norske Myntverket" (The Norwegian Mint). In 2003 the Central Bank sold its entire holding, 50% to Samlerhuset AS and 50% to the Mint of Finland.
