= Qumran coins =

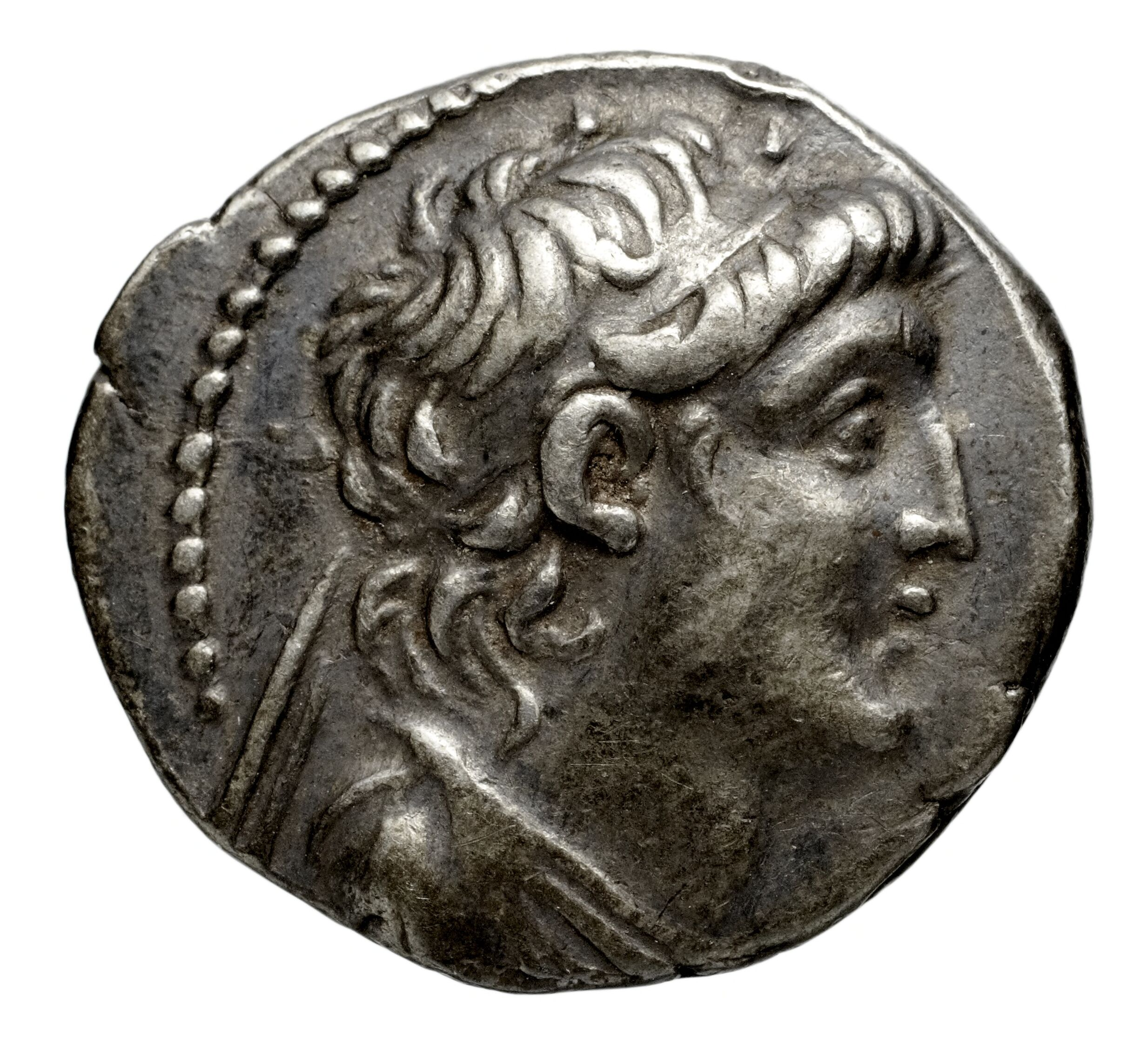
Tyrian silver Didrachm coin of Antiochus VII Sidetes - of the type found in Qumran

The Qumran coins are the coins that had been discovered in the ancient settlement of Qumran, as well as in the caves nearby where the Dead Sea Scrolls have also been found. These coins represent important evidence from the ancient site that can clarify the nature of economic activity of the people living there, as well as the chronology of the site.

== History of research ==
The original excavations of Qumran, conducted by Roland de Vaux between 1951 and 1956, unearthed about 1,250 coins. 690 of these coins were individual finds that were scattered in many parts of the settlement. This figure includes both silver and bronze coins found at the site. This suggests that Qumran was not an isolated settlement of a monastic type, where the inhabitants are completely separated from society.

A tentative list of the Qumran coins along with Roland de Vaux's field diary from the excavations was published in 1994 in French, in German in 1996 and in English in 2003.

Most of the coins discovered around the site by excavators, by far, belonged to the time of Alexander Jannaeus. 143 of his coins were found during the original excavations by de Vaux.

During Jannaeus' long rule, a lot of bronze coins were issued, and they circulated even after his death. He did not mint any silver coins; Tyrian silver coins were used instead during his time.

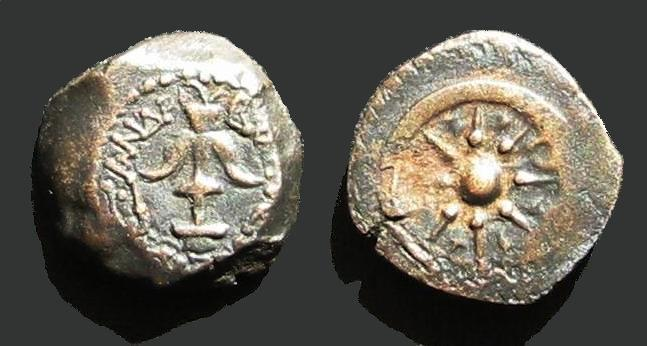
Bronze coin of Alexander Jannaeus (103 to 76 BCE). Obv: Seleucid anchor and Greek Legend: BASILEOS ALEXANDROU "King Alexander". Rev: Eight-spoke wheel or star within diadem. Hebrew legend inside the spokes: "Yehonatan the King".

Another significant discovery in 1955 was a hoard of 561 silver coins contained within three ceramic pots. These pots were found in the same room, known as Locus 120. Most of these coins are known as ‘Tyrian coins’ (Tyrian shekel), because they were minted at the city of Tyre, now in Lebanon.

One of these pots was manufactured at Qumran and was in common use there, which provides a significant link to this community. Since its neck was too narrow, a small hole was made in the belly of the pot so that it could be filled with coins.

But the other two pots are believed to be foreign to the site, and brought from somewhere else. These were small pots with a large spout, and without handles, which were completely filled with coins. The spout was plugged with a stopper made of palm fibre.

Unfortunately, because of various complications, including political, and the question of ownership, as well as the early death of the excavator Roland de Vaux, the exact inventory of these finds was never completely clarified. The coins were split between the museums in Amman, Jordan, and in Israel.

The first lot of these coins was published by Marcia Sharabani in 1980. The last two hoards located in Amman, Jordan, were published by Kenneth Lönnqvist in 2007.

The original excavators of Qumran relied heavily on all these coins for the dating of the various phases of the site. They based their date for the beginning of the settlement on the significant number of Seleucid coins found there. Thus, they fixed this date at the end of the second century BC.

The excavators believed that there was a catastrophic earthquake in the region in 31 BC, that led to the temporary abandonment of the site. So they believed that a relatively small number of coins from the reign of Herod (37-4 BC) at the site supported this view.

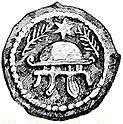
Bronze coin of Herod the Great, bearing a legionary helmet on the obverse. Herod did not mint any silver coins

Subsequently, both of these assumptions were challenged in later research. The number of Herod's coins wasn't so small, to begin with, and most scholars now doubt that the earthquake significantly disrupted the site in 31 BC.

=== Events after the death of Herod ===
On the other hand, debates still continue about the period that followed the death of Herod in 4 BC. This was the period of considerable political turbulence in Israel because of a power vacuum that was created. At that time, Roman general Quinctilius Varus suppressed the Jewish revolt in Judaea (4 BC).

De Vaux considered that the settlement became rejuvenated during the rule of Herod Archelaus (4 BC-6 AD), based, in part, on his understanding of the chronology of the big silver hoard that he found. The last coins in the hoard are dated to 9/8 BC. Because he was sure of the abandonment of the site after 32 BC earthquake, he interpreted these silver coins as signifying the beginning of his Level II.

Some scholars believe that the Period Ib at Qumran ended only around that time of the War of Varus, and that these events also signified the end of the Essene occupation of the site, as well as the final deposition of the scrolls.

The exact chronology of Qumran during this period still remains heavily disputed, and the debates about the time of the deposition of the big silver hoard of Qumran still continue.

=== Destruction after 70 AD ===
Almost all scholars agree that Qumran was destroyed in the course of the First Jewish–Roman War (66–73 AD).

The bronze coins identified from Qumran, some dating to the second and third years of the Jewish War, indicate that the site was still actively in use in 68 CE and only destroyed after 70, perhaps as late as 73. The coins from Qumran of this period end with a peculiar series of bronze coins minted in 72/73 at Ascalon, which sent auxiliary troops to assist the Roman army in the First Jewish–Roman War.

Two small coin hoards were found at Qumran dating to this period (Terminal Years 68-69 AD) among 6 other hoards.

In 73 the Romans stormed the mountain fortress of Masada, which also was located on the western bank of the Dead Sea. It is more than likely that Qumran was destroyed this same time, as the coin finds from Qumran end with the same peculiar bronze coins minted at Ascalon.

== Lönnqvist analysis of 2007 ==
The publication of the bulk of the silver coins by K. A. K. Lönnqvist, and his regional analysis, resulted, in 2007, in a new interpretations as to the importance, chronology and significance of the coins.

According to Lönnqvist, the newly dated coins in the silver coin hoards give an earliest possible burial date for the coin hoards to 52/3–66 CE, based on an interpretation of a countermark. However, the archaeological and numismatic nature of the silver coin hoard burials may suggest that the coin hoards may have been buried in the early 3rd century. The final coin was minted in Rome between 206 and 210, during the reign of the emperor Caracalla.

Nevertheless, Lönnqvist's theories have been criticized by Farhi and Price. They point to the fact that the identity of the silver coins from Qumran held at the Amman Museum in Jordan is not certain.

== Further excavations ==
Y. Magen and Y. Peleg team conducted further excavations at Qumran in 1993–2009, and they found a lot more coins. 259 coins were found, 71 of which were unidentifiable.

According to Donald Ariel, only 4 silver coins were found; the rest of them were bronze. Ariel also tries to clarify what happened to the coins excavated previously, and provides some further insights as to how the new evidence may clarify some difficulties about Qumran's chronology.

Bruno Callegher (2023) provides a detailed overview of all the recent research on Qumran coins, and the updated inventory of the coins found up to date. In particular, his analysis focuses on the significant presence of the Seleucid coins at the site, which may indicate that the Qumran settlement was founded a lot earlier than some other scholars think. So de Vaux may have been right after all that the site goes back to mid-2nd century BC. The entire Seleucid series: tetradrachm/didrachm/drachm is present at the site, as well as their small bronze coin.

== See also ==
- Shekel
- Jerusalem shekel
- Bar Kochba shekel
- Copper Scroll

== Bibliography ==
- Ariel D.T. 2002a. “The Coins from the Surveys and Excavations of Caves in the Northern Judean Desert,” ʿAtiqot 41/2: 281–304
- Ariel D.T. and Fontanille J.-P. 2012. The Coins of Herod: A Modern Analysis and Die Classification (Ancient Judaism and Early Christianity 79), Leiden-Boston.
- Ariel D.T., 2018, Coins from the Renewed Excavations at Qumran. In Y. Magen and Y. Peleg. Back to Qumran. Final Report (1993–2004) (Judea and Samaria Publications 18). Jerusalem: Israel Antiquities Authority. Pp. 403–429
- Callegher B. 2017. The Coins of Khirbet Qumran from the Digs of Roland De Vaux: Returning to Henri Seyrig and Augustus Spijkerman. In M. Fidanzio ed. The Caves of Qumran: Proceedings of the International Conference. Lugano 2014 (Studies on the Texts of the Desert of Judah 118), Leiden, pp. 221–237.
- Bruno Callegher 2023, Following the Coins from the Excavations at Khirbet Qumran (1951–1956) and Aïn Feshkha (1956–1958). Novum Testamentum et Orbis Antiquus, Series Archaeologica (NTOA.SA) Band 10
- Donceel R. and Donceel-Voûte P. 1994. The Archaeology of Khirbet Qumran. In M.O. Wise, N. Golb, J.J. Collins and D.G. Pardee (eds.), Methods of Investigation of the Dead Sea Scrolls and the Khirbet Qumran Site. Present Realities and Future Prospects. Annals of the New York Academy of Sciences, 722, New York, pp. 1–38.
- Farhi Y. and Price R. 2010. The Numismatic Finds from the Qumran Plateau: Excavations 2004–2006, and 2008 Seasons. Dead Sea Discoveries 17: 210–225.
- Meshorer Y. 2003–2006. The Coins from Qumran. Israel Numismatic Journal 15: 19–23.
- Murphy C.M. 2002. Wealth in the Dead Sea Scrolls and in the Qumran Community, Leiden, Boston and Köln.
