= Israel Coins and Medals Corp. =

Israel Coins and Medals Corp. is the body permitted by the Government of Israel to issue the official State Medals of Israel and under an exclusive contract with the Bank of Israel, the corporation is the exclusive worldwide distributor of the commemorative coins and special banknote issues of the Bank of Israel. From its inception in 1958 until 2008, the corporation was fully owned by the Government. In 2008, it was privatized. The corporation has its own manufacturing plant, where commemorative coins for the Bank of Israel, Israel State medals and privately ordered medals are minted.

== History ==
Israel Coins and Medals Corp. was established in 1958 by the first Prime Minister of Israel, David Ben Gurion, and was to be an Ambassador to the Jewish people and the world, through distribution of the Commemorative Coins issued by the Bank of Israel and the Official State Medals. Since its establishment, the Israel Coins and Medals Corp. has maintained its original character and values, as Ben Gurion had envisioned.

In 2008, the corporation was privatized, according to a decision made by the Israeli Government, and purchased by G.R.A.S Design Combinations Ltd., following a stringent selection process.

== Corporation's Aims ==
The aims of the Corporation are to commemorate historical and national events, scientific accomplishments and achievements of Israel, perpetuate the memory of its outstanding leaders and personalities, highlight its historical sites, preserve its culture and art and give artistic expression to the joyful occasions in Israeli society and lives of the individuals.

=== Roles ===
- Distribution of the Collector Coins issued by the Bank of Israel
- Issuance of the official State Medals of Israel and special medals for organizations, enterprises and individuals
- Issuance of one-gram to one-kilogram Gold and Silver Bars, for investment and gifts
- Design and production of "Adillion" Coin-Jewelry, mounted with coins and medals
- Production of recreations of ancient coins discovered in archaeological excavations in Israel and sale of authentic ancient coins, licensed by the Israel Antiquities Authority
- Design, production and marketing of authentic Israeli art works

=== Exclusive Distributor of the Commemorative Coins issued by the Bank of Israel ===
The Bank of Israel, which is the Central Bank of the State of Israel, solely, has the right by law to issue the currency of Israel - banknotes, coins, commemorative and special coins. The Governor of the Bank of Israel determines the form of banknotes and coins with the approval of the Administrative Council and the Government. For this purpose, the Governor consults with the Public Committee for the Planning of Banknotes and Coins.

=== Commemorative Coins and Series ===
The Bank of Israel usually issues five new Commemorative Coins in limited mintages, annually. Four of the coins are issued within series

- Biblical Art
- UNESCO World Heritage Sites in Israel
- Views of Israel
- Jerusalem of Gold (Israeli Gold Bullion Coins)

A special Commemorative Coin is issued each year in honor of Israel's Independence Day and is dedicated to one of the outstanding achievements of the State of Israel.

== Bank of Israel Gold and Silver Commemorative Coins ==
The commemorative coins issued by the Bank of Israel are struck in gold and silver. The 1 New Shekel and 2 New Shekel Coins are struck in silver, while the 5, 10 and 20 New Shekels (and small size 1 New Shekel) are struck in gold.

In 2010, the Bank of Israel issued the first Israeli Bullion Coin in a Series entitled "Jerusalem of Gold". The coins in this series picture famous sites in Jerusalem. Their mintages are limited to 3,600 and they are struck in fine gold.9999 with a diameter of 32mm. They weigh 1 Troy Oz. (31.1 grams) and bear a 20 New Shekels face value. The price of these coins changes daily in accordance with the international gold spot price.

== State Medals of Israel ==
Israel State Medals are miniature works of art that commemorate the history of the Israeli nation and the historical events in Israel and the world, in which Israel takes part. They bear the Israel State Emblem with authorization from the Committee on Ceremonies and Symbols.

The first Israel State Medal, "Liberation", was issued in 1958, the tenth anniversary year of Israel. One side of the medal bears the design of the "Judaea Capta" Roman coins that were issued following the destruction of the Second Temple and victory of Rome, while the other side depicts a happy mother lifting her baby and an agriculturist planting a tree in the young State of Israel, symbolic of the rebirth of the Jewish people in the Land of Israel.

Over the years, many medals commemorating the history of the State of Israel have been issued.

Famous leaders and personalities in the history of Israel and the Jewish people are featured on medals – Prime Ministers and Presidents, Chiefs of Staff of the Israel Defense Forces who have died and Jewish Contributors to World Culture. A "Jewish Sages" Medal Series presents important Rabbis who have been influential spiritual leaders in Jewish history and a "Jewish Folktales" Series features the well-known Jewish legends. Other medal series focus on the fighting units of the Israel Defense Forces, as well as the airplanes, tanks and ships that have played a part in the annals of the State of Israel.

Examples of innovative medallic art works produced in more recent years include sculpted art medals based on biblical themes, colorful art medals depicting ancient mosaics discovered in the Holy Land and medals with inset lithographs of famous paintings.

== One-Gram to One-Kilogram Gold and Silver Bars ==
In 2012, for the first time, Israel Coins and Medals Corp. issued gold and silver bars with Dove of Peace and Jerusalem designs, for investment and gifts. The bars range in weight from 1 gram to 1 kilogram, are struck in gold/999.9 and silver/999, serially numbered and come in special secure tamper-proof packagings. The Bar reverse bears the Holy Land Mint logo (the international trade mark of the corporation), the precious metal fineness, weight and serial number. The gold bars are struck in 1 gram, 2.5 gram, 5 gram, 10 gram, Half Ounce., One Ounce. and One Kilogram weights.

== Collaboration ==
Israel Coins and Medals Corp. is authorized to deal in authentic ancient coins. In special collaboration with the Israel Antiquities Authority, the corporation has produced replicas of ancient coins, such as coins found in Qumran and Masada. According to the law of the United States of America, each replica bears the word "COPY" in order to prevent confusion.

== Among Israel's Coin and Medal Issues ==
Coins	Coin Sets	State Medals	Official Award Medals	Greeting Tokens
Independence Day Coin 1958 "Menorah"	Official Piefort Mint Set 1971 – First Piefort Mint Set	"Liberation" First Israel State Medal 1958	50th Anniversary Stockade and Tower Settlements 1986	1 Agora 5724/1964 Design
Independence Day Coin 1959 "Ingathering of the Exiles	Uncirculated Israel Coin Set 1982	20th Anniversary of the Warsaw Ghetto Uprising – State Medal 1963	Israel State Lottery 1970	Israel 28 Years - Numerical Value of the Hebrew word "Strength"
Special Coin Issue 1964 "Bank of Israel 10th Anniversary"	Uncirculated Israel Coin Set 1985	Beit Hatfutzoth (Museum of the Jewish Diaspora) – State Medal 1978	Canada Park 1976	
Special Coin Issue 1974 "David Ben Gurion"		Am Israel Chai (Israel Lives On) – State Medal 1982		
Independence Day Coin 1984 "Brotherhood"				

== International Prizes ==
- "Promised Land", Israel Independence Day Coin 1989, designed by Ruben Nutels, won the title "Best Artistic Coin of the Year" (Coin of the Year Contest 1991)
- "Moses and the Tablets of the Law", tenth Coin in the "Biblical Art" Series (2005), designed by Gideon Keich, won the title "Most Inspirational Coin of the Year" (Coin of the Year Contest 2007)
- "Tel Aviv, the White City", first coin in the "World Heritage Sites in Israel" Series (2006), for its impressive architectural design by Meir Eshel, won second place in the Palladio International Coin Contest held in Vicenza, Italy, in 2007
- "Wolf with the Lamb", twelfth coin in the "Biblical Art" Series (2007), designed by Aharon Shevo, won second place in the International Coin Contest held in Vicenza, Italy, in 2008
- "Israel 60th Anniversary", Israel Independence Day Coin 2008, designed by Ruben Nutels, won the title "Best Artistic Coin of the Year" (Coin of the Year Contest 2010)
- "Jonah in the Whale", fifteenth Coin in the "Biblical Art" Series (2010), designed by Gideon Keich and Aharon Shevo, won the title "Best Coin of the Year" (Coin of the Year Contest 2012)
- "Akko", third in the "World Heritage Sites" Series (2010), designed by Moshe Pereg, won second place for its architectural design, in the Palladio International Coin Contest held in Vicenza, Italy, in 2010
- "Gymnastics" Coin (2011), designed by David Harel, won first place in the International Coin Contest held in Vicenza, Italy, in 2012
- "Tel Megiddo", fourth in the "World Heritage Sites" Series (2012), designed by Osnat Eshel, was given special mention for its architectural design, in the Palladio International Coin Contest held in Vicenza, Italy, in 2013
