= Mint of Finland =

National mint of Finland

Suomen Rahapaja Oy

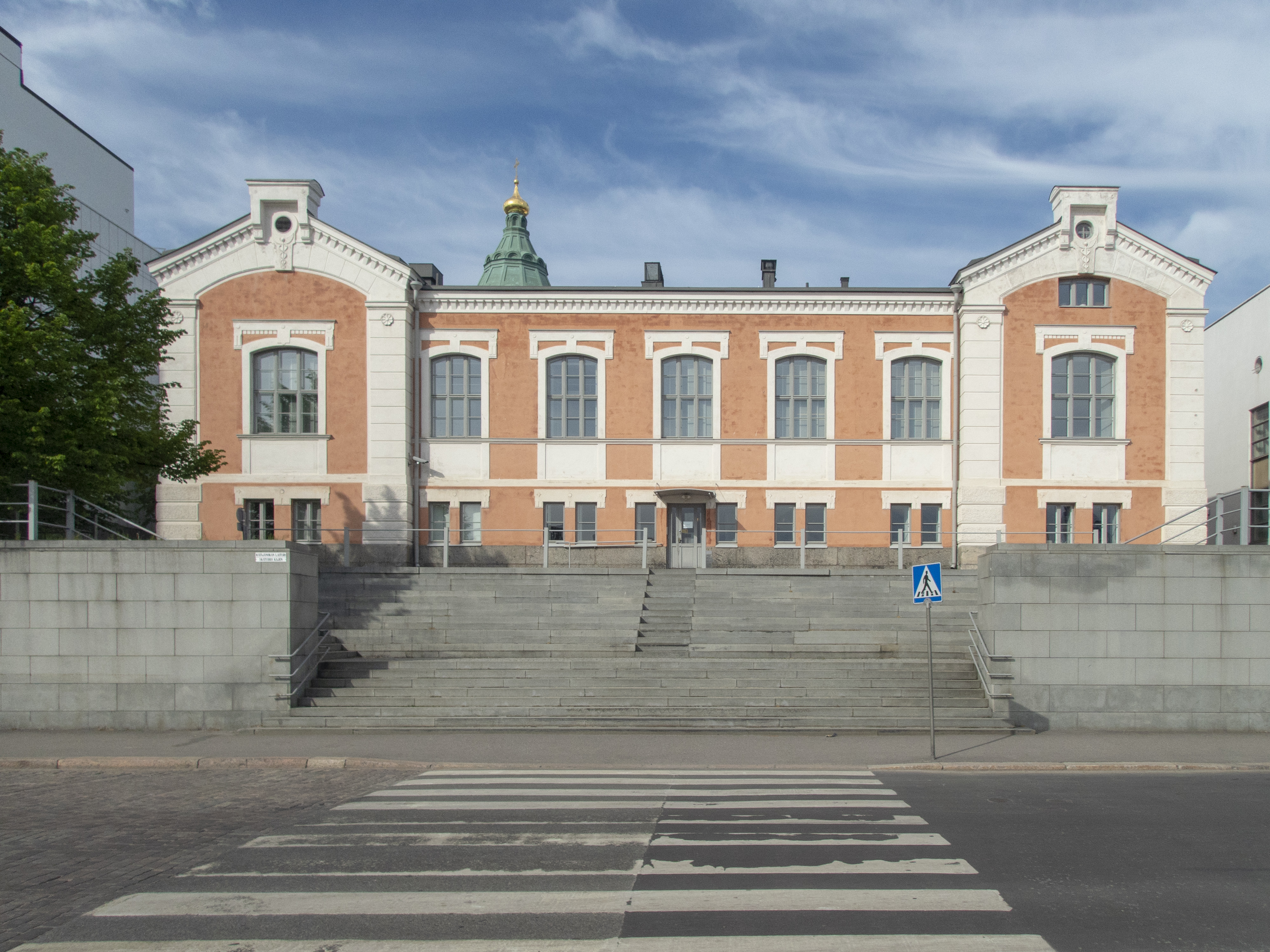
- Industry: Metalworking
- Founded: 1860; 166 years ago
- Headquarters: Helsinki, Finland
- Area served: Finland
- Products: coins
- Website: www.rahapaja.fi

The Mint of Finland (Finnish: Suomen Rahapaja, Swedish: Myntverket i Finland), legally registered as Suomen Rahapaja Oy (Myntverket i Finland Ab in Swedish), is the national mint of Finland. It was established by Alexander II of Russia in 1860. The mint was earlier located in the Katajanokka district of Helsinki and the production facility later moved to Vantaa.

== History ==
The Mint of Finland was established by Alexander II of Russia in 1860 in the Katajanokka district of Helsinki. The first coins were designed by Alexander Fadejev and the mint dyes were made by Swedish engraver Lea Ahlborn in 1863. The mint began releasing coins from 1864. The production facility later moved to Vantaa, and the Mint of Finland became a public limited company in 1993. In 2001, it bought the ownership of the Swedish mint Myntverket, and in 2003, bought half of the shares of the Royal Norwegian Mint. In 2011, it acquired note manufacturer Saxonia.

== Issues ==
Apart from producing Finnish marks since its inception, the mint has been producing euros since 1998. It has also been contracted to produce mints for other countries. The Mint of Finland has produced the euro coins of other European countries like Estonia, Greece, Luxembourg, Slovenia, Cyprus, and Republic of Ireland. It has produced coins for the Swedish crown since 2008. Since 2017, it has held the contract for minting coins of the Danish krone.

In 2023, the Mint of Finland signed additional contracts with the Banco de Guatemala for the supply of 400 million coins of one Guatemalan quetzal. It was contracted by the Banco de la República in Colombia for the supply of 370 million Colombian Peso coins. It also minted coins for Mozambique from 2017 to 2021.

== Closure ==
On the 28 August 2024, the directors of the mint announced plans to terminate operations of the mint. The mint was expected to close in late 2025 once the current contracts are honoured. The reason for closure has been given as dwindling usage of coins, and decrease in profitability. The closure is expected to result in losses of hundreds of jobs. In December 2024, it was announced that the contracts for minting Finnish coins would be awarded to the Royal Dutch Mint, and that the coins would be minted under the flag of Helsinki Mint.

== See also ==
- List of euro mints
