= Hungarian Mint =

Government-owned mint which produces Hungarian forint coins

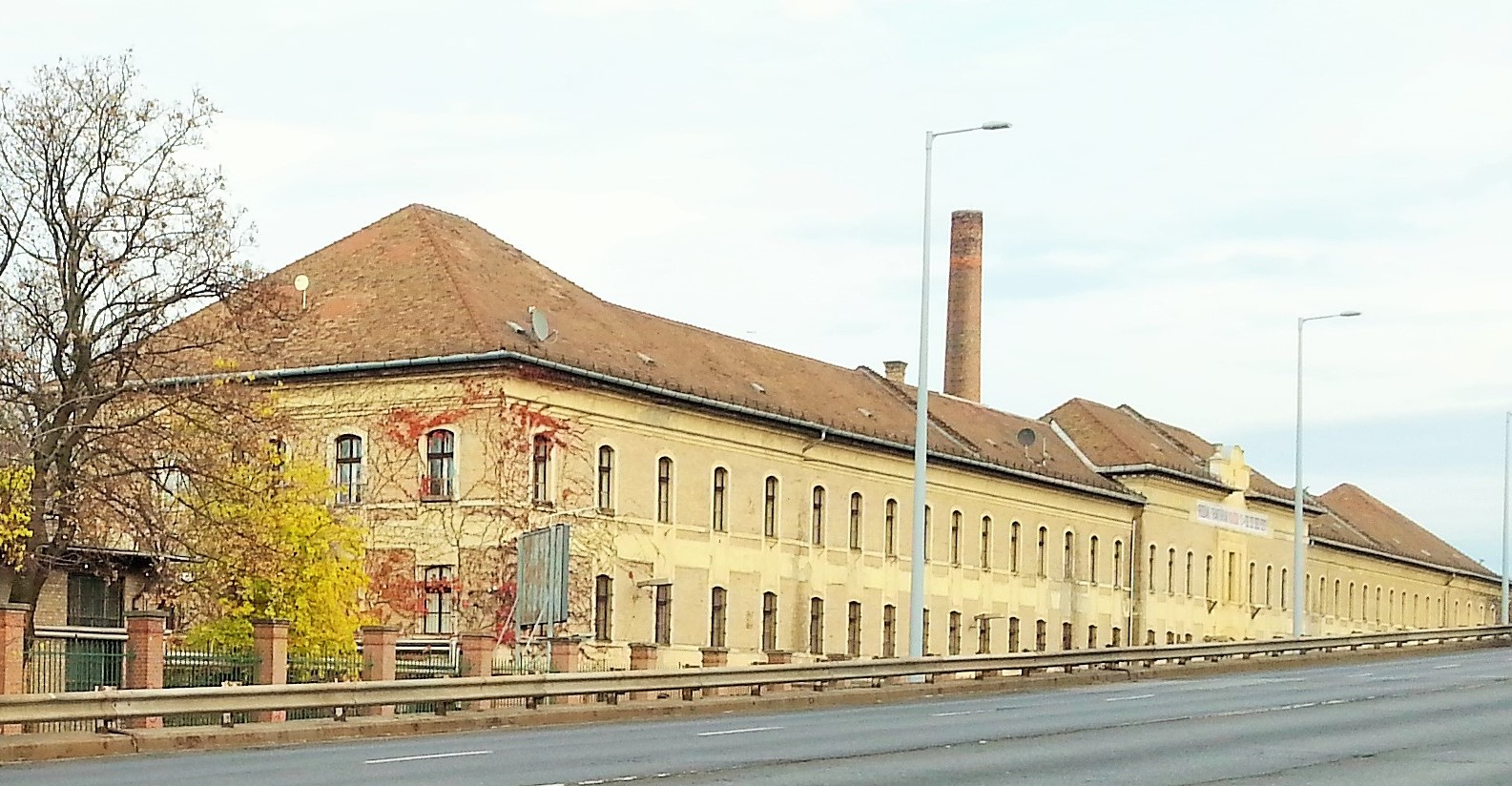
- The Hungarian Mint building in Budapest
- Company type: Government-owned company
- Industry: Coin and medal production
- Founded: 1001; 1925 as the Royal Hungarian State Mint
- Headquarters: Budapest, Hungary
- Area served: Hungary
- Products: Coins; Medals
- Owner: Hungarian National Bank
- Website: www.penzvero.hu

The Hungarian Mint (Hungarian: Magyar Pénzverő) is a government owned mint that produces circulating coins for Hungary. As a private company the mint is wholly owned by the Hungarian National Bank and is the sole body responsible for minting coins of the Hungarian forint. As well as minting circulating coins for use domestic the mint also produces a range of commemorative coins and manufacturers medals.

== History ==
The origin of the mint can be traced back to the foundation of the Kingdom of Hungary when under King Stephen I silver denar were minted bearing his name. The denar remained the leading denomination in the country for the next three centuries, alongside the Obolus.

== Bibliography ==
- Bartlett, Robert (2003). The Making of Europe: Conquest, Colonization and Cultural Change 950 - 1350. Penguin. ISBN 978-0140154092.
