= Staatliche Münzen Baden-Württemberg =

Coordinates: 48.8020°N 9.2319°E

The Logo of the SMBW is the coat of arms for the Baden-Württemberg

The Staatliche Münzen Baden-Württemberg (SMBW) is a coin mint in Germany, producing coins of the euro currency.

It was established in 1998 as the result of a merger between the Karlsruhe and Stuttgart mints. Nonwithstanding the merger, the two formerly separate mints have retained their respective mint marks: 'F' for Stuttgart and 'G' for Karlsruhe.

The SMBW has been chosen by the Latvian government to mint its euro coins, since Latvia joined the eurozone on 1 January 2014.

== See also ==
- Latvia and the euro
- Staatliche Münze Berlin
- Hamburgische Münze
- Bavarian Central Mint
- Euro
- Coin mint
