= Bavarian State Mint =

European mint in the city of Munich, Germany

Coordinates: 48.1387°N 11.6437°E

The Bavarian State Mint (German: Bayerisches Hauptmünzamt) is a European mint located in the city of Munich.

It is one of the four German coin mints, the others being the Staatliche Münzen Baden-Württemberg, the Staatliche Münze Berlin, and the Hamburgische Münze. The Bavarian State Mint has been in operation since 1871 CE. All coins from the BCM contain a 'D' mint mark for tracking purposes.

== See also ==
- Staatliche Münze Berlin
- Staatliche Münzen Baden-Württemberg
- Hamburgische Münze
- Euro
- Bavaria (Freistaat Bayern)
