= German Coinage Act =

- Territorial extent: German Empire
- Enacted: 9 July 1873 (Reichsgesetzblatt, p. 233)
- Commenced: 29 July 1873
- Repealed: 20 June 1948 (§§ 1, 2, 26 G, 20 June 1948, WiGBl. Suppmt. No. 5, p. 1)

Summary
- Last revision 30 August 1924 (RGBl. II p. 254), in force 11 October 1924. Last amendment: Art. 1 Amendment Act on 5 Jul 1934 (RGBl. I p. 574), in force 7 July 1934 (Art. 3, para. 2 G, 24 March 1933, RGBl. I p .141)

On the founding of the German Empire in 1871, trade and transport was hampered by the existence of eight different currency systems across the various member states of the Empire. There were eight state currencies whose coins included the Thaler, Vereinsthaler, Konventionsthaler, Kreuzer, Heller, Groschen, Silbergroschen, Neugroschen, Gulden, Konventionsgulden, Schilling, Mark, Pfennig, Neu-Pfennig, Franc, Centime, Bremen Goldthaler, Groten, Schwaren, Prussian or Graumann Reichsthaler, Kurantthaler and Friedrich d'Or, which were all based on different gold and silver standards, making trade more difficult.

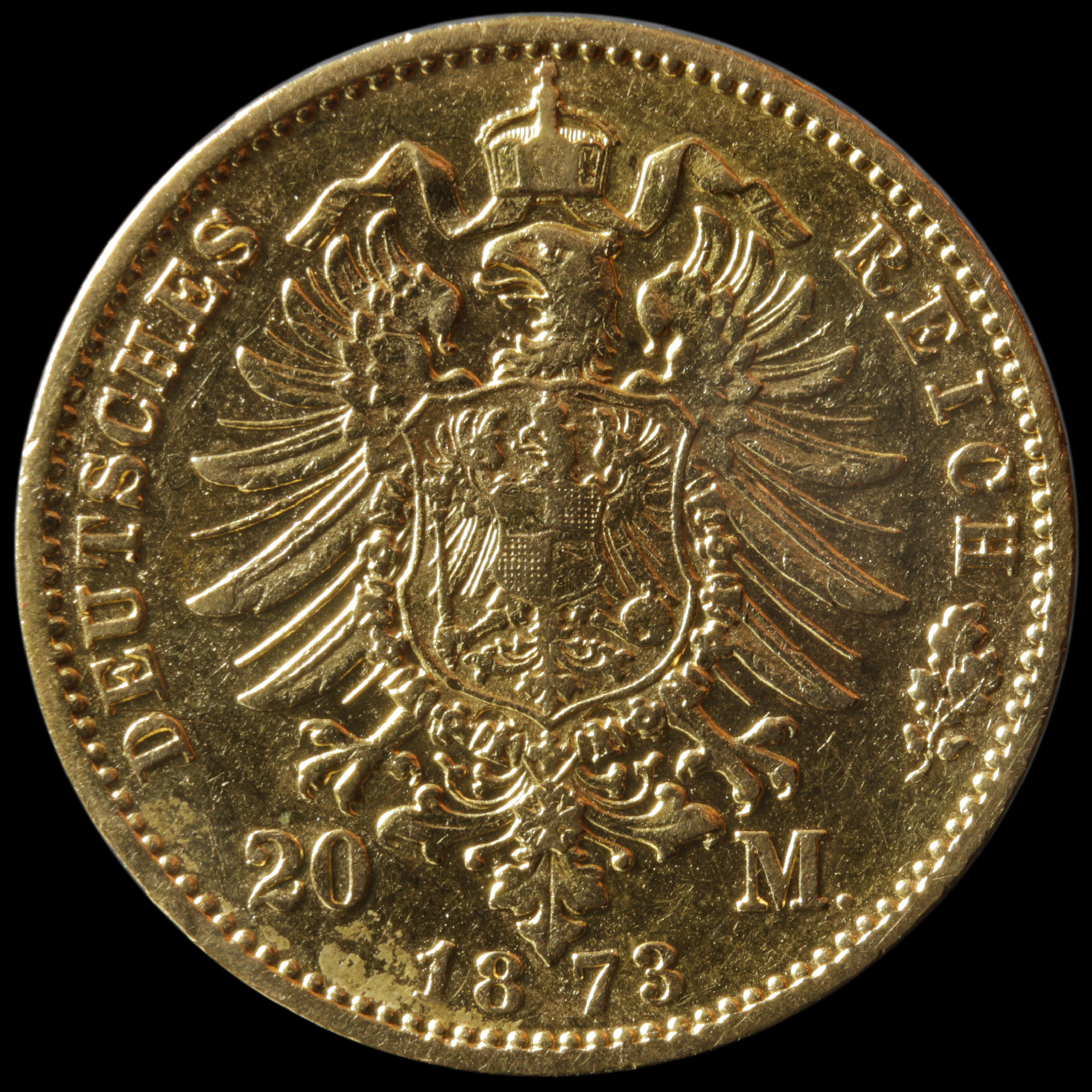
20 Mark gold Reich coin …

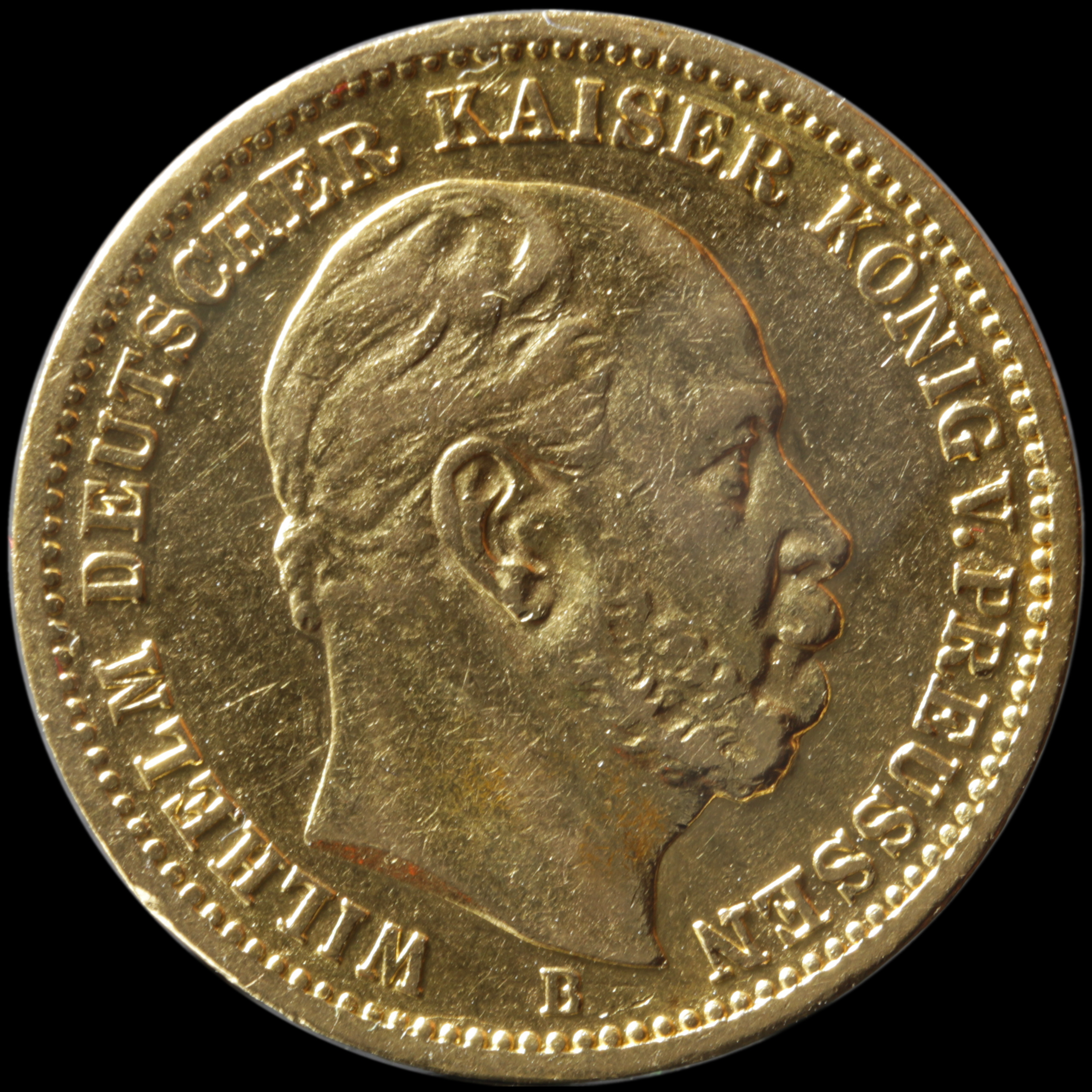
… of Emperor William I

As a result, Kaiser William I passed the first act of currency union in the German Empire. The Coinage Act of 4 December 1871 specified the gold content of the new common currency, the imperial gold coin, which was to be used by all state monetary systems from 9 July 1873. The Mark was introduced throughout the Empire on 1 January 1876.

The act was amended on June 1, 1900. It was amended again on June 1, 1909, but on the outbreak of the First World War, the currency's linkage to the gold standard was suspended and it was finally abolished at the end of the war in 1918. The initially gold-backed Mark degenerated into a worthless paper Mark (Papiermark) by 15 November 1923 due to the unaffordable reparation payments demanded of the Weimar Republic by the Allies which caused hyperinflation.

With the currency reform of 1923, a new currency, the Rentenmark, was created which was based on material assets that had been measured in gold marks (corresponding to 1/2790 kg of gold) according to Section 6. On 30 August 1924, the Reich government decided to liquidate the Rentenbank in favour of a new Reichsbank, the new currency, the Reichsmark, was to have gold backing again (Coin Act 1924). In fact, gold coins denominated in Reichsmarks were never minted and Rentenmark banknotes were never withdrawn from general payment transactions during the Third Reich. Instead, in 1938, all imperial gold coins were declared invalid and confiscated.

The coinage law of 1924 only became formally invalid when the Currency Act of 20 June 1948 (Gesetzblatt der Verwaltungs des Vereinigte Wirtschaftsgebiets or WiGBl. Supplement No. 5, p. 1) in the three western occupation zones completed the currency reform to the Deutsche Mark.
