= Royal Dutch Mint =

National coin mint of the Kingdom of the Netherlands

Koninklijke Nederlandse Munt

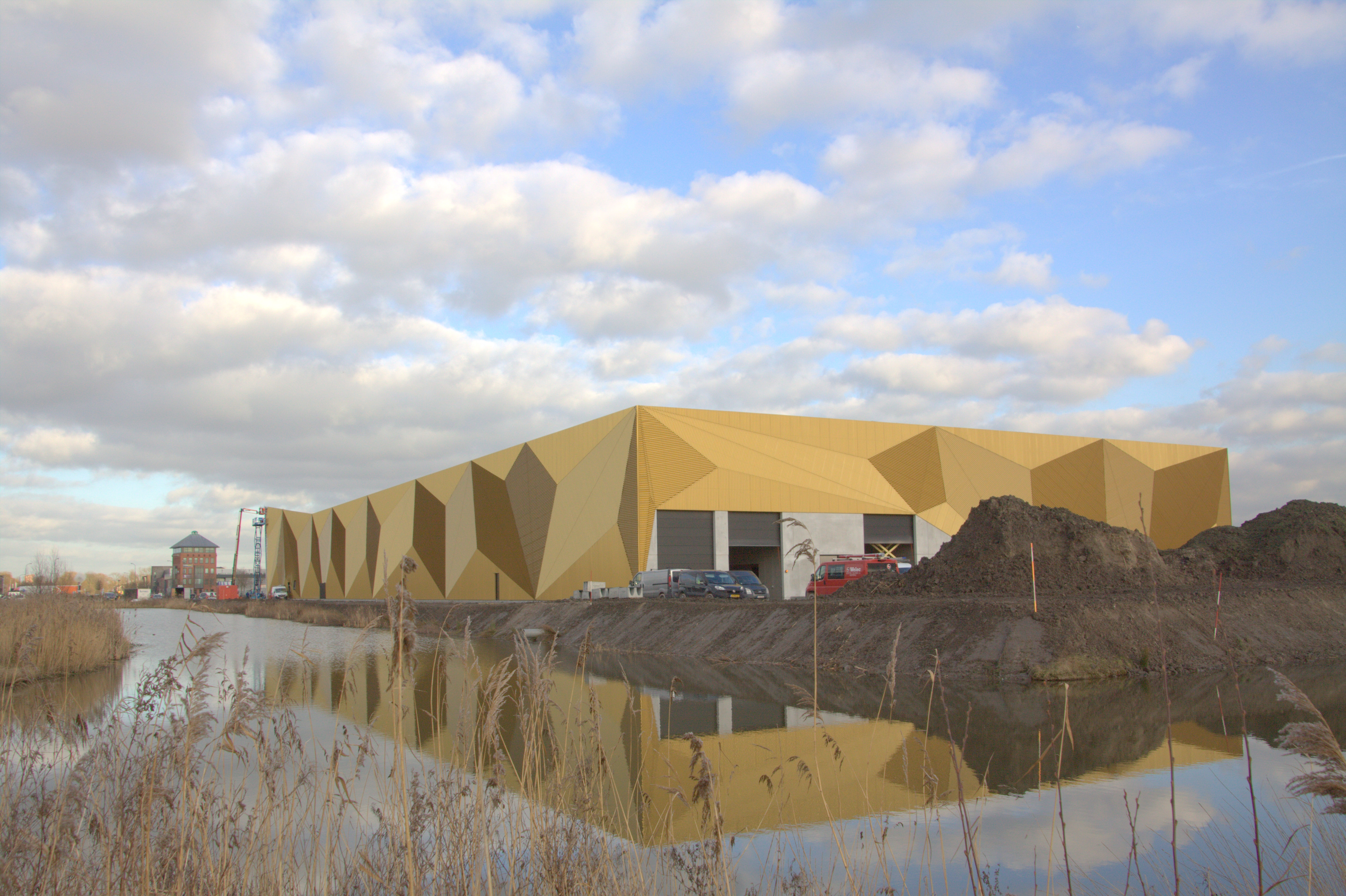
- The Dutch Vault.
- Native name: Koninklijke Nederlandse Munt
- Company type: Naamloze vennootschap
- Industry: coin production
- Founded: 1567, Utrecht
- Founder: Dutch Government
- Headquarters: Houten, Netherlands
- Area served: Worldwide
- Key people: Susan van Wijk (Director) Bert van Ravenswaaij (Muntmeester)
- Products: coins / medals
- Number of employees: 90
- Website: www.royaldutchmint.com

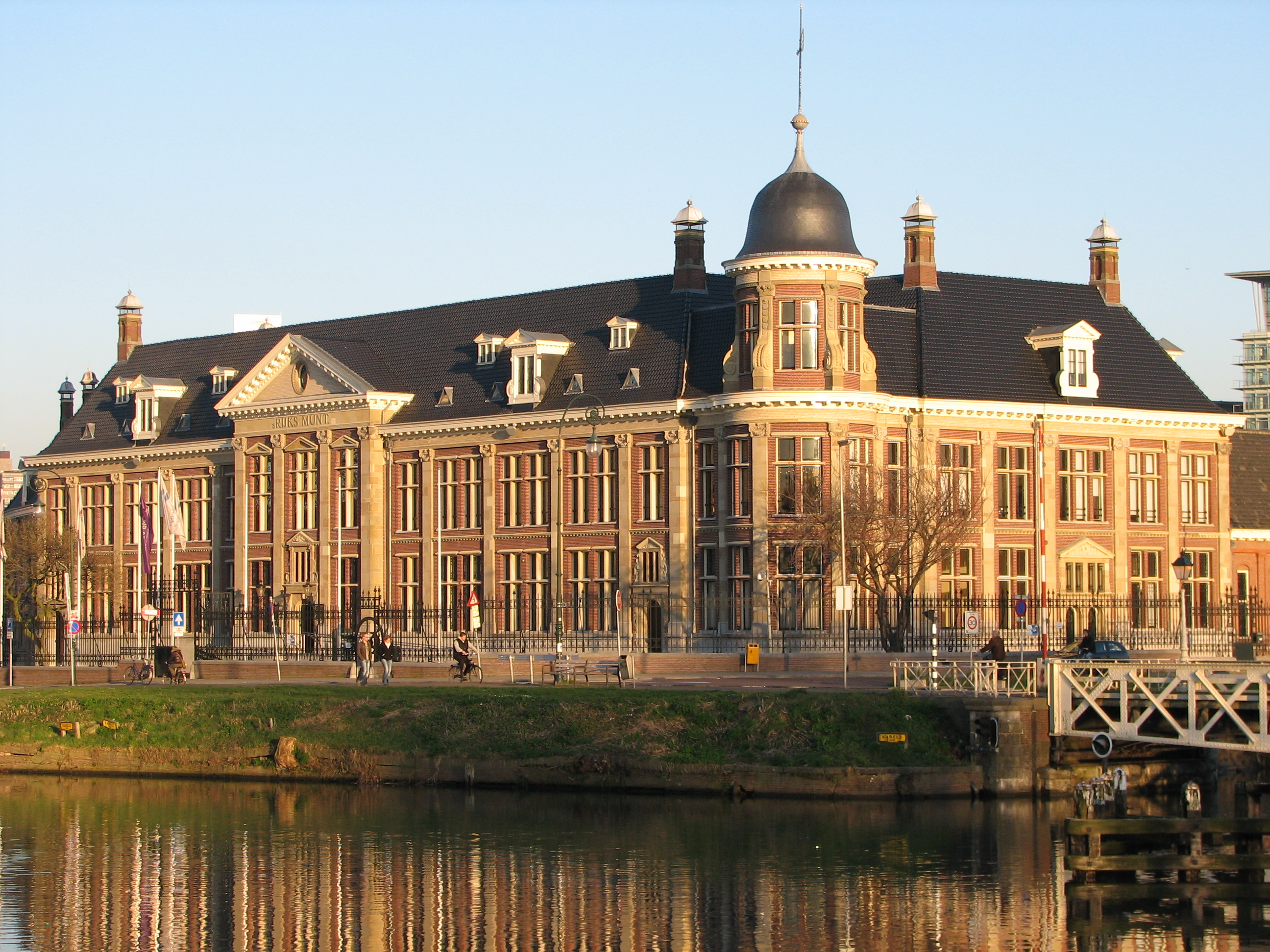
Former building of the KNM, built between 1903 and 1911, called De Munt.

The Royal Dutch Mint (Koninklijke Nederlandse Munt, abbreviated KNM) is a company founded in 1567 that is responsible for producing, among others, euro coins for the Kingdom of the Netherlands. It is currently located in Houten, Netherlands, where it moved to in 2020. It was established and previously owned by the Dutch State, but is now owned by HM Precious Metals.

== History ==
On 17 September 1806, when the Netherlands was under the rule of King Louis Bonaparte, he decided that the striking and distribution of coins should be by a single, national body. This was in contrast to the Middle Ages custom of large trading cities having their own mint and coins, which resulted in several coins circulating within the country, and many levels of controlling bureaucracy.

Originally, it was planned for the mint's seat to be located in the capital city of Amsterdam. Since there was insufficient funding, the national mint's seat was located in Utrecht.

After Napoleon was defeated in 1814, the Kingdom of the Netherlands was founded, and William I became king of the Netherlands. The mint was renamed to 's Rijks Munt. What is now Belgium was a part of the new kingdom, and a second Mint was located in Brussels. When Belgium gained independence in 1839, 's Rijks Munt became the only mint in the Kingdom of the Netherlands. The provincial coins that had been minted before the unification of the Mint were still in circulation. Due to their relatively high intrinsic value, the "new" coins would gain popularity over time. In 1849 the provincial coins were officially taken out of circulation.

In 1901 the company was placed under the supervision of the Ministry of Finance, and in 1912 the mint officially became state-owned. In 1944, nearing the end of the German occupation during the Second World War, coins were produced in the United States. This was necessary to ensure that there would be enough currency available after liberation.

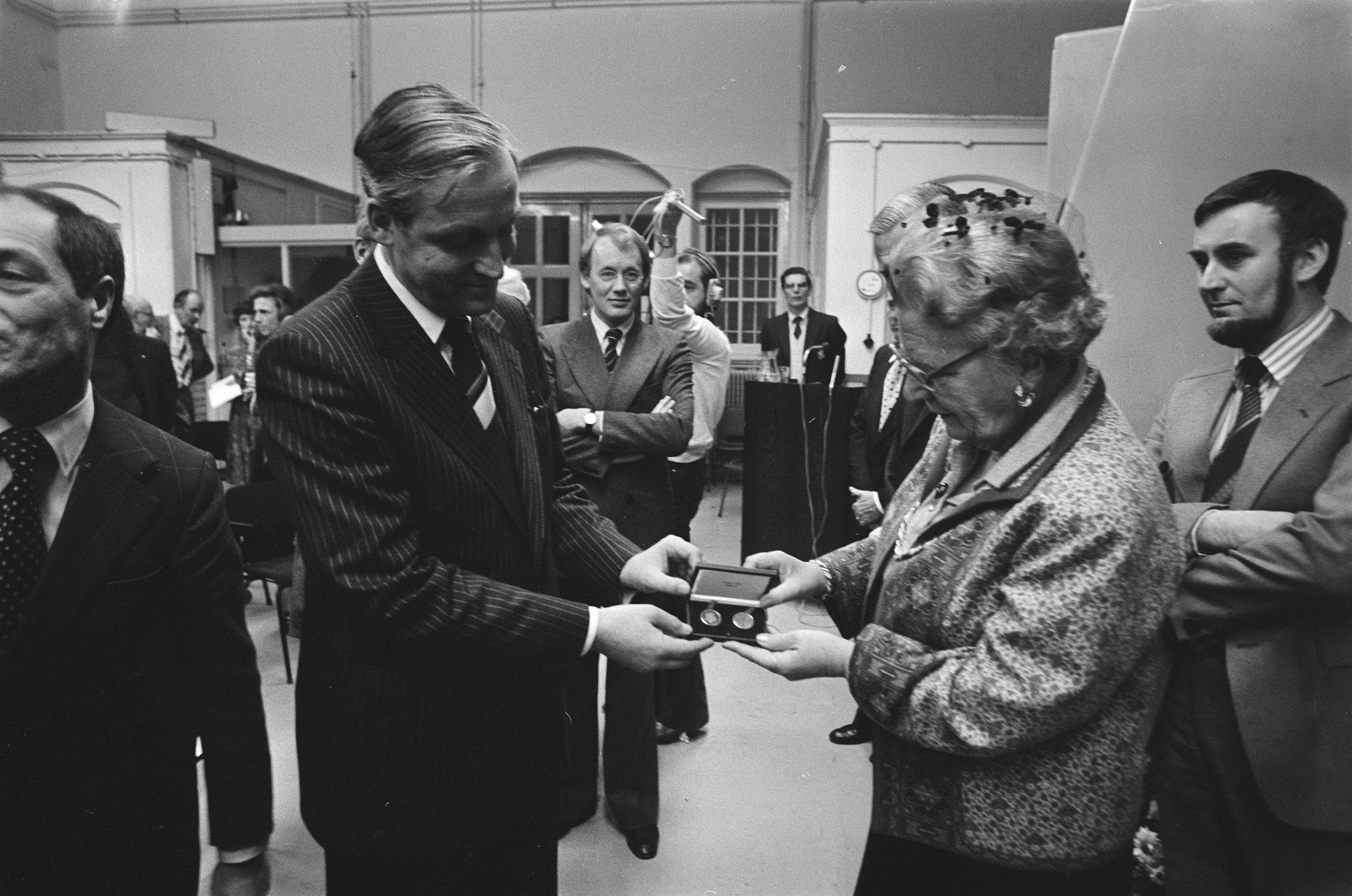
Queen Juliana receives coins during a visit on 17 November 1978.

In 1994 's Rijks Munt was renamed to De Nederlandse Munt. It became a company, 100% of whose shares were owned by the Dutch State. The Queen awarded the company the prefix Koninklijk (Royal) five years later, and the company was now allowed to call itself the Koninklijke Nederlandse Munt (Royal Dutch Mint). On 22 November 2016 the Royal Dutch Mint was sold to Heylen Groep, and later to HM Precious Metals.

On 1 April 2020 the Royal Dutch Mint moved to their current location in Houten, closing their historic location in Utrecht. The new building has greater production capacity and is more secure. The building is based on the pattern of the geometric portrait of king Willem-Alexander, which is pictured on the euro.

== Production ==
Since 2002, the Royal Dutch Mint has been allowed to strike coins for foreign national banks in the euro zone, and occasionally strikes coins for other countries such as Guatemala and Honduras. Furthermore, the Royal Dutch Mint produces commemorative coins, collectible coins, medals and royal decorations.

The Royal Dutch Mint was also delegated the task of destroying the old guilders after their replacement by the euro in 2002.

== See also ==
- De Nederlandsche Bank
- Dutch euro coins
- Dutch guilder
- European Central Bank
- List of mints
