= National Purple Heart Hall of Honor commemorative coins =

US commemorative coins issued in 2022

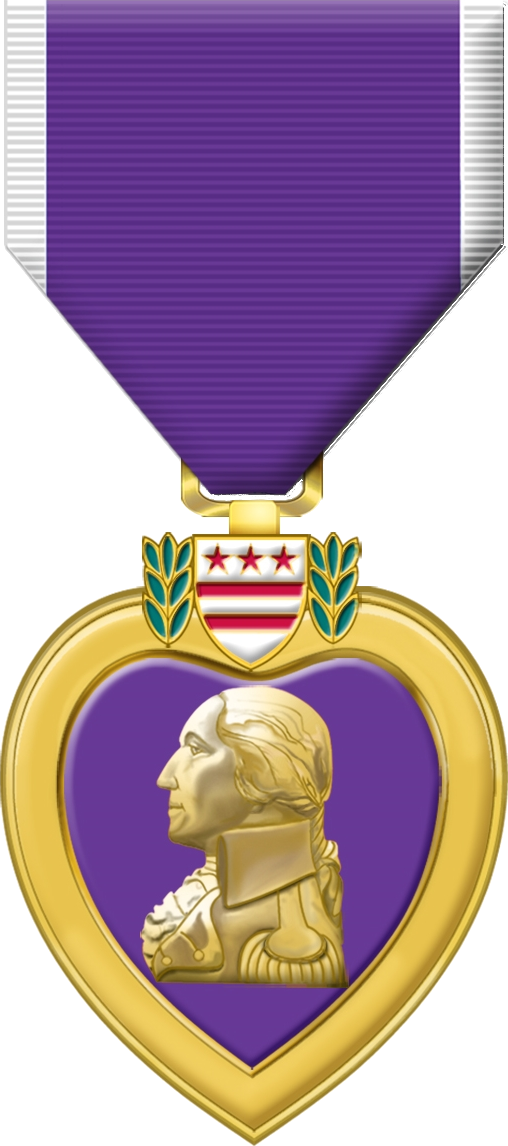
Purple Heart medal

The National Purple Heart Hall of Honor commemorative coins were a series of commemorative coins issued by the United States Mint in 2022 to commemorate the National Purple Heart Hall of Honor in New Windsor, New York and honor members of the United States Armed Forces wounded or killed in combat.

== Legislation ==
The National Purple Heart Hall of Honor Commemorative Coin Act (Pub. L. 116–247 (text) (PDF)) was passed by the 116th Congress and signed into law by President Donald Trump on December 22, 2020. The legislation authorized the United States Mint to strike half dollars, dollars, and half eagles in commemoration of the National Purple Heart Hall of Honor in New Windsor, New York. 50,000 half eagles, 400,000 silver dollars, and 750,000 half dollars were authorized to be struck.

== Designs ==
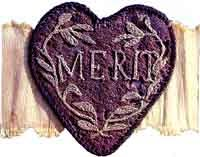
Badge of Military Merit, predecessor to the Purple Heart

The Citizens Coinage Advisory Committee recommended designs for the coins on June 16, 2021. The Commission of Fine Arts recommended designs on June 17. Both committees recommended the same designs, including obverse and reverse design for the silver dollar from two different design pairings proposed. The CCAC recommended edge letting on each coin, but this was not taken further. The coins would feature a reeded edge. After approval by Treasury Secretary Janet Yellen, the final designs were unveiled during a ceremony in New York City on November 11, Veterans Day, attended by then Acting Mint Director Ventris Gibson. Another design unveiling ceremony was held at the National Purple Heart Hall of Honor in on December 4, attended by veterans.

=== Half dollar ===
The half dollar was designed by Artistic Infusion Program artist Beth Zaiken. The obverse, sculpted by Mint artist Craig A. Campbell, depicts a figure in combat uniform with crutches with an amputated left leg. Negative space is used to show the missing leg. A Purple Heart medal appears to the side and a flag appears in the background. The inscription reads ALL GAVE SOME. The reverse, sculpted by Mint artist John P. McGraw, depicts a child holding the cap of an enlisted Marine. A Maine in dress blues stands behind the child in the negative space of a flag. The inscription reads SOME GAVE ALL.

=== Dollar ===
The dollar was designed by AIP artist Heidi Wastweet. The obverse, sculpted by Mint artist Eric David Custer, depicts the Purple Heart medal with five stars representing the five branches of the United States Armed Forces. The inscription reads COMBAT WOUNDED & KILLED IN ACTION. The reverse, sculpted by Campbell, depicts a World War I nurse bandaging a wounded soldier on a stretcher. A limited number of dollars featured a colorized obverse, with the field surrounding George Washington's portrait on the medal colored purple.

=== Half eagle ===
The half eagle was designed by AIP artist Donna Weaver. The obverse, sculpted by Mint Chief Engraver Joseph Menna, depicts the Purple Heart medal and the inscriptions THE PURPLE HEART and A GRATEFUL NATION HONORS AND REMEMBERS. The reverse, sculpted by McGraw, feature Washington's signature on a textured stripe and a depiction of the Badge of Military Merit. Included are the inscriptions 1782 and BADGE OF MILITARY MERIT.

== Production ==
The half dollar was struck in copper-nickel clad, the dollar was struck in .999 fine silver, and the half eagle was struck in .900 fine gold. The coins were struck both in proof and uncirculated finishes. The gold half eagles and the silver dollars were struck at the West Point Mint. The proof half dollar was struck at the San Francisco Mint and the uncirculated half dollar was struck at the Denver Mint. A private company was contracted to colorize the silver dollars, with a limit of 25,000 proof coins. The company, LulaRose, based in Winchester, Massachusetts, was previously contracted to colorized the Basketball Hall of Fame commemorative coins. A total 102,681 coins struck, of which 4,474 were gold half eagles, 62,803 were silver dollars, and 35,404 were clad half dollars. An additional 34,165 proof coins were struck and sold in 3-coin sets.

== Release and reception ==
While originally planned to be released on January 6, 2022, the Mint postposed the launch. The Mint began accepting orders for the coins on its website on February 24, 2022. Both proof and uncirculated coins were sold individually, and a 3-coin proof set was offered. The colorized proof dollar was released on March 24 and sold out within 25 hours. Surcharges from sales of the coins were paid to the National Purple Heart Hall of Honor to support the museum.

== See also ==
- United States commemorative coins
- List of United States commemorative coins and medals (2020s)
