= Apollo 11 50th Anniversary commemorative coins =

American commemorative coin set

The five-ounce silver dollar

Obverse

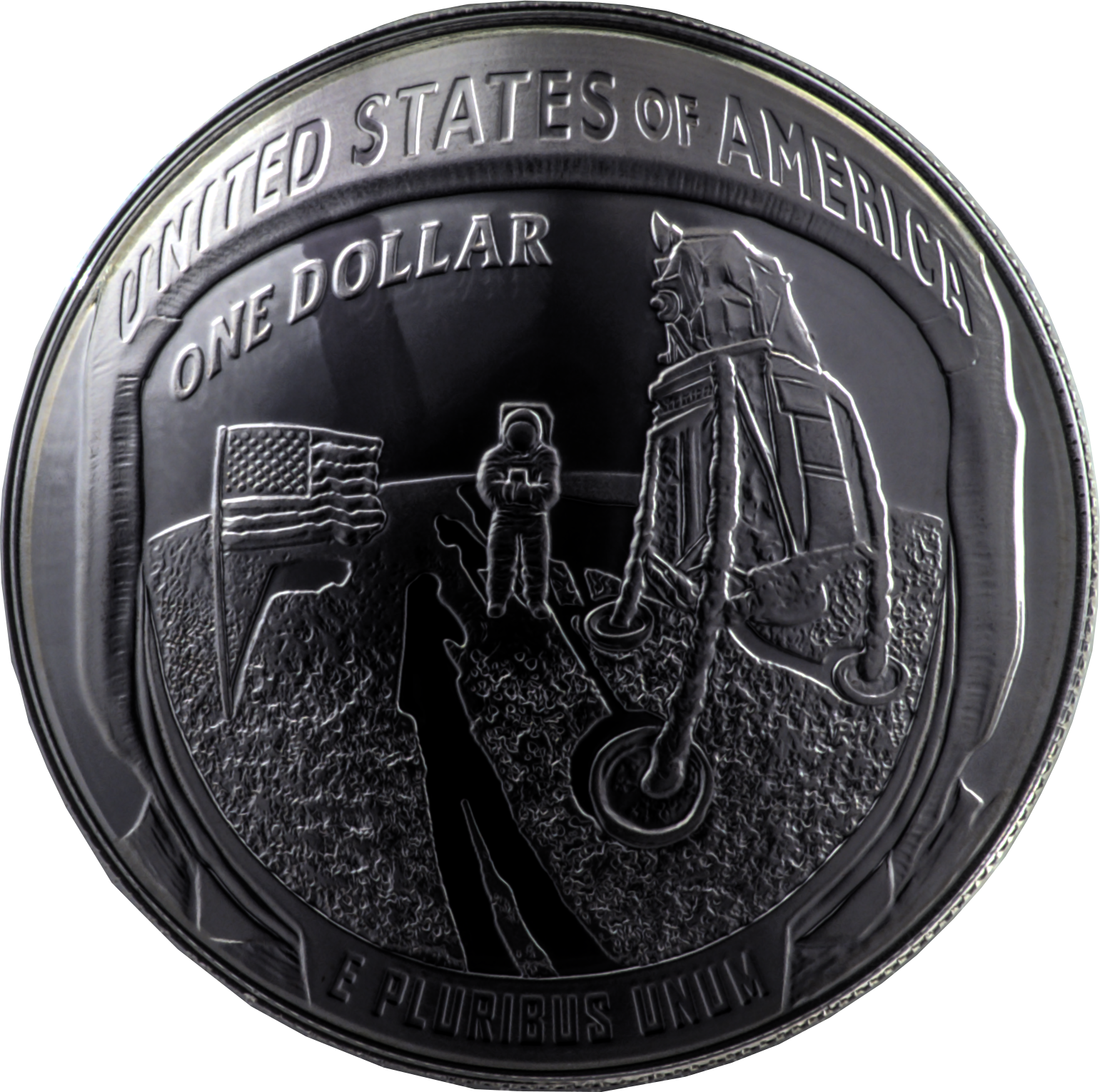
Reverse

The Apollo 11 50th Anniversary commemorative coins were issued by the United States Mint in 2019 to commemorate the 50th anniversary of the first crewed landing on the Moon by Apollo 11 astronauts Neil Armstrong and Buzz Aldrin. Consisting of a gold half eagle ($5 coin), two different sizes of silver dollars, and a copper-nickel clad half dollar, each of the four was issued in proof condition, with all but the larger silver dollar also issued in uncirculated. The gold coins were struck at the West Point Mint, the silver at the Philadelphia Mint and the base metal half dollars at the mints in Denver and San Francisco.

All four coins have the same design. The obverse depicts a bootprint on the lunar surface, based on a photograph taken by Aldrin. That design is by Maine sculptor Gary Cooper, with engraving by Joseph Menna of the Mint. The reverse, as mandated by Congress, depicts the visor and surrounding helmet of Aldrin's space suit, with Armstrong, the U.S. Flag and the Apollo Lunar Module Eagle in the reflection. This is based on a well-known photograph taken by Armstrong, and was created and engraved by Phebe Hemphill of the Mint. The depiction of Aldrin made him the seventh individual to appear on a U.S. coin who was alive at the time the coins were struck.

The Apollo 11 coins are curved, so that the obverse is concave and the reverse is convex. Prior to the release date of January 24, 2019, there was anticipation that some denominations might sell out, as had occurred with the previous U.S. issue of curved pieces, the 2014 National Baseball Hall of Fame coins. This did not prove to be the case, and none of the coins sold out before sales ended on December 27, 2019. It was nevertheless the most successful U.S. commemorative coin program since the Baseball Hall of Fame issue, with over 600,000 Apollo 11 coins sold. The larger silver dollar won the Coin of the Year Award for 2019-dated issues, and was voted Best Collectible Silver Coin at the 2023 Mint Directors Conference.

== Background ==
Buzz Aldrin on the Moon, as photographed by Neil Armstrong, who is visible in the reflection on the visor

In 1961, U.S. President John F. Kennedy challenged his nation to land an astronaut on the Moon by the end of the decade, with a safe return to Earth. The U.S. space agency, NASA, worked towards this goal incrementally, sending astronauts into space during Project Mercury and Project Gemini, leading up to the Apollo program. NASA achieved its goal with Apollo 11, which landed on the Moon on July 20, 1969. Neil Armstrong and Buzz Aldrin walked on the lunar surface while Michael Collins orbited the Moon. The mission returned to Earth on July 24, 1969, fulfilling Kennedy's challenge.

About an hour and a half after Armstrong first set foot on the lunar surface, Aldrin performed the Boot Print Soil Mechanics Experiment. He photographed an undisturbed area of the surface, then made two bootprints and photographed them. Those two bootprints were not disturbed by the astronauts' subsequent activity, and are visible in photographs taken from the Lunar Module Eagle prior to liftoff. About 13 minutes following the taking of the bootprint photographs, after Armstrong had collected a bulk sample of lunar regolith from the surface, Aldrin was supposed to photograph the site the material had been taken from. Instead, he offered the camera to Armstrong, perhaps feeling that as Armstrong had taken the sample, he could make better use of the camera. Armstrong took eight photographs before Aldrin resumed use of the camera; the eighth has been deemed "one of the most famous photos in history: a portrait of Aldrin, his gold-plated sun visor reflecting the photographer and the Lunar Module, the flag, and the moon’s horizon against an unimaginably black sky."

== Proposal and legislation ==
The Apollo 11 coins were the brainchild of Mike Olson, a member of the federal Citizens Coinage Advisory Committee (CCAC) from Iowa, who thought of it in February 2014, several months before his term on the committee ended. He had recently rewatched the film Apollo 13, and felt there should be a coin issue in honor of the fiftieth anniversary of Apollo 11 landing on the Moon. The CCAC was preparing its annual report and he persuaded his colleagues to include a recommendation for Apollo 11 coinage. Olson had left the committee by the time the CCAC prepared its annual report, but the chair, Gary Marks, took up the cause and got it included.

In January 2015, Olson discussed his proposal with Iowa Representative Rod Blum, who referred the matter to Florida's Bill Posey, whose district included the Kennedy Space Center, and who as a young man had worked in the Apollo program. Posey obtained a bipartisan group of cosponsors and introduced legislation in June 2015. Legislation to mark the 25th anniversary of the Moon landing with coins had been introduced into Congress in 1993 but had failed, as had a bill in 2007 for the 50th anniversary of NASA. The Mint had three times previously honored the Moon landings on coins, with the reverses of the Eisenhower dollar (1971) and Susan B. Anthony dollar (1979), (both showing the Apollo 11 mission patch), and with the 2002 Ohio entry in the State Quarters series, depicting an Apollo astronaut. The 2015 bill was referred to the House Committee on Financial Services, where it sat; the website GovTrack.us gave it a 13 percent chance of enactment.

Through 2016, advocates attempted to boost support for the bill, which by November had 298 cosponsors, enough to get a floor vote during the lame-duck session of Congress. Olson continued his lobbying, as did the Astronauts Memorial Foundation and Astronaut Scholarship Foundation, each designated to receive some of the surcharges on the coins. Despite the support of Aldrin and Collins, the surviving Apollo 11 astronauts, the Senate version of the bill had only 11 cosponsors, far fewer than the 67 needed for a vote. If there was no successful vote, the bill would die at the end of the 114th Congress.

House proceedings for HR 2726

On December 5, the last day of the House session, the bill was called up for debate by Congressman Posey, who then addressed the House in support of the bill, recounting the history of Apollo 11. Nydia M. Velázquez of New York and Frederica S. Wilson of Florida spoke of the hundreds of thousands of workers who had made Apollo possible, and applauded the inclusion of the Scholarship Foundation as a beneficiary, hoping the coins would have a legacy of young people entering the sciences. Posey spoke again briefly, and the bill passed without opposition.

A final push by proponents resulted in 70 Senate cosponsors, three more than needed. Arkansas Senator John Boozman brought the bill to the Senate floor on December 9, and it passed without opposition. The bill became Public Law 114–282 with the signature of President Barack Obama on December 16, 2016, one of the final bills he signed as president.

The act required that the coins be issued "in recognition of the 50th anniversary of the first crewed landing on the Moon". They were required to have a curved shape similar to the 2014 National Baseball Hall of Fame commemoratives. These coins, with the concave design for the obverse resembling a baseball glove, had been enormously popular. There were to be up to 50,000 Apollo 11 $5 gold pieces, or half eagles, 400,000 regular-sized silver dollars, 750,000 clad half dollars, and 100,000 additional silver dollars containing five troy ounces of silver and measuring three inches in diameter. All coins would have the same design, and would be available in uncirculated and in proof condition, except the five-ounce silver dollar, which would be in proof only. The design for the concave obverse could be selected through a design competition. A surcharge of $35 on the gold pieces, $50 on the five-ounce silver dollar, $10 on the smaller silver dollar and $5 on the half dollar would be collected. Once the Mint recouped its costs, half the remainder of the money would be distributed to the Smithsonian Institution's National Air and Space Museum (NASM) for its "Destination: Moon" exhibit, one quarter to the Astronauts Memorial Foundation and one quarter to the Astronaut Scholarship Foundation. The coins could only be issued during 2019.

== Design ==
=== Selection ===
From May 1 to June 29, 2017, the Mint accepted submissions for the coins' obverse design. Those whose concepts made the first cut would be notified by July 31, with revised submissions to be made by September 8. The obverse was not to include the image of any living person, including an astronaut, and was to be "emblematic of the United States space program leading up to the first crewed Moon landing". A total of 119 proposals were submitted, and a jury consisting of three members each of the Commission of Fine Arts (CFA) and the CCAC winnowed them down to 18 finalists.

When the CCAC met on October 18, 2017, members were unenthusiastic, with some predicting a sales disaster and wanting to discard all the designs, but the chair, Mary N. Lannin said that one of them must be selected. The Fine Arts Commission met the following day; its members expressed some enthusiasm about the proposed designs. The jury members met and viewed the designs on October 20.

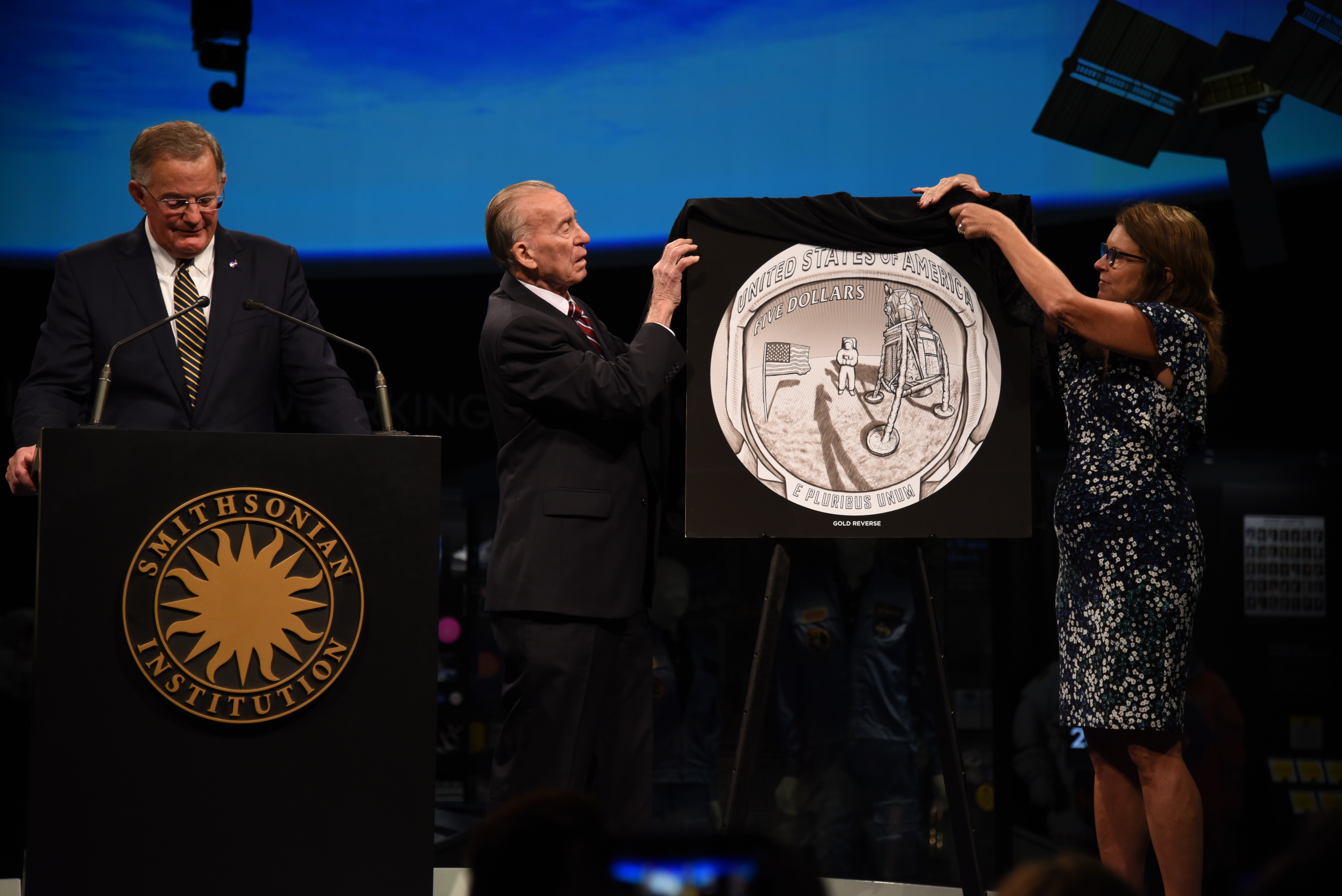
Apollo 7 astronaut Walter Cunningham and Sheryl Chaffee, daughter of Apollo 1 astronaut Roger Chaffee, unveil the reverse design. Mint Director David Ryder stands at lectern.

From the finalists, a design by Maine sculptor and medalist Gary Cooper was selected, depicting the bootprint of an astronaut on the Moon. Cooper had a longtime interest in coinage, and had submitted an unsuccessful entry in the 1998 Sacagawea dollar design competition, as well as an entry, also unsuccessful, for Maine's coin in the State Quarters series. The CFA had commented on the bootprint design, saying that it "may seem overly familiar". During the second round of the Apollo 11 competition, Mint officials had him submit modified versions of his entry, altering the position of elements of the design. It was one of these alternatives that won the competition. For his efforts, Cooper was paid a total of $5,500, with $500 an award for participation in the second round and the remainder the prize for winning. Cooper's concept was adapted for die production by Mint Sculptor-Engraver (now Chief Engraver) Joseph F. Menna.

Artists at the Mint produced three designs for the reverse, and in June 2017, both CFA and CCAC agreed on one of them. That design was by U.S. Mint Sculptor-Engraver Phebe Hemphill, who also engraved her side of the coin. The two winning designs were unveiled on October 11, 2018, at the NASM in Washington, DC, in the presence of dignitaries such as Mint Director David J. Ryder and Apollo 7 astronaut Walt Cunningham. At the unveiling, Ryder stated the five-ounce silver dollars, once placed on sale, could sell out in ten minutes.

=== Description ===
Aldrin's bootprint on the Moon

The shared obverse for the coins, created by Cooper, adapts the well-known photograph of an astronaut's bootprint, taken by Aldrin with a Hasselblad film camera, symbolizing the first step on the Moon. Cooper stated, "I recall seeing those first footprints, and it made so many people feel like that was their own footprint. I’ve never seen anything like that since." He noted that the original photograph had darkness in the recesses of the bootprint, forcing him to be creative. Along the rim are the words MERCURY, GEMINI and APOLLO, separated by depicted phases of the Moon progressing toward full as NASA's programs advance towards the Moon landing. LIBERTY is at the bottom, with above and to each side, the date 2019 (to left) and IN GOD WE TRUST to the right. The initials of Cooper and Menna, and the mint mark of the facility where the coin was struck also appear on the obverse.

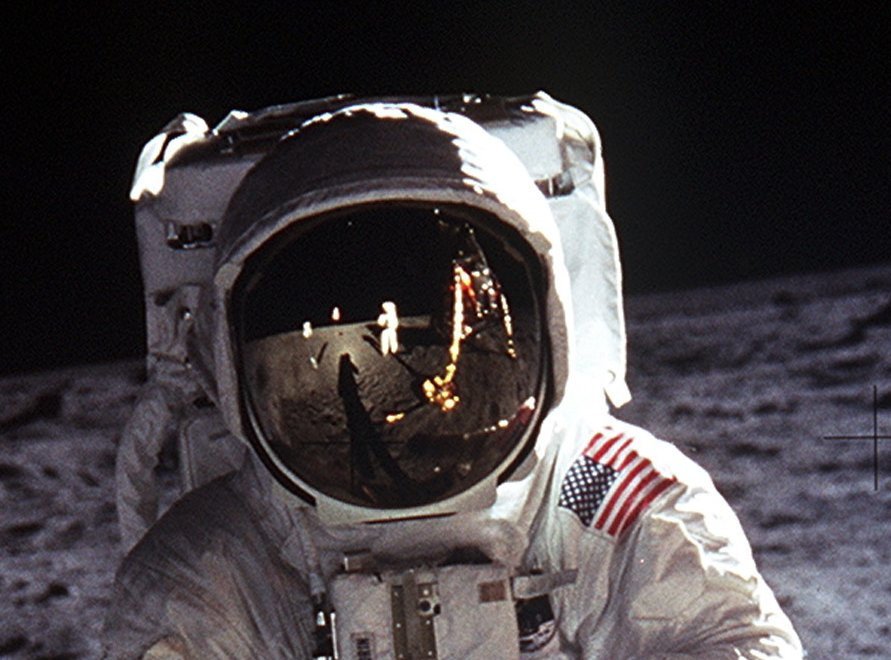
Congress required that the image of Aldrin's helmet with Armstrong reflected in it form the basis for the reverse.

Congress required that the reverse be a "close-up of the famous 'Buzz Aldrin on the Moon' photograph taken July 20, 1969, (Note: July 21, 1969 Universal Time.) that shows just the visor and part of the helmet of astronaut Buzz Aldrin, in which the visor has a mirrored finish and reflects the image of the United States flag and the lunar lander and the remainder of the helmet has a frosted finish." Although it is not usual for a living person to appear on a U.S. coin, Congress mandated it be done in this case, making Aldrin the seventh person depicted on a U.S. coin to be alive at the time it was struck by the Mint—the sixth, Nancy Reagan in 2016, was still alive at the time her entry in the First Spouse gold coin series was minted, but died before the official release. (Note: The previous five were Thomas E. Kilby on the Alabama Centennial half dollar, Calvin Coolidge on the Sesquicentennial half dollar, Carter Glass on the Lynchburg Sesquicentennial half dollar, Joseph Taylor Robinson on the Arkansas-Robinson half dollar and Eunice Shriver on the Special Olympics World Games silver dollar.)

The convex shape of the reverse is meant to evoke the curvature of the visor on an astronaut's helmet. Hemphill stated, "I over-emphasized the curvature [in the scene] to create the illusion of the curved visor." On the coins, the visor is framed by the words UNITED STATES OF AMERICA and E PLURIBUS UNUM, with the denomination appearing in its upper left; the Solar Wind Composition Experiment, visible in the original image, is omitted. In the reflection on the visor may be seen the Lunar Module Eagle, the United States flag (made more prominent than in the original), and the photographer, Neil Armstrong.

== Striking ==
On December 13, 2018, ceremonial first strikes of both sizes of the silver dollar took place at the Philadelphia Mint. Offspring of the Apollo 11 astronauts, Mark Armstrong, Andy Aldrin and Ann Collins struck both size coins. The dignitaries who struck coins would be allowed to purchase them once sales opened to the public. Mint Director Ryder also struck a five-ounce piece and predicted the coinage program would sell out. Such a sellout would generate $14.5 million in surcharges for the beneficiary organizations.

The Mint had difficulty in determining the proper angle for the curves so that the coins would strike fully, working out techniques on the five-ounce dollar and adapting them for the smaller coins. Each die was created using cutting equipment, followed by hand finishing—no master die was used. Early attempts showed die cracks along the legs of the lunar lander, and problems with metal flow at Armstrong's hands. Adjustments, and a switch from .900 silver to .999, alleviated these problems. The two Apollo 11 silver dollars were the first U.S. commemoratives to be struck in .999 silver, with earlier silver commemoratives struck in .900. The change from the Mint's historic standard of .900 occurred because it had become little-used, causing the Mint to place custom orders with refineries; several years earlier, the Mint had obtained permission from Congress to strike coins of not less than 90 percent silver, allowing it to align with other world mints in using .999. The three-inch silver dollar was struck on the Philadelphia Mint's only Graebener GMP 1000 press, obtained to strike the America the Beautiful three-inch quarters. Each die for the five-ounce silver dollar initially took 14 hours to make and would strike about 100 coins; this figure was later reduced to 11.5 hours.

In advance of the opening of sales on January 24, 2019, it was anticipated that some or all of the different varieties of the new coins might quickly sell out, marking the first time that had occurred since the Hall of Fame issue in 2014. That issue had seen the 50,000 gold coins sell out in a matter of minutes, with the 400,000 silver dollars gone in less than two weeks. The clad half dollars had not sold out, but more than 400,000 of the 750,000 had been sold, leading to surcharges totaling nearly $8 million for the designated beneficiary, the Baseball Hall of Fame.

On January 18, introductory prices for the non-gold coins were announced; prices for the gold coins, which would fluctuate based on the market, would be determined closer to the opening of sales. The five-ounce silver dollar, from the Philadelphia Mint, would cost $224.95, with an initial household order limit of one. The smaller silver dollar would cost $54.95 for the proof coin and $51.95 in uncirculated, with a household order limit of 100. The half dollar in uncirculated condition, struck at the Denver Mint, was $25.95 each, and the proof coin (struck at the San Francisco Mint) was $27.95, with no order limit. A set containing both the proof Apollo 11 half dollar and a 2019–S Kennedy half dollar in enhanced reverse proof condition, restricted to 100,000 sets and with an order limit of five, cost $53.95. The set with the Kennedy half was issued to mark the connection between President Kennedy and the American space program. Prior to the January 24 opening of sales, prices for the gold pieces, struck at the West Point Mint, were set at $418.50 in proof and $408.50 in uncirculated, with an initial limit of one gold coin per household, regardless of condition. These prices were set from the Mint's Pricing of Numismatic Gold, Commemorative Gold, and Platinum Products table.

== Distribution ==
=== Release ===
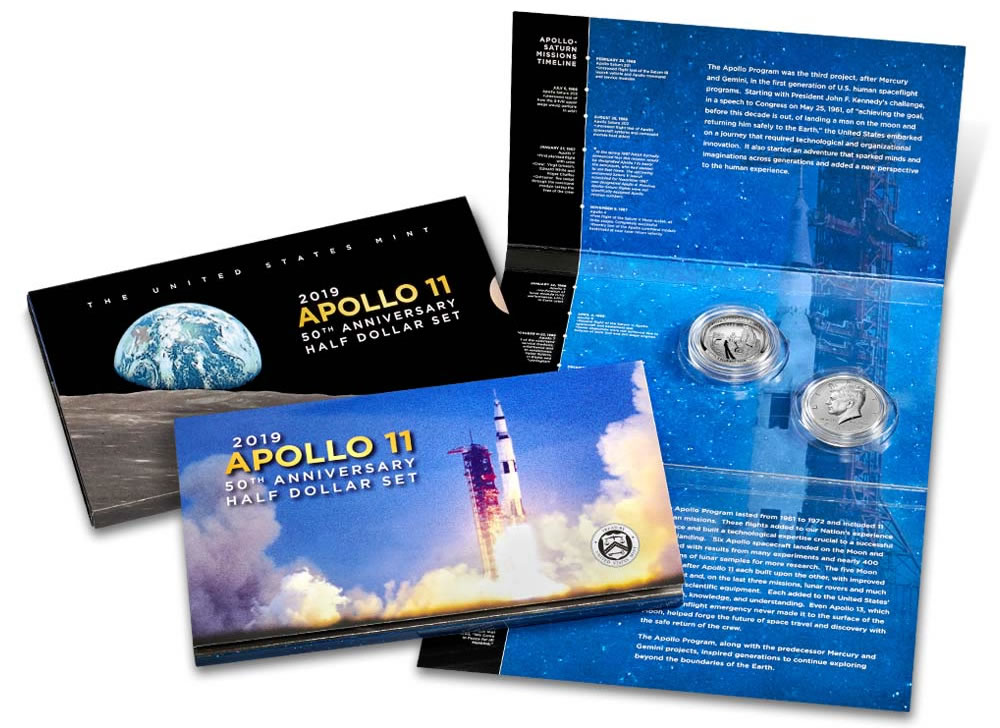
The set with two half dollars offered by the U.S. Mint

A ceremony to mark the release of the Apollo 11 coins was held at the Kennedy Space Center Visitor Complex on January 24, 2019. The CAPCOM during Eagle's landing, Apollo 16 Lunar Module Pilot Charles Duke, spoke at the ceremony, stating the new issue would bring back memories of the day Apollo 11 landed on the Moon. Duke commended that the issue would raise money for worthy causes and stated he planned to buy some of the gold coins. Ryder had been scheduled to speak at the Florida event, but could not attend due to the ongoing partial government shutdown.

The Apollo 11 coins went on sale to the public on January 24, 2019, at 12 noon EST through the Mint's website and via telephone; they were also available at the sales center at Mint headquarters in Washington, at the mints in Philadelphia and Denver, and at the ceremony site at Kennedy Space Center. Collectors reported minimal difficulties in placing their orders online, and although the three-inch dollar went into backorder status within an hour, figures released by the Mint showed that none of the coins had come near sellout on the first day of sales.

The fact that none of the coins sold out on the day of issue brought varied reactions. Dave Harper, editor of Numismatic News, suggested the program might be a failure, and that the sales figures "do show a lack of early enthusiasm already." Olson expressed pleasure with the first day's sales, predicted all would sell out by the end of the year, and noted that no collector had been shut out from getting coins. Coin forum bloggers deemed the sales to be dismal, and that they foretold a poor future for numismatics in the United States.

A total of 296,311 Apollo 11 coins were sold in the first 24 hours, with the five-ounce silver dollar the leader both in number sold (51,271) and percentage of the mintage authorization sold (51.3 percent). At noon EST on January 25, the limit on the number of coins that could be sold to a single household was waived.

=== Continued sales ===
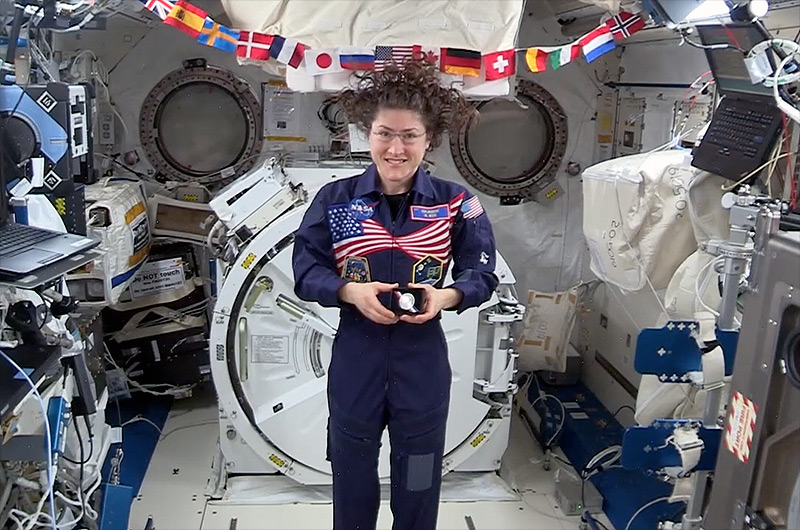
NASA Astronaut Christina Koch holds one of the half dollars aboard the International Space Station

On January 29, the Mint announced that the packaging for the 70,000 half dollar sets that had been shipped, containing a 2019-S Apollo 11 half dollar in proof condition and a 2019–S Kennedy half dollar in enhanced reverse proof finish, contained a factual error. The packaging credited former chief engraver Gilroy Roberts with the design of both sides of the Kennedy half dollar when in fact he had designed only the obverse, with Frank Gasparro responsible for the reverse. The Mint halted shipments and made plans to print corrected packaging. The set was limited to 100,000 as that was the mintage limit of the special Kennedy half. Replacement sleeves were made available beginning in late May to customers who had purchased the half dollar set.

Sales of the half dollar set reached 94,119 by February 10 and it showed as unavailable on the Mint's website. This foretold a sellout of the special Kennedy piece, which was only issued in the set, but not of the Apollo 11 half dollar—only 163,434 of these had been sold as of that date, just over a fifth of the authorized mintage. By February 21, the proof half dollar set had sold out entirely. On February 25 at 3 pm EST, introductory pricing ended, and prices increased by $5.

Ryder had pledged at the December 2018 first strike ceremony to have some of the coins sent into space, and this came to pass on May 4, 2019, when a SpaceX Dragon cargo spacecraft was launched with two 2019-S proof clad half dollars included in the payload for the International Space Station. They returned to Earth on June 3, also aboard a SpaceX Dragon cargo craft. One flown coin was to form part of the "Destination: Moon" exhibit at the Smithsonian and the other to be displayed at Mint headquarters.

On May 6, a product packaging a 2019-S Apollo 11 U.S. half dollar with a curved Australian $5 piece in commemoration of the Moon landing went on sale by the Royal Australian Mint (RAM), with production limited to 10,000. The RAM purchased the coins from the U.S. Mint at a bulk discount; the U.S. Mint provided publicity on its website and a link to the RAM's site. The Mint also partnered with Spain's Royal Mint in issuing sets of coins—both Australia and Spain hosted tracking stations for Apollo. 1,969 of the smaller silver dollar in proof condition were offered by the Royal Canadian Mint, with each coin encased in a silver bar, at a price of C$369.95 or $296.00 in U.S. currency.

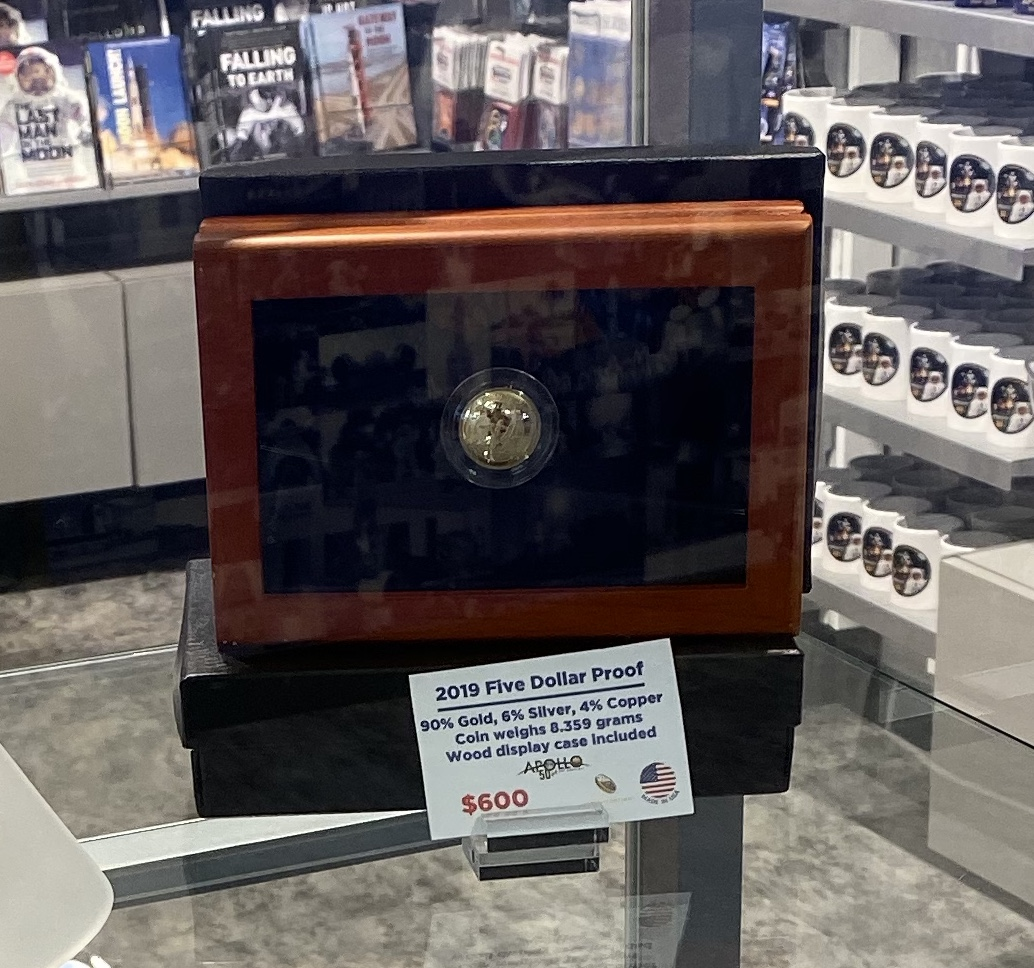
Apollo 11 $5 coin on sale at the Kennedy Space Center Visitor Complex, November 2019

By June 30, the Mint had sold 28,068 of the proof half eagles and 11,168 of the uncirculated. Sales of the smaller silver dollar were 171,957 in proof and 52,870 in uncirculated; of the larger, 61,037 had sold. The 2019–S Apollo 11 half dollar, a proof coin, had sold 99,997 units as part of the half dollar set and 55,297 by itself; the uncirculated half dollar from Denver had sold 36,820 pieces. Stories about the 50th anniversary of the Moon landing boosted sales in July; four of the Mint's ten highest-selling items for the week ending July 21 were Apollo 11 coins as the series enjoyed its best week's sales since February.

Beginning on August 7, the Mint sold sets containing either the $5 piece or the smaller silver dollar in proof condition with a print in honor of Apollo 11 from the Bureau of Engraving and Printing. Prices were set at $78.95 for the print and silver dollar set and $19 above the price of the gold coin for the print/$5 piece set. Due to the rising price of gold, the Mint was selling the $5 piece for $485 by itself. The two new sales options went into backorder status the same day sales began. After 19 days of sales, through August 25, a total of 681 of the print/$5 piece sets and 2,570 of the print/silver dollar sets had sold. As of September 29, sales totaled: 31,331 proof half eagles by themselves (plus 825 sold with the print) and 11,713 uncirculated; 65,463 three-inch silver dollars; 200,712 smaller proof silver dollars by themselves (plus 3,122 with the print) and 56,960 uncirculated; 99,998 half dollar sets; 62,470 additional proof half dollars; and 40,170 uncirculated half dollars. At the Mint's Numismatic Forum held in Philadelphia in October, Mint Director Ryder predicted sales of 90,000 for the five-ounce silver dollar.

=== Conclusion of sales ===
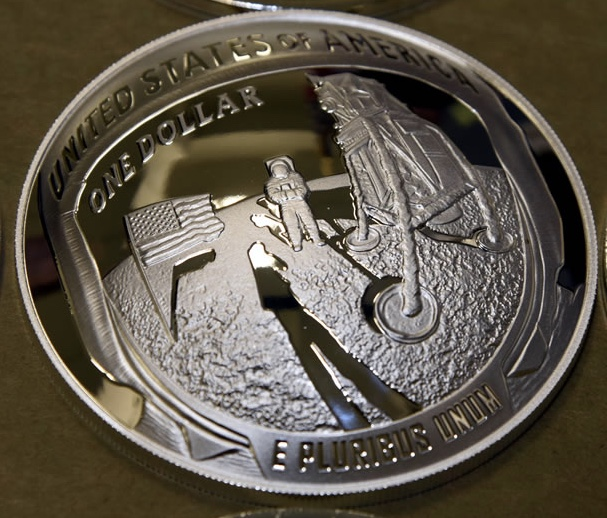
Reverse of silver dollar struck on December 13, 2018

The Mint did not report weekly sales figures after November 3, 2019, due to the departure of the employees responsible for them, and the need to train a replacement. The next update was for sales through December 16, issued by a Mint spokesperson who indicated that regular weekly reports would not resume until January 2020. The report showed sales as: 32,597 proof half eagles by themselves (plus 1,095 sold with the print) and 11,969 uncirculated; 67,683 three-inch silver dollars; 216,077 smaller proof silver dollars by themselves (plus 4,683 with the print) and 59,158 uncirculated; 99,998 half dollar sets; 66,041 additional proof half dollars; and 41,449 uncirculated half dollars. By this time, the uncirculated half eagle was selling for $462.75 and in proof for $472.75. The Apollo 11 coins, as well as the other 2019 commemorative issue, the American Legion Centennial coins, went off sale on December 27, 2019, at 11:59 pm EST. Sales figures through January 12, 2020, released shortly afterwards, were subject to further adjustment by the Mint, but subsequent figures as of 2021 revealed no changes. The Apollo coins outsold the American Legion ones, which included a half dollar, smaller dollar and half eagle, each with the same mintage limits, by vast margins.

William T. Gibbs, managing editor of Coin World, had predicted that the five-ounce silver dollars would sell out in 24 hours, and revisited his prediction in January 2020: "I obviously overestimated interest in the coin, which admittedly had strong selling points: It commemorated a truly significant event and was the nation’s first 5-ounce silver convex/concave coin." Writing in early December, Joshua McMorrow-Hernandez of CoinWeek deemed the Apollo 11 coins "easily the US Mint’s most successful commemorative program since the aforementioned Baseball Hall of Fame coins in 2014. Obviously, the Apollo 11 initiative struck an emotional chord with many folks—the strong numbers clearly suggest many of the people buying these coins are from outside the numismatic community."

In February 2021, the larger silver dollar was named Best Silver Coin and Best Contemporary Event Coin in the annual Coin of the Year competition. The Coin of the Year Award for 2019-dated issues, from among the various category winners, was announced on March 1, 2021, with the Apollo 11 coin the winner. In October 2023, the larger silver dollar was voted Best Collectible Silver Coin at the 2023 Mint Directors Conference.

== Summary of sales ==
Per Mint report of February 14, 2021:

Sales option	Initial price	Mint and mint mark	Authorized mintage	Total sales	Notes
$5 in proof condition	$418.50	West Point (W)	50,000	32,862	
$5 proof with print	$504.00 (price of gold piece plus $19.00)	West Point (W)	50,000	1,162	On sale August 7, 2019
$5 uncirculated	$408.75	West Point (W)	50,000	12,035	46,059 total $5 pieces sold
$1 (larger)	$224.95	Philadelphia (P)	100,000	68,301	
$1 (smaller) proof	$54.95	Philadelphia (P)	400,000	218,995	
$1 (smaller) proof with print	$78.95	Philadelphia (P)	400,000	4.890	On sale August 7, 2019
$1 (smaller) uncirculated	$51.95	Philadelphia (P)	400,000	59,700	283,585 total smaller silver dollars sold
$.50 in proof	$27.95	San Francisco (S)	750,000	66,301	
$.50 proof with 2019–S Kennedy half dollar	$53.95	San Francisco (S)	750,000	99,998	Limited to 100,000 sets. Sold out by February 21, 2019.
$.50 uncirculated	$25.95	Denver (D)	750,000	41,742	208,041 half dollars sold

All pieces on sale January 24, 2019, and off sale after December 27, 2019, except as noted. Prices increased by $5 on February 25 for all options then on sale. Options including $5 pieces had a sales price that fluctuated based on the market price of gold.

== See also ==
- Apollo 11 in popular culture
