= Girl Scouts of the United States of America silver dollar =

Commemorative coin

$1
- Years of minting: 2013

Obverse

Reverse

The Girl Scouts of the United States of America silver dollar is a commemorative coin issued by the United States Mint in 2013.

== Design ==
The obverse depicts three girls who represent the organization. According to the U.S. Mint, the designs "were approved by the Department of the Treasury on July 20, 2012, at the recommendation of the United States Mint, after consultation with Girl Scouts of the USA and the U.S. Commission of Fine Arts, as well as review by the Citizens Coinage Advisory Committee".

== Distribution ==
The coins became available for sale on February 28, 2013.
