= National Baseball Hall of Fame commemorative coins =

2014 U.S. commemorative coin set

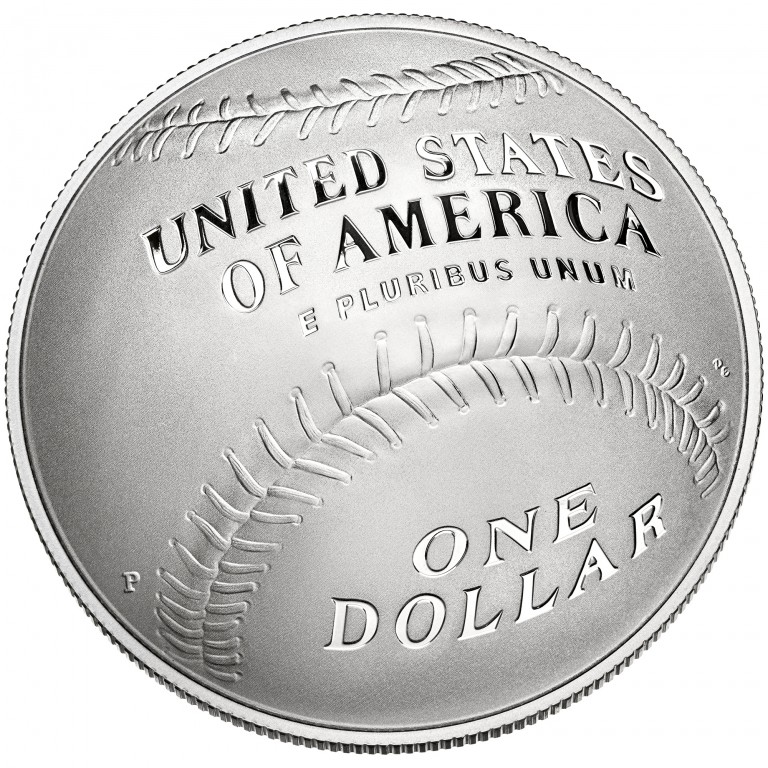
Reverse for the National Baseball Hall of Fame silver dollar, designed by Don Everhart

The National Baseball Hall of Fame commemorative coins were issued by the United States Mint in 2014 to commemorate the 75th anniversary of the opening of the National Baseball Hall of Fame and Museum in Cooperstown, New York. The coins consisted of a copper-nickel clad half dollar, a silver dollar, and a gold half eagle ($5 coin), each issued in both proof and uncirculated varieties. The coins were the first from the Mint to be struck curved, with a concave obverse and a convex reverse. Congress authorized the coins in 2012, with surcharges on sales of the coins to be given to the Hall of Fame to fund its operations.

The coins featured a common obverse from the Californian artist Cassie McFarland whose design, a baseball glove, was selected after a national competition was held. The common reverse, as mandated by Congress, depicts a baseball design from Mint sculptor-engraver Don Everhart. Everhart engraved both the common obverse and reverse of the coins. The Mint faced difficulties during production, as the curved coins were unlike anything it had struck before. The half eagles were minted at the West Point Mint, the dollars were minted at the Philadelphia Mint, and the uncirculated and proof half dollars were minted at the Denver Mint and San Francisco Mint, respectively.

The coins were released to the public on March 27, 2014, and were immediately popular with collectors, with the gold half eagle coins selling out the day of release. The dollar would also sell out and the half dollar saw over half its authorized mintage sold. Surcharges collected from sales of the coins totaled $7.9 million and were paid to the Hall of Fame. The clad half dollar won Coin of the Year and the Most Innovative Coin at the 2016 Coin of the Year Awards. The Mint would continue to issue curved coins, such as the Apollo 11 50th Anniversary commemorative coins in 2019 and the Basketball Hall of Fame commemorative coins in 2020.

== Background and legislation ==
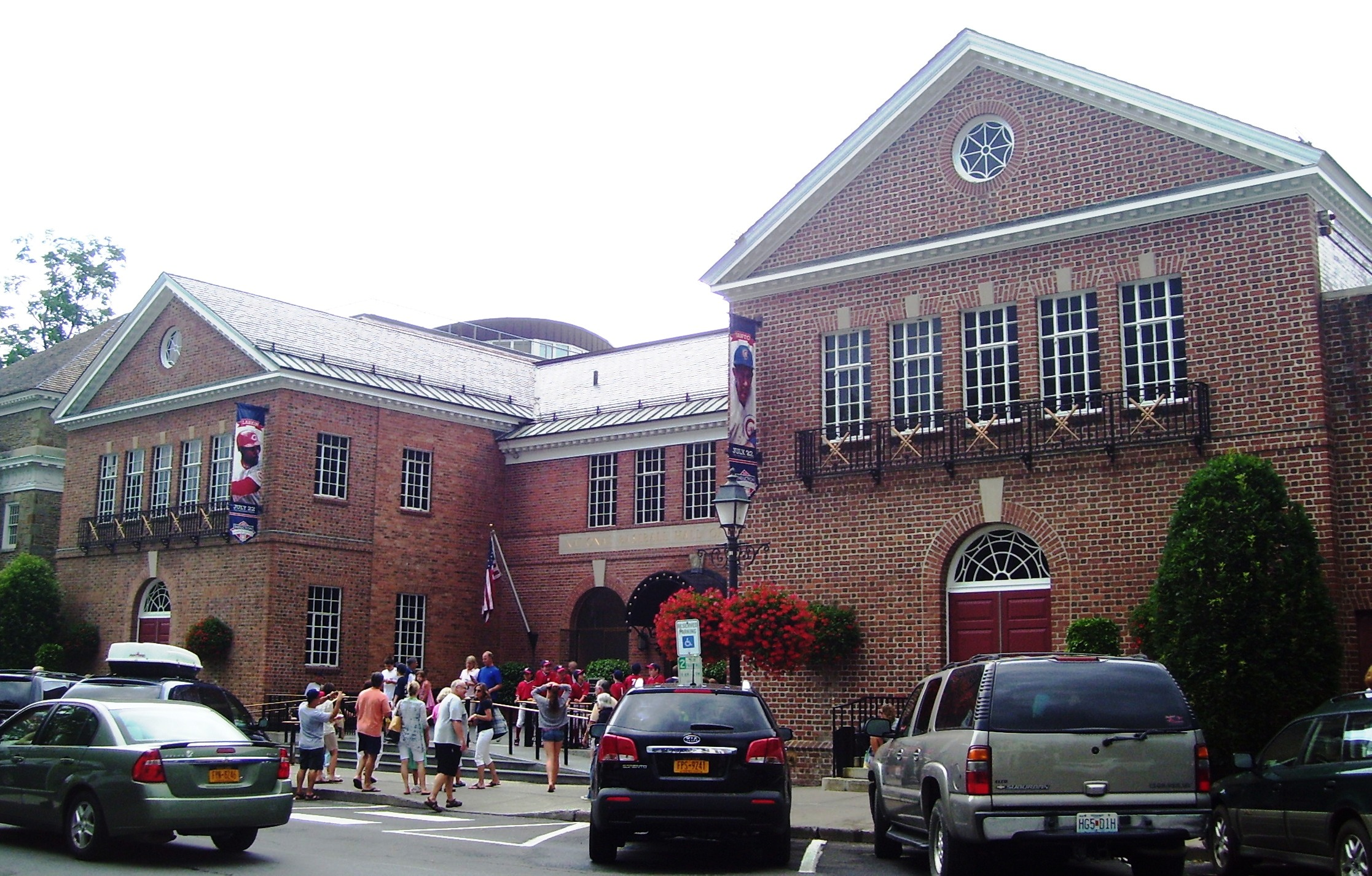
The Hall of Fame in 2012.

=== National Baseball Hall of Fame and Museum ===
The National Baseball Hall of Fame and Museum was opened on June 12, 1939, in Cooperstown, New York, in a centennial celebration of the supposed invention of baseball in 1839 by Abner Doubleday, a myth which has since been disproven. The Hall of Fame honors those who have excelled in playing, managing, and serving the sport. The Hall of Fame also operates a museum for the history of baseball in the United States, displaying exhibits for the public and housing artifacts, photographs, and documents related to the history of baseball.

=== Legislation ===
The National Baseball Hall of Fame Commemorative Coin Act was introduced to the House of Representatives on July 14, 2011, by Representative Richard Hanna of New York's 24th District, where Cooperstown is located, allowing the United States Mint to strike commemorative coins in recognition of the National Baseball Hall of Fame's 75th anniversary. The bill was approved by the House Financial Services Committee on July 20, with an amendment offered by New Mexico Representative Steve Pearce stating that the reverse of the coins must resemble a baseball with a convex shape, citing the 2009 International Year of Astronomy coins produced by the Monnaie de Paris as an example. The bill passed the House on October 11, while a companion bill was introduced in the Senate by Senator Kirsten Gillibrand of New York on January 26, 2012. The legislation received bipartisan support in the Senate, passing with unanimous consent on July 12, 2012. The legislation was enacted into law (Pub. L. 112–152 (text) (PDF)) by President Barack Obama on August 3. The law authorized the Mint to strike and issue 50,000 gold half eagles, 400,000 silver dollars, and 750,000 clad half dollars. Surcharges from the coin would be given to the Hall of Fame, with $5 for each half dollar, $10 for each dollar, and $35 for each half eagle, with a total potential to earn $9.5 million for the Hall of Fame.

During initial test strikes in 2013, the Mint discovered that the curved coins would have a slightly smaller diameter, described as a "few thousandths of an inch", than what was authorized under the bill, meaning that custom planchets were needed to meet the requirements. To save costs, Representative Hanna introduced another bill on March 12, 2013, to amend the law so that the Mint could use existing planchets to strike the coins. The bill, entitled "To specify the size of the precious-metal blanks that will be used in the production of the National Baseball Hall of Fame commemorative coins", passed the House by voice vote on April 24 and passed the Senate on May 7 by unanimous consent before being signed into Public Law 113–10 by President Obama on May 17. ABC News and the Pew Research Center cited the law as an example of the 113th Congress's minor legislation.

== Design ==
=== Obverse ===
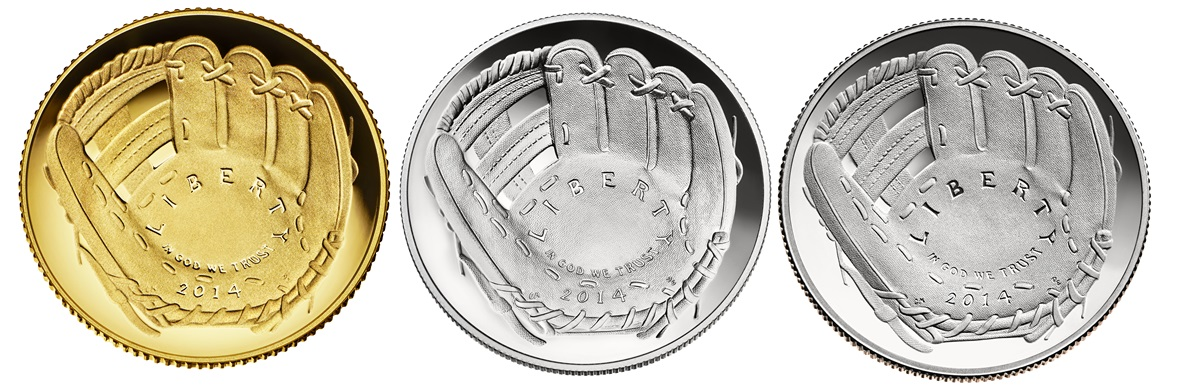
Obverse of the gold half eagle, silver dollar, and clad half dollar, each depicting the common baseball glove design from Cassie McFarland, adapted by Mint engraver Don Everhart.

The law mandated that a common obverse design "emblematic of the game of baseball" was to be selected from a public competition, with final approval from the Secretary of Treasury. A ceremony led by Gillibrand and Hanna in a Senate hearing room launched the competition, featuring retired Baltimore Orioles third baseman Brooks Robinson as a speaker. The competition ran one month from April 11 to May 11, 2013, with a maximum limit of 10,000 designs allowed. The Mint stated they would only accept submissions from those age 14 and above and that designs could not be submitted by Department of Treasury or Mint employees, contractors, and their immediate family to avoid the perception of favoritism. The Mint received 178 design proposals and a team of three Mint engravers and one Bureau of Engraving and Printing designer, receiving input from the Hall of Fame and other Mint staff, selected 24 semifinalist designs. A panel of baseball players in the Hall of Fame, consisting of Robinson, Dave Winfield, Ozzie Smith, Don Sutton, and Joe Morgan, selected 17 finalist designs.

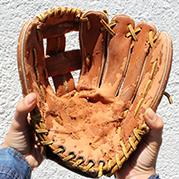
McFarland modeled her design from her own baseball glove

The Commission of Fine Arts (CFA) met on July 18 to discuss the finalist designs and quickly agreed that the best design was one submitted by Cassie McFarland, a graphic artist from San Luis Obispo, California, which featured a baseball glove. During their July 23 meeting, the Citizens Coinage Advisory Committee (CCAC) shared enthusiasm for McFarland's design, with all ten committee members giving it the highest possible score from within the committee's internal scoring system. With the backing of the CCAC and CFA, Acting Mint Director Richard Peterson recommended McFarland's design to Acting Deputy Treasury Secretary Mary J. Miller, who approved it September 9. McFarland was unaware that her design was selected by the CFA until she was contacted by the numismatic magazine Coin World for an interview. She had only discovered the competition near the last day after searching online for information about Shell's "Mr. President" coin game for an art project and decided to enter it on a whim. An unveiling ceremony had been planned on October 8 in Washington, D.C., however it was cancelled due to the ongoing federal government shutdown. McFarland was awarded $5,000 for winning the competition.

McFarland's design, titled "A Hand Full of Gold", was modeled off a worn baseball glove that belonged to her family, which she later donated to the Hall of Fame. McFarland wanted her design to convey the texture of a baseball glove, with the concavity of the glove working with the concavity of the coin. The common inscriptions LIBERTY and IN GOD WE TRUST appear in the center of the glove, with the date 2014 below. McFarland's original design included wheat sheaves, citing her family's connection to the Grange. Some members of the CFA were not happy with the wheat sheaves on the design and recommended that they be removed. Mint engraver Don Everhart, when adapting the design for use on the coin, removed the wheat sheaves as he believed it would be confused with the glove's stitching. Everhart used his own son's Little League glove as a reference when sculpting.

=== Reverse ===
The law required that the common reverse of the coins must depict "a baseball similar to those used by Major League Baseball." Mint artists created six designs that were presented to the CCAC during a meeting on March 11, 2013, however the committee members were shocked at what they saw. Chairperson Gary Marks and member Erik Jensen wanted the prominent area of the convex design to display the wording UNITED STATES OF AMERICA and were disappointed with the six designs. During the meeting, Mint sculptor-engraver Don Everhart and Mint employee Steve Antonucci quickly sketched a seventh design based on the second design presented, which the committee voted overwhelmingly to endorse. The CFA endorsed the same design to Acting Mint Director Peterson on March 28. The final reverse design was unveiled during Hall of Fame Induction Weekend at the Hall of Fame in Cooperstown on July 26 after receiving approval from Deputy Treasury Secretary Neal S. Wolin.

The common reverse design depicts a baseball with the denomination of each coin below the bottom stitching, with HALF DOLLAR for the clad half dollar, ONE DOLLAR for the silver dollar, and FIVE DOLLARS on the gold half eagle. The motto E PLURIBUS UNUM appears under UNITED STATES OF AMERICA centered on the axis of the ball. Everhart wanted the design to use the convex shape of the coins to replicate that of a baseball. Evarhart's initials "DE" appear towards the right of the denomination, near the rim.

== Striking ==
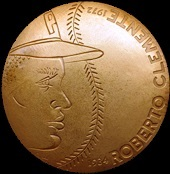
Copper issue of the curved 1973 Congressional Gold medal presented to Roberto Clemente

The law stated, if possible, that the dollar and half eagle were to be struck curved, so that the reverse would be "convex to more closely resemble a baseball", directly referencing the curved 2009 International Year of Astronomy coins issued by the Monnaie de Paris. The half dollar was originally intended to be struck flat, but Acting Mint Director Peterson decided that it should be struck curved, adding to the challenges the Mint faced. The Mint had never struck a curved coin before; it had however struck a curved Congressional Gold medal in 1973 for Pittsburgh Pirates right fielder Roberto Clemente, with the copper variants sold to the public.

Die preparations typically began for commemorative coins after designs had been approved, but the Mint anticipated technical challenges and began work on them before the reverse and obverse designs were approved. The Mint consulted with the Perth Mint and the Royal Australian Mint during their initial research; the Royal Australian Mint had issued a curved five dollar coin in 2012 to commemorate the Southern Cross. The team that worked on prototyping the dies was led by Steve Antonucci, the Mint's manager of digital development, who acquired one of the French coins to analyze. After creating a 3-D model of the French coin, Antonucci determined that they could mint a more pronounced strike for the baseball coins. The team then used CNC milling to create their own test dies, a first for the team, featuring a nonsense design of a billiard ball and pool player.

The half dollar faced numerous issues, as it was not intended originally to be curved. The half dollar was clad; it was composed of a copper core with an outer layer made of a copper-nickel alloy. During test strikes, the metal in the clad planchets separated, a problem known as delamination, leading to the Mint's reduction of the curvature of the half dollar. This was not an issue for the silver and gold coins, as they were solid alloys as opposed to clad. The designs were also tweaked, with adjustments made to the lettering to fit the dome, and the glove was to have a leather-like texture achieved with laser frosting for the proof issues. The dome of the gold half eagle would be 0.085 inch (2.159 millimeters), the silver dollar 0.150 inch (3.81 millimeters), and the clad half 0.058 inch (1.4732 millimeters). Die life was also a problem for the half dollar, which was solved by changing the slope of the curve, reducing the rim, and by swapping the reverse and obverse dies on the coin press.

The half dollar coins had a composition of 91.67% copper and 8.33% nickel and each weighed 11.34 g (0.40 oz). The dollar coins had a composition of 90% silver and 10% copper and each weighed 26.73 g (0.94 oz). The half eagle coins had a composition of 90% gold and 10% copper and each weighted 8.359 g (0.295 oz). All the coins had reeded edges. The Denver Mint struck the uncirculated clad half dollars and the San Francisco Mint struck the proof half dollars. The Philadelphia Mint struck both the proof and uncirculated silver dollars and the West Point Mint struck both the proof and uncirculated gold half eagles.

== Release and reception ==
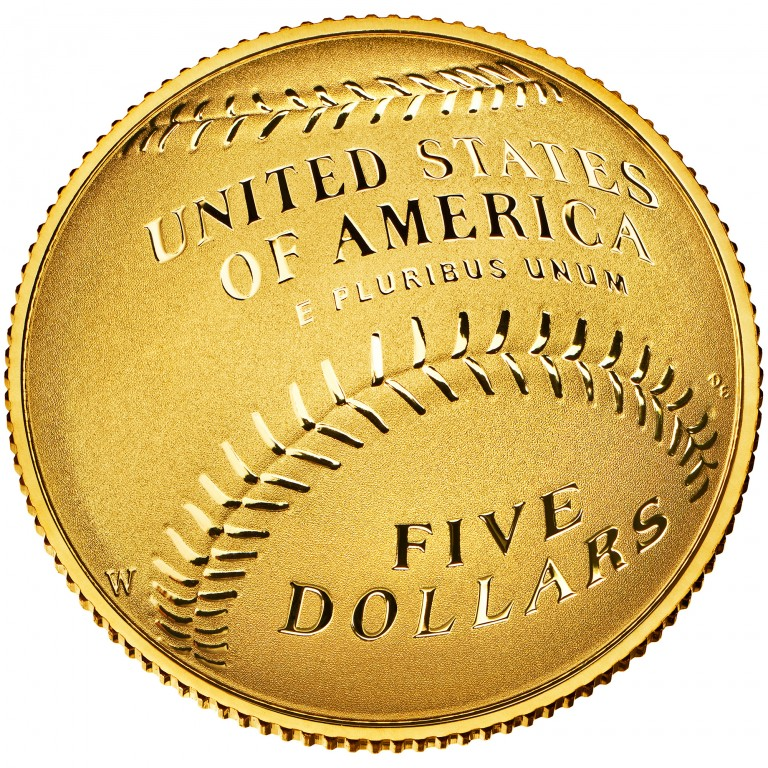
Reverse for the gold half eagle. The gold half eagle sold out the day of issue.

The Mint anticipated high demand for the coin, and before release planned to use an online waiting room as a queue to avoid their website from crashing. The coins were released to the public on March 27, 2014, with the first coin being sold at the Whitman Expo, a major coin show held in Baltimore. At the coin show, numismatist Q. David Bowers remarked that "the crowd of buyers in line to make purchases at the U.S. Mint sales display extended partway across the bourse floor, across the lobby of the Baltimore Convention Center, and into the street!" There was also a long line at the Mint's physical store in Washington, D.C. The authorized mintage of gold half eagles sold out in hours, leaving many collectors frustrated with their experience in the online waiting room. The maximum mintage of silver dollars was reached on April 9, but some orders were shipped as late as December 2014.

Acting Mint Director Peterson described the program as a "resounding success" the Mint's 2014 annual report. The Hall of Fame received $7.9 million from surcharges on the coins. The gold coins were highly sought after on the secondary market. Coin grading companies PCGS and NGC signed deals with Hall of Fame players to sign graded coin slabs. A silver dollar graded MS-70 by PCGS with a Cal Ripken Jr. signature sold for $500.

The designs received praise from numismatists; at the 2016 Coin of the Year Awards for coins dated 2014, the clad half dollar won Coin of the Year and Most Innovative Coin and the gold half eagle won Best Gold Coin. The Mint would continue to issue curved coins, such as the Apollo 11 50th Anniversary commemorative coins and the Basketball Hall of Fame commemorative coins, in 2019 and 2020 respectively.

=== Pricing and sales ===
The price for the half dollars rose $4 and the prices for the dollars and half eagles rose $5 one month after release. The price of the half eagles was subject to change as the market value of gold changed.

A 2015 audit from the Department of Treasury Inspector General revealed the Mint had oversold the half eagle by 104 pieces. The Mint struck an extra 250 pieces in August 2014 due to the high demand and in anticipation of returns. They were sent to a Pitney Bowes fulfillment center marked as "do not sell" but were mistakenly distributed by PFSweb and sold. The mintage for the half eagle ended up totaling 50,104, higher than the authorized limit of 50,000. The Mint has since stopped shipping out overage coinage to fulfillment centers and now handles returns from its own production facilities.

National Baseball Hall of Fame commemorative coin sales (as of December 2014)
Sales option	Pre-issue price	Mint and mint mark	Authorized mintage	Total sales	Notes
$5 proof	$436.90	West Point (W)	50,000	32,427	
$5 uncirculated	$431.90	West Point (W)	50,000	17,677	
$1 proof	$51.95	Philadelphia (P)	400,000	268,007	
$1 uncirculated	$47.95	Philadelphia (P)	400,000	131,935	
50¢ proof	$19.95	San Francisco (S)	750,000	257,607	
50¢ uncirculated	$18.95	Denver (D)	750,000	147,556	
50¢ uncirculated with Young Collectors Set	$24.95	Denver (D)	750,000	29,683	Included presentation folder targeted towards kids. Released on July 28.

== See also ==
- List of United States commemorative coins and medals (2010s)
- United States commemorative coins
- Apollo 11 50th Anniversary commemorative coins
