= Cassie McFarland =

American graphic designer

Cassie Maeve McFarland (born October 4, 1985) is an American graphic artist based out of California. She is best known as the creator of the winning design for the common obverse of the 2014 commemorative coins celebrating the National Baseball Hall of Fame.

== Biography ==
Cassie McFarland grew up in the historic railroad town of Roseville. Her parents are Robert and Wendy McFarland.

=== Education ===
She attended California Polytechnic State University in San Luis Obispo, CA, earning a Bachelor of Fine Arts, Studio Art and Design degree in 2008.

== Works and awards ==
Cassie McFarland works in the fields of figurative painting and photography. There is a strong narrative tendency to her work, shaped by personal nostalgia and the grandeur and sweep of the American landscape.

While attending Cal Poly, she received the following awards:

- Studio Arts Concentration Award, Annual Award for Junior Standing, Department of Art & Design
- Cal Poly Arts Award
- Studio Art Scholarship, Annual Award for Graduating Students, Department of Art & Design

She has also used her art training to improve the mental and physical health of the elderly by assisting with the art therapy portion of a respite day program that specializes in multi-sensory activities, with an emphasis on developmental communication.

Based out of San Luis Obispo, Ms. McFarland maintains strong ties to the local arts communities. This includes working with a small group of other local San Luis Obispo artists as part of a professional collective called Yoke. The group seeks to make the visual and performing arts an even more active presence within their community. Yoke also facilitates collaboration between its members while helping to produce and exhibit each artist's work individually.

== 2014 National Baseball Hall of Fame Commemorative Coin ==
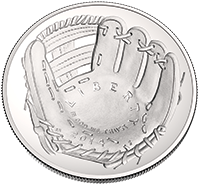
Final design of the 2014 National Baseball Hall of Fame commemorative coin.

On September 4, 2013, the United States Department of the Treasury selected her design as the winning entry in the 2014 National Baseball Hall of Fame commemorative coin competition, which ran from April 11 to 11 May of that year.

The contest was authorized by the 2014 National Baseball Hall of Fame Commemorative Coin Act (Public Law 112-152), signed into law by President Barack Obama on August 3, 2013. All told, the Treasury Department received 178 original entries - including McFarland's, which she submitted on the last day of the contest (11 May) after having happened across the competition online while researching another art project involving Shell gas station tokens.

Contest semi-finalists were chosen by three U.S. Mint sculptor-engravers and one banknote designer from the Bureau of Engraving and Printing. The four judges scored each entry according to artistic merit and suitability or adaptability to a coin format.

16 finalists were then selected based on scores given to the semi-finalist designs by a group of five members of the Baseball Hall of Fame, including Joe Morgan, Brooks Robinson, Ozzie Smith, Don Sutton, and Dave Winfield. The finalists were then reviewed by the United States Commission of Fine Arts, the Citizens Coinage Advisory Committee, and the National Baseball Hall of Fame and Museum. Acting Director of the Mint Richard Peterson then culled together the preceding reviews and comments before making a final recommendation to Treasury Secretary Jacob "Jack" Lew.

Due to the government shutdown of October 2013, there was no public unveiling ceremony. The Mint announced McFarland's design as the winner on its website on October 8, 2013

McFarland herself didn't find out until Coin World, an American numismatic and coin collecting magazine, contacted her for an interview.

=== Design ===
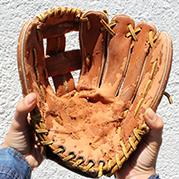
The "well-loved" glove that served as a model for Cassie McFarland's design.

Cassie McFarland's winning design, entitled "A Hand Full of Gold", was modeled on a time-worn, "well-loved" baseball glove that had been in her family since she was a young girl.

However, her initial design concept was "quirky" and "abstract". She briefly considered designing the coin to have the feel of a peanut shell due to peanuts being so strongly associated with ballparks and nostalgia for the game of baseball. McFarland soon decided against the idea out of deference to the feelings of people with peanut allergies, and eventually decided that she didn't want her final design to be "harsh and geometric".

She then settled on the simple baseball glove as the main motif of her design due to its inherent Americana and nostalgic appeal. It also made effective aesthetic use of the concave shape of the coin's obverse. The 2014 National Baseball Hall of Fame commemorative coin is the first scyphate coinage ever produced by the U.S. Mint, as authorized by Section 3(d) of the 2014 National Baseball Hall of Fame Commemorative Coin Act.

Specifically, the law calls for a coin produced

"in a fashion similar to the 2009 International Year of Astronomy coins issued by Monnaie de Paris, the French Mint, so that the reverse of the coin is convex to more closely resemble a baseball and the obverse concave, providing a more dramatic display of the obverse design chosen pursuant to section 4(c)."

A few drafts later, McFarland submitted her final design. It featured a wheat motif that curved around the bottom of the glove, from the tip of the thumb to the tip of the little finger. She included the wheat not only as another nod to a nostalgic American past, but also as a reference to the Grange movement with which her family has been involved for so long. U.S. Mint Sculptor-Engraver Don Everhart - who also designed the common reverse for the Baseball Hall of Fame coin program - removed the wheat from the coin's production design, presumably in order to facilitate its reproduction on actual coins.

Cassie McFarland received $5,000 for her winning design, and her initials appear on the obverse as well.
