= List of United States commemorative coins (2020s) =

== 2020 ==
=== Non-circulating coins ===
Face value	Coin	Obverse design	Reverse design	Composition	Mintage	Available	Obverse	Reverse
50¢	Basketball Hall of Fame half dollar	TBA	Basketball	Cu 92%, Ni 8%	Authorized: 750,000 (max)	TBA		
$1	Basketball Hall of Fame dollar	TBA	Basketball	Ag 99.9%	Authorized: 400,000 (max)	TBA		
$5	Basketball Hall of Fame half eagle	TBA	Basketball	Au 90%, Ag 6%, Cu 4%	Authorized: 50,000 (max)	TBA		
$1	Women's Suffrage Centennial dollar	TBA		Ag 99.9%	Authorized: 400,000 (max)	TBA		
$10	Mayflower 400th Anniversary eagle	TBA	TBA	Au	----	TBA		
$10	Barbara Bush eagle	Barbara Bush	TBA	Au 99.99%	----	TBA		

=== Circulating coins ===
Face value	Coin	Obverse design	Reverse design	Mintage	Obverse	Reverse
25¢	National Park of American Samoa quarter	George Washington	Samoa flying fox mother and pup	498,000,000		
25¢	Weir Farm National Historic Site quarter	George Washington	Artist painting outside Weir Farm	280,600,000		
25¢	Salt River Bay National Historical Park and Ecological Preserve quarter	George Washington	Young red mangrove tree	1,092,800,000		
25¢	Marsh-Billings-Rockefeller National Historical Park quarter	George Washington	Young girl planting a Norway Spruce seedling	650,400,000		
25¢	Tallgrass Prairie National Preserve quarter	George Washington	Regal fritillary	246,600,000		
$1	Native American dollar	Sacagawea	TBA	2,600,000	see article: Sacagawea dollar	
$1	George H. W. Bush dollar	George H. W. Bush	Statue of Liberty	----		
$1	Connecticut dollar	Statue of Liberty	Gerber Variable Scale being used to enlarge shape of state of Connecticut	----		
$1	Massachusetts dollar	Statue of Liberty	Early rotary dial	----		
$1	Maryland dollar	Statue of Liberty	Hubble Space Telescope orbiting Earth	----		
$1	South Carolina dollar	Statue of Liberty	Septima Clark marching with African American students	----		

== 2021 ==
=== Non-circulating coins ===
Face value	Coin	Obverse design	Reverse design	Composition	Mintage	Available	Obverse	Reverse
$1	Christa McAuliffe dollar	Christa McAuliffe	TBA	Ag 99.9%	Authorized: 350,000 (max)	January 28, 2021		
$1	Morgan Dollar (no mint mark)	Liberty	Eagle clasping arrows and olive branch	Ag 99.9%	Authorized: 250,000 (max)	August 10, 2021		
$1	Morgan Dollar (D mint mark)	Liberty	Eagle clasping arrows and olive branch	Ag 99.9%	Authorized: 250,000 (max)	August 3, 2021		
$1	Morgan Dollar (S mint mark)	Liberty	Eagle clasping arrows and olive branch	Ag 99.9%	Authorized: 250,000 (max)	August 3, 2021		
$1	Morgan Dollar (CC privy mark)	Liberty	Eagle clasping arrows and olive branch	Ag 99.9%	Authorized: 250,000 (max)	May 24, 2021		
$1	Morgan Dollar (O privy mark)	Liberty	Eagle clasping arrows and olive branch	Ag 99.9%	Authorized: 250,000 (max)	May 24. 2021		
$1	Peace Dollar	Liberty	A perched bald eagle	Ag 99.9%	Authorized: 200,000 (max)	August 10, 2021		
50¢	National Law Enforcement Memorial and Museum half dollar	TBA	TBA	Cu 92%, Ni 8%	Authorized: 750,000 (max)	January 28, 2021		
$1	National Law Enforcement Memorial and Museum dollar	TBA	TBA	Ag 99.9%	Authorized: 400,000 (max)	January 28, 2021		
$5	National Law Enforcement Memorial and Museum half eagle	TBA	TBA	Au	Authorized: 50,000 (max)	January 28, 2021		

=== Circulating coins ===
Face value	Coin	Obverse design	Reverse design	Mintage	Obverse	Reverse
25¢	Tuskegee Airmen National Historic Site quarter	George Washington	Tuskegee Airman suiting up with two P-51 Mustangs flying overhead	----		
$1	Native American dollar	Sacagawea	Two feathers and five stars indicating Native American military service	----	see article: Sacagawea dollar	
$1	New Hampshire dollar	Statue of Liberty	Ralph Baer's Brown Box game Handball	----		
$1	Virginia dollar	Statue of Liberty	Cross section cut away of the Chesapeake Bay Bridge–Tunnel	----		
$1	New York dollar	Statue of Liberty	A packet boat on the Erie Canal being pulled	----		
$1	North Carolina dollar	Statue of Liberty	A lamp of knowledge on a stack of books with "first public university" on the middle book, and olive branches around the side	----		

== 2022 ==
=== Non-circulating coins ===
Face value	Coin	Obverse design	Reverse design	Composition	Mintage	Available	Obverse	Reverse
50¢	National Purple Heart Hall of Honor half dollar	A military figure with an amputated leg on crutches and the words "ALL GAVE SOME"	A boy holding the dress cap of an enlisted Marine with the silhouette of a Marine behind him and the words "SOME GAVE ALL"	Cu: 92% Ni: 8%	Authorized: 750,000 (max) Uncirculated: TBA Proof: TBA	TBD		
$1	National Purple Heart Hall of Honor dollar	Purple Heart medal	A World War I-era nurse bandaging a wounded service member on a stretcher	Ag: 90% Cu: 10%	Authorized: 400,000 (max) Uncirculated: TBA Proof: TBA	TBD		
$5	National Purple Heart Hall of Honor half eagle	Purple Heart medal	George Washington’s signature under the Badge of Military Merit over a textured stripe	Au: 90% Alloy: 10%	Authorized: 50,000 (max) Uncirculated: TBA Proof: TBA	TBD		
50¢	Negro Leagues Baseball half dollar	A Negro Leagues tour bus	A group of five Negro Leagues Baseball players	Cu: 92% Ni: 8%	Authorized: 400,000 (max) Uncirculated: TBA Proof: TBA	January 6, 2022		
$1	Negro Leagues Baseball dollar	A pitcher in mid-throw with the baseball in the foreground	A player’s eye view of a pitch being delivered to the catcher at the plate	Ag: 90% Cu: 10%	Authorized: 400,000 (max) Uncirculated: TBA Proof: TBA	January 6, 2022		
$5	Negro Leagues Baseball half eagle	Negro National League founder Rube Foster with his signature	Gesture of tipping a baseball cap	Au: 90% Alloy: 10%	Authorized: 50,000 (max) Uncirculated: TBA Proof: TBA	January 6, 2022		

=== Circulating coins ===
Face value	Coin	Obverse design	Reverse design	Composition	Mintage	Available	Obverse	Reverse
25¢	Maya Angelou American Women quarter	George Washington	Maya Angelou	TBA	Authorized: TBA Uncirculated: TBA Proof: TBA	January 3, 2022		
25¢	Sally Ride American Women quarter	George Washington	Sally Ride	TBA	Authorized: TBA Uncirculated: TBA Proof: TBA	March 22, 2022		
25¢	Wilma Mankiller American Women quarter	George Washington	Wilma Mankiller	TBA	Authorized: TBA Uncirculated: TBA Proof: TBA	June 6, 2022		
25¢	Nina Otero-Warren American Women quarter	George Washington	Nina Otero-Warren	TBA	Authorized: TBA Uncirculated: TBA Proof: TBA	August 15, 2022		
25¢	Anna May Wong American Women quarter	George Washington	Anna May Wong	TBA	Authorized: TBA Uncirculated: TBA Proof: TBA	2022		
$1	Native American dollar	Sacagawea	Ely S. Parker			2022	see article: Sacagawea dollar	
$1	Rhode Island dollar	Statue of Liberty	Nathanael Herreshoff's famous Reliance yacht at full speed in the waters surrounding Rhode Island bordered by a rope evoking the nautical scene			2022		
$1	Vermont dollar	Statue of Liberty	A snowboarder performing a trick set against a mountainous winter skyline inspired by the landscape of Vermont			2022		
$1	Kentucky dollar	Statue of Liberty	A banjo representing Kentucky bluegrass music			2022		
$1	Tennessee dollar	Statue of Liberty	A farm in the Tennessee Valley Authority area with newly installed power lines lining the road			2022		

== 2023 ==
=== Non-circulating coins ===
Face value	Coin	Obverse design	Reverse design	Composition	Mintage	Available	Obverse	Reverse
$1	Morgan Dollar	Liberty	Eagle clasping arrows and olive branch	Ag 99.9%	Authorized: TBA Proof: TBA	July 13, 2023		
$1	Peace Dollar	Liberty	A perched bald eagle	Ag 99.9%	Authorized: TBA Proof: TBA	July 13, 2023		

=== Circulating coins ===
Face value	Coin	Obverse design	Reverse design	Mintage	Available	Obverse	Reverse
25¢	Bessie Coleman American Women quarter	George Washington	Bessie Coleman		February 4, 2023		
25¢	Edith Kanakaʻole American Women quarter	George Washington	Edith Kanakaʻole		March 27, 2023		
25¢	Eleanor Roosevelt American Women quarter	George Washington	Eleanor Roosevelt		June 5, 2023		
25¢	Jovita Idar American Women quarter	George Washington	Jovita Idar		August 15, 2023		
25¢	Maria Tallchief American Women quarter	George Washington	Maria Tallchief		October 23, 2023		
$1	Native American dollar	Sacagawea	Maria Tallchief and the Five Moons		February 6, 2023	see article: Sacagawea dollar	
$1	Ohio dollar	Statue of Liberty	Two hands grasped together, the upper arm pulling the lower arm, breaking the chain attached to the shackle on the lower arm				
$1	Louisiana dollar	Statue of Liberty	A Higgins boat with its landing ramp open on a beach				
$1	Indiana dollar	Statue of Liberty	An early gas automobile, a classic car, and a modern Indy-style race car				
$1	Mississippi dollar	Statue of Liberty	A pair of human lungs with a pair of forceps passed from one hand to another				

== 2024 ==
=== Non-circulating coins ===
Face value	Coin	Obverse design	Reverse design	Composition	Mintage	Available	Obverse	Reverse
50¢	Harriet Tubman half dollar	Harriet Tubman with two American Civil War-era boats in the background, representing the Combahee River Raid	Harriet Tubman holding a spyglass in front of a row of Civil War-era tents, symbolizing her work as a scout and spy for the Union Army during the Civil War	Cu: 92% Ni: 8%				
$1	Harriet Tubman dollar	Harriet Tubman	Silhouettes crossing a bridge created by a pair of clasped hands. In the sky, the Big Dipper constellation points to the North Star, which forms the “O” in the word “OF” in “UNITED STATES OF AMERICA”.	Ag 99.9%				
$5	Harriet Tubman five dollar	Harriet Tubman in her years following the Civil War	Arms clasping	Au 90%, Ag 6%, Cu 4%				
50¢	Greatest Generation half dollar			Cu: 92% Ni: 8%				
$1	Greatest Generation dollar			Ag 99.9%				
$5	Greatest Generation half eagle			Au 90%, Ag 6%, Cu 4%				
$1	Morgan Dollar	Liberty	Eagle clasping arrows and olive branch	Ag 99.9%		Summer 2024		
$1	Peace Dollar	Liberty	A perched bald eagle	Ag 99.9%		Summer 2024		
$1	230th Anniversary Flowing Hair Gold Coin	Flowing Hair Liberty	Eagle surrounded by wreath	Au		Fall 2024		

=== Circulating coins ===
Face value	Coin	Obverse design	Reverse design	Mintage	Available	Obverse	Reverse
25¢	Pauli Murray American Women quarter	George Washington	Pauli Murray				
25¢	Patsy Mink American Women quarter	George Washington	Patsy Mink				
25¢	Celia Cruz American Women quarter	George Washington	Celia Cruz				
25¢	Mary Edwards Walker American Women quarter	George Washington	Mary Edwards Walker				
25¢	Zitkala-Ša American Women quarter	George Washington	Zitkala-Ša				
$1	Native American dollar	Sacagawea	Eagle staff together with an American flag, celebrating the Indian Citizenship Act of 1924			see article: Sacagawea dollar	
$1	Illinois dollar	Statue of Liberty					
$1	Alabama dollar	Statue of Liberty					
$1	Maine dollar	Statue of Liberty					
$1	Missouri dollar	Statue of Liberty					

== 2025 ==
=== Non-circulating coins ===
Face value	Coin	Obverse design	Reverse design	Composition	Mintage	Available	Obverse	Reverse
50¢	250th Anniversary of the United States Marine Corps half dollar			Cu: 92% Ni: 8%		January 2, 2025		
$1	250th Anniversary of the United States Marine Corps dollar			Ag 99.9%		January 2, 2025		
$5	250th Anniversary of the United States Marine Corps half eagle			Au		January 2, 2025		
$1	Morgan Dollar	Liberty	Eagle clasping arrows and olive branch	Ag 99.9%		July 10, 2025		
$1	Peace Dollar	Liberty	A perched bald eagle	Ag 99.9%		July 10, 2025		
$50	Comic Art Superman	Superman		Au		July 24, 2025		
$50	Comic Art Batman	Batman		Au		September 25, 2025		
$50	Comic Art Wonder Woman	Wonder Woman		Au		November 13, 2025		

=== Circulating coins ===
Face value	Coin	Obverse design	Reverse design	Mintage	Available	Obverse	Reverse
25¢	Ida B. Wells American Women quarter	George Washington	Ida B. Wells				
25¢	Juliette Gordon Low American Women quarter	George Washington	Juliette Gordon Low				
25¢	Vera Rubin American Women quarter	George Washington	Vera Rubin				
25¢	Stacey Park Milbern American Women quarter	George Washington	Stacey Park Milbern				
25¢	Althea Gibson American Women quarter	George Washington	Althea Gibson				
$1	Native American dollar	Sacagawea	Eagle staff together with an American flag, celebrating the Indian Citizenship Act of 1924			see article: Sacagawea dollar	
$1	Arkansas dollar	Statue of Liberty					
$1	Michigan dollar	Statue of Liberty					
$1	Florida dollar	Statue of Liberty					
$1	Texas dollar	Statue of Liberty					

== 2026 ==
=== Non-circulating coins ===
Face value	Coin	Obverse design	Reverse design	Composition	Mintage	Available	Obverse	Reverse
50¢	FIFA World Cup half dollar		Lifting the FIFA World Cup Trophy	Cu: 92% Ni: 8%				
$1	FIFA World Cup dollar		Lifting the FIFA World Cup Trophy	Ag 99.9%				
$5	FIFA World Cup half eagle		Lifting the FIFA World Cup Trophy	Au				
$1	Morgan Dollar	Liberty	Eagle clasping arrows and olive branch	Ag 99.9%		July 9, 2025		
$1	Peace Dollar	Liberty	A perched bald eagle	Ag 99.9%		July 9, 2025		
$50	Comic Art Green Lantern	Green Lantern		Au				
$50	Comic Art Robin	Robin		Au				
$50	Comic Art Supergirl	Supergirl		Au				
$250	President Donald J. Trump	President Donald J. Trump	Great Seal of the United States	Au: 99.99%				
