= Christa McAuliffe silver dollar =

Commemorative United States coin

Christa McAuliffe Commemorative dollar
- United States
- Value: $1
- Mass: 26.730 g (0.859 troy oz)
- Thickness: 38.1 mm (1.500 in)
- Years of minting: 2021

Obverse
- Design: Profile of Christa McAuliffe
- Designer: Laurie Musser

Reverse
- Design: McAuliffe and students
- Designer: Emily Damstra

The Christa McAuliffe silver dollar is a commemorative coin which was issued by the United States Mint in 2021.

== Legislation ==
The Christa McAuliffe Commemorative Coin Act of 2019 (Pub. L. 116–65 (text) (PDF)) authorized the production of a commemorative silver dollar to commemorate the life of Christa McAuliffe, a former social studies teacher who in 1985, was chosen to be the first participant in the National Aeronautics and Space Administration’s Teacher in Space program. On January 28, 1986, McAuliffe and six astronauts were tragically killed when Space Shuttle Challenger exploded after launch. The act allowed the coins to be struck in both proof and uncirculated finishes. The coin was first released on January 28, 2021, the 35th anniversary of the disaster.

== Design ==
The obverse of the Christa McAuliffe commemorative dollar, designed by Laurie J. Musser and sculpted by Phebe Hemphill, depicts a portrait of Christa McAuliffe with a hopeful gaze. The reverse, designed by Emily Damstra and sculpted by Joseph Menna, depicts McAuliffe as a teacher, smiling as she points forward and upward, symbolizing the future while three high school-age students look on with wonder. Seven stars above them pay tribute to those who perished in the Challenger tragedy. The logo of the FIRST (For Inspiration and Recognition of Science and Technology) organization is also included.

== See also ==
- United States commemorative coins
- List of United States commemorative coins and medals (2020s)
