= Harriet Tubman commemorative coins =

The Harriet Tubman Commemorative Coins were issued by the United States Mint in 2024 to celebrate the bicentennial of Harriet Tubman's birth. Three coins were issued: a clad half dollar coin, a silver dollar coin, and a five dollar gold coin.

The clad half dollar coin illustrates her work during the American Civil War as a scout, spy, and nurse for the Union Army. The obverse depicts Harriet Tubman with two boats representing the Raid on Combahee Ferry where Tubman led an expedition of 150 African American soldiers of the 2nd South Carolina Infantry. More than 750 slaves were rescued and freed. The reverse shows Tubman with a spyglass in front of Civil War-era tents, recognizing her work as a scout and spy. These coins were produced at the San Francisco Mint.

The $1 silver coin recognizes Tubman's work as a conductor on the Underground Railroad. The obverse depicts her offering her hand. The reverse shows silhouettes crossing a bridge formed from clasped hands under the Big Dipper. The coin is 99.9% silver and 0.859 troy ounces. These coins were produced at the Philadelphia Mint.

The $5 gold coin reflects her life and work after the civil war. The obverse shows Tubman in her later years. The reverse shows clasping arms and inscriptions of her seven core values: faith, freedom, family, community, self-determination, social justice, equality. The coin weighs 0.243 troy ounces and is 90% gold, 6% silver, and 4% copper. These coins were produced at the West Point Mint.

Face value	Coin	Obverse design	Reverse design	Mintage	Obverse	Reverse
50¢	Harriet Tubman Clad Half Dollar	Tubman with two boats representing the Raid on Combahee Ferry. Don Everhart, Designer; Renata Gordon, Sculptor.	Tubman as scout and spy. Thomas Hipschen, Designer; John McGraw, Sculptor.	750,000 authorized maximum		
$1	Harriet Tubman Silver Dollar	Tubman with outstretched hand. Beth Zaiken, Designer; Phebe Hemphill, Sculptor.	Silhouettes crossing a bridge formed from clasped hands under the Big Dipper. Beth Zaiken, Designer; Craig Campbell, Sculptor.	400,000 authorized maximum		
$5	Harriet Tubman Five Dollar Gold	Tubman in her later years. Chris Costello, Designer; Joseph Menna, Sculptor.	Clasping arms and inscriptions of her seven core values. Benjamin Sowards, Designer; Eric David Custer, Sculptor.	50,000 authorized maximum		

== See also ==
- List of United States commemorative coins and medals (2020s)
- United States commemorative coins
