= Women's Suffrage Centennial silver dollar =

Women's Suffrage Centennial Commemorative dollar
- United States
- Value: $1
- Mass: 26.730 g (0.859 troy oz)
- Diameter: 38.1 mm (1.500 in)
- Edge: Reeded
- Composition: 99.9% Ag
- Years of minting: 2020

Obverse
- Design: Profiles of three women
- Designer: Christina Hess

Reverse
- Design: "2020" being dropped into a ballot box
- Designer: Christina Hess

The Women's Suffrage Centennial silver dollar is a commemorative coin which was issued by the United States Mint in 2020.

== Legislation ==
The Women's Suffrage Centennial Coin Act (Pub. L. 116–71 (text) (PDF)) authorized the production of a commemorative silver dollar to celebrate the 100th anniversary of the ratification of the 19th Amendment to the U.S. Constitution, which granted women the right to vote. The act allowed the coins to be struck in both proof and uncirculated finishes. The coin was first released on August 18, 2020, the 100th anniversary of the ratification of the amendment.

== Design ==
The obverse of the Women's Suffrage Centennial commemorative dollar, designed by Christina Hess and sculpted by Phebe Hemphill, features overlapping profiles of three distinct women. Each woman is wearing a different type of hat to symbolize the many decades the suffrage movement spanned. The figure in the foreground is wearing a cloche hat with an art deco pattern and a button with the year of the 19th Amendment's ratification. The reverse, also designed and sculpted by Hess and Hemphill, respectively, shows “2020” being dropped into a ballot box, styled with art deco elements to indicate the artistic style of the era. The caption “VOTES FOR WOMEN” is inscribed inside a circle on the front of the box.

== See also ==
- United States commemorative coins
- List of United States commemorative coins and medals (2020s)
