= Public Law 113–10 =

2013 United States federal law

- Long title: To specify the size of the precious-metal blanks that will be used in the production of the National Baseball Hall of Fame commemorative coins.
- Announced in: the 113th United States Congress
- Sponsored by: Rep. Richard L. Hanna (R, NY-22)
- Number of co-sponsors: 2

Codification
- Acts affected: National Baseball Hall of Fame Commemorative Coin Act

Legislative history
- Introduced in the House as H.R. 1071 by Rep. Richard L. Hanna (R-NY) on March 12, 2013; Committee consideration by United States House Committee on Financial Services; Passed the House on April 24, 2013 (Voice vote); Passed the Senate on May 7, 2013 (Unanimous consent); Signed into law by President Barack Obama on May 17, 2013

The bill entitled To specify the size of the precious-metal blanks that will be used in the production of the National Baseball Hall of Fame commemorative coins (Pub. L. 113–10 (text) (PDF), H.R. 1071) became a law on May 17, 2013 during the 113th United States Congress. It was first introduced in the United States House of Representatives on March 12, 2013 by Rep. Richard L. Hanna (R-NY). The bill corrects a technical problem in a previous law dealing with the National Baseball Hall of Fame commemorative coins.

== Background ==
According to a summary by the House Republicans, the bill was merely to correct a technical error made in the National Baseball Hall of Fame Commemorative Coin Act.

== Provisions/Elements of the bill ==
This summary is based largely on the summary provided by the Congressional Research Service, a public domain source.

The new law amends the National Baseball Hall of Fame Commemorative Coin Act (Pub. L. 112–152 (text) (PDF), H.R. 2527) to modify the requirements for the production of gold and silver coins commemorating the National Baseball Hall of Fame to require such coins to be struck on planchets of specified diameters.

== Procedural history ==
=== House ===
The bill was first introduced in the United States House of Representatives on March 12, 2013, by Rep. Richard L. Hanna (R-NY). It was referred to the United States House Committee on Financial Services. On April 24, 2013, it passed by a simple voice vote.

=== Senate ===
The bill was received in the United States Senate on April 25, 2013. On May 7, 2013, the bill passed the Senate by Unanimous consent.

=== President ===
The bill was presented to President of the United States Barack Obama on May 9, 2013. It was signed into law by him on May 17, 2013.

== See also ==
- List of bills in the 113th United States Congress
- National Baseball Hall of Fame and Museum
- Planchet
