= Apollo 11 anniversaries =

Anniversaries of the first human moon landing

Apollo 11 anniversary
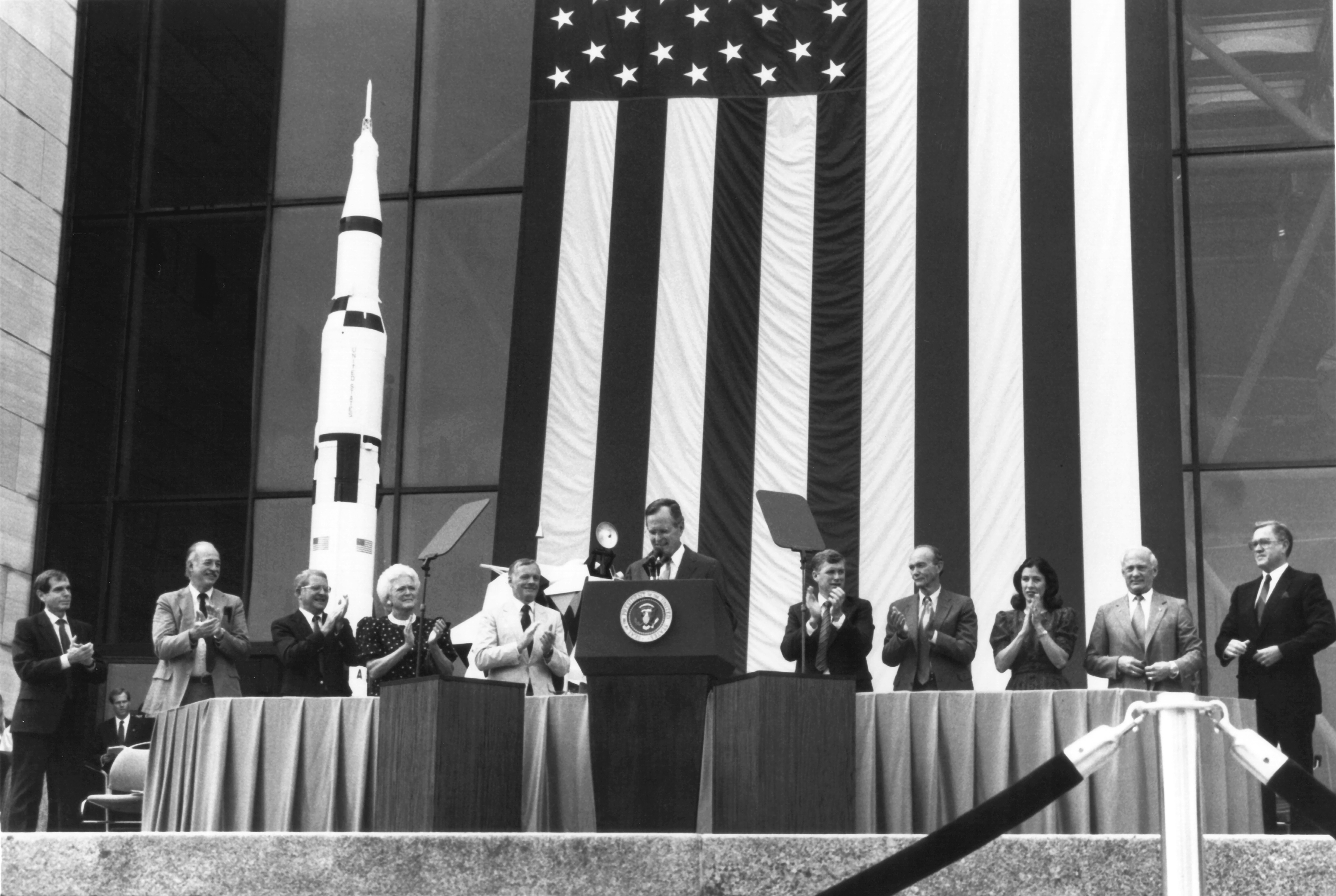
- President George H.W. Bush and the Apollo 11 astronauts
- Status: Active
- Genre: anniversary
- Begins: July 16
- Ends: July 20
- Frequency: Quinquennially
- Country: United States
- Years active: 52
- Inaugurated: July 16, 1974
- Founder: NASA

Apollo 11 was the first human spaceflight to land on the Moon. In the decades after its 1969 mission took place, widespread celebrations have been held to celebrate its anniversaries.

== 10th anniversary ==
The Apollo 11 crew, Buzz Aldrin, Neil Armstrong, and Michael Collins, who had not appeared publicly since the 5th anniversary, participated in ceremonies in Washington, D.C., on July 20, 1979.

== 15th anniversary ==
A model rocket launch, closed to the public due to the explosives involved, occurred at Kennedy Space Center in 1984.

== 20th anniversary ==
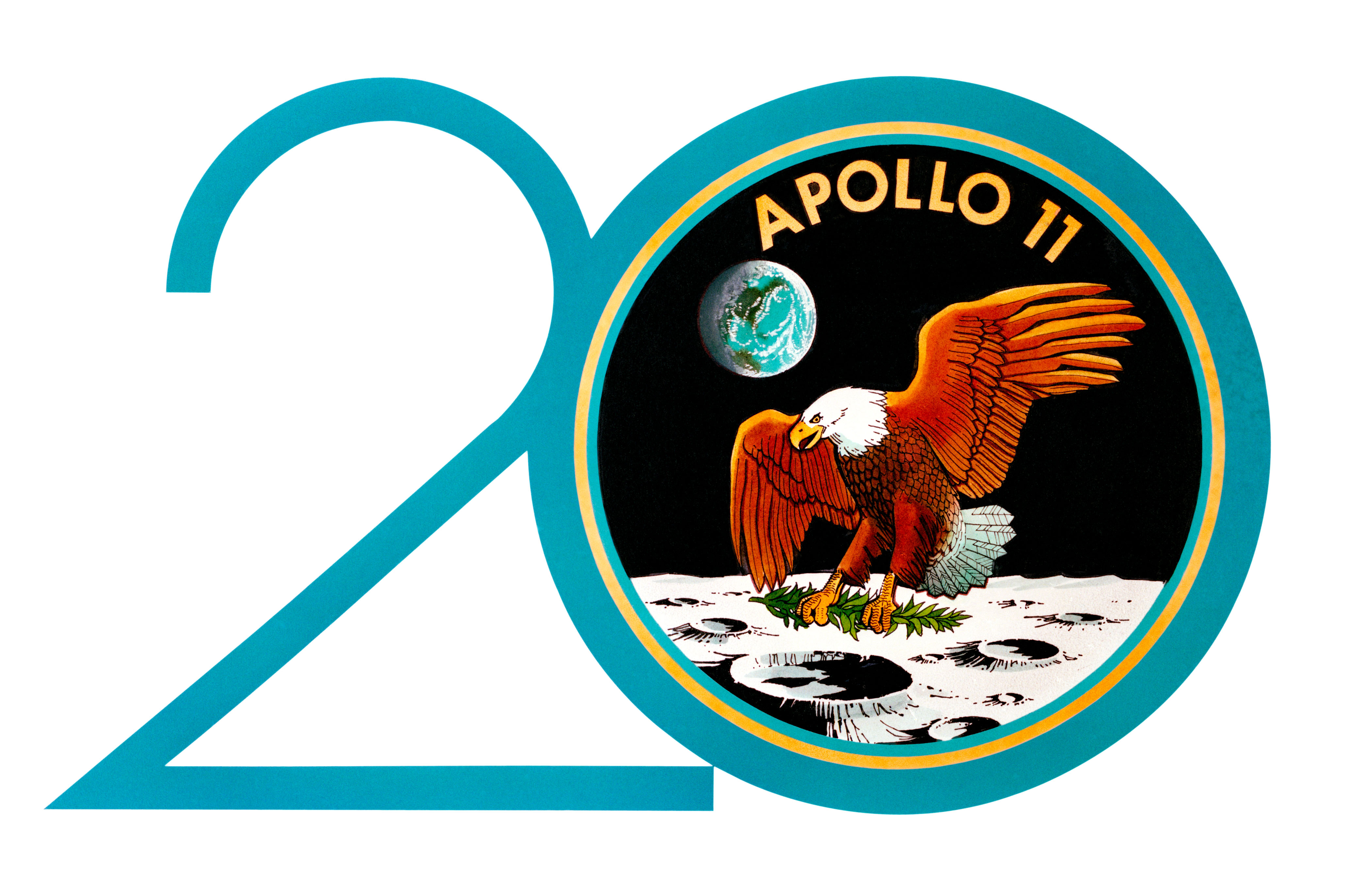
20th anniversary logo

On the 20th anniversary in 1989, President George H. W. Bush announced plans to return to the Moon and then to Mars, known as the Space Exploration Initiative (SEI).

The USPS released a stamp designed by Chris Calle, son of Paul Calle, the artist that designed the Apollo 11 stamp issued in 1969. The $2.40 priority mail stamp depicts two astronauts planting a flag on the Moon. Living people cannot be featured on US stamps, but the faces of the astronauts are obscured by their visors. It was released July 20 at the Smithsonian Air and Space Museum in Washington, D.C.

== 25th anniversary ==
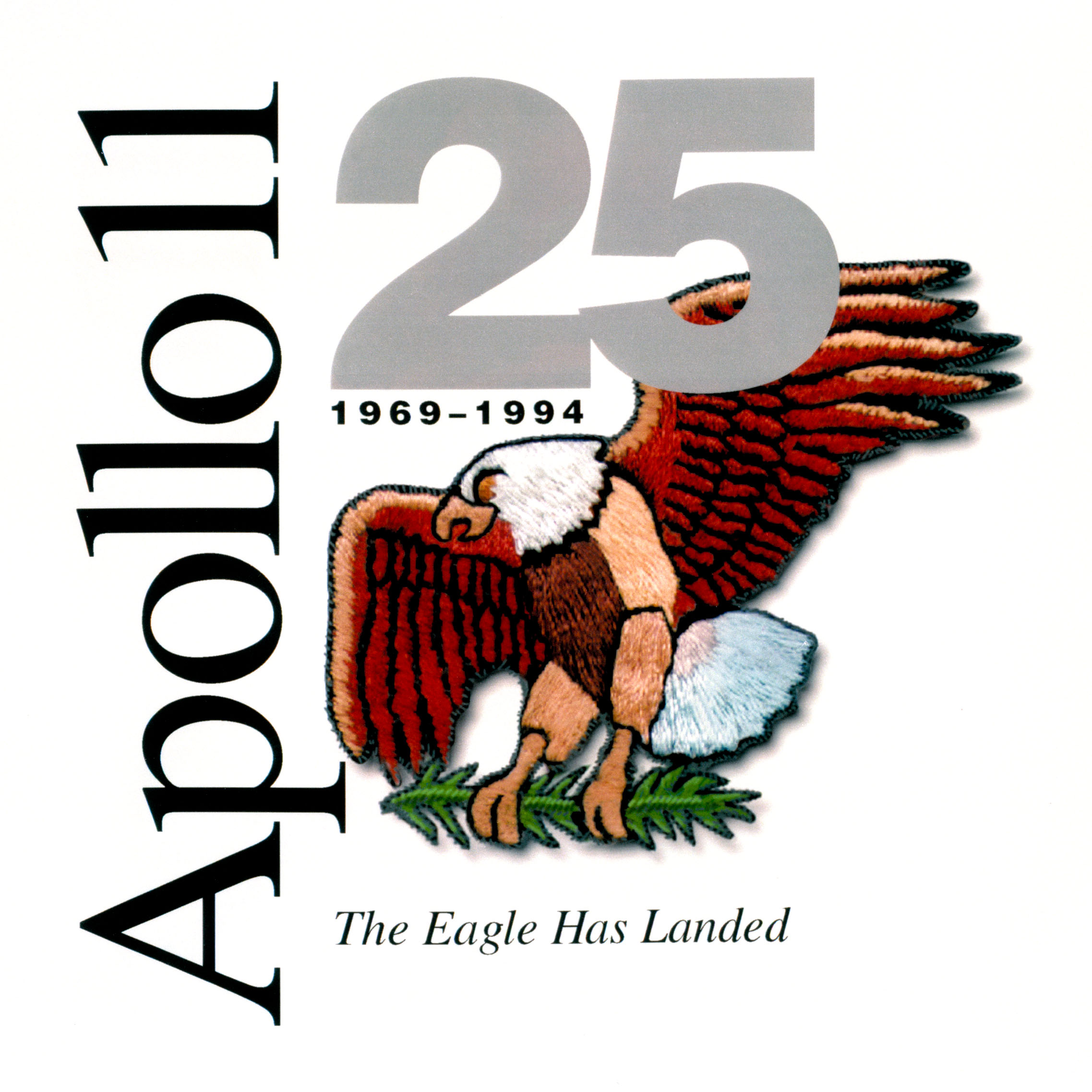
25th anniversary logo

On July 16, 1994, NASA held a replay of the countdown and launched scale models of the Saturn rocket. The Apollo 11 astronauts declined to attend. They had attended the event five years prior.

The United States Postal Service (USPS) issued two stamps, a 29 cent vertical stamp and a $9.95 express mail stamp, to commemorate the anniversary. The 29 cent stamp depicts an astronaut saluting a flag on the Moon; the express mail stamp shows a zoomed-out version of the same scene. They were designed by Paul and Chris Calle. The stamp design was unveiled July 20 by Aldrin in Washington.

The Apollo 11 crew accepted an invitation to the White House on July 21 to celebrate the event. President Bill Clinton, Vice President Al Gore, First Lady Hillary Clinton, and other members of Apollo flight crews were among the attendees.

PBS released a documentary, Apollo 13: To the Edge and Back.

== 30th anniversary ==
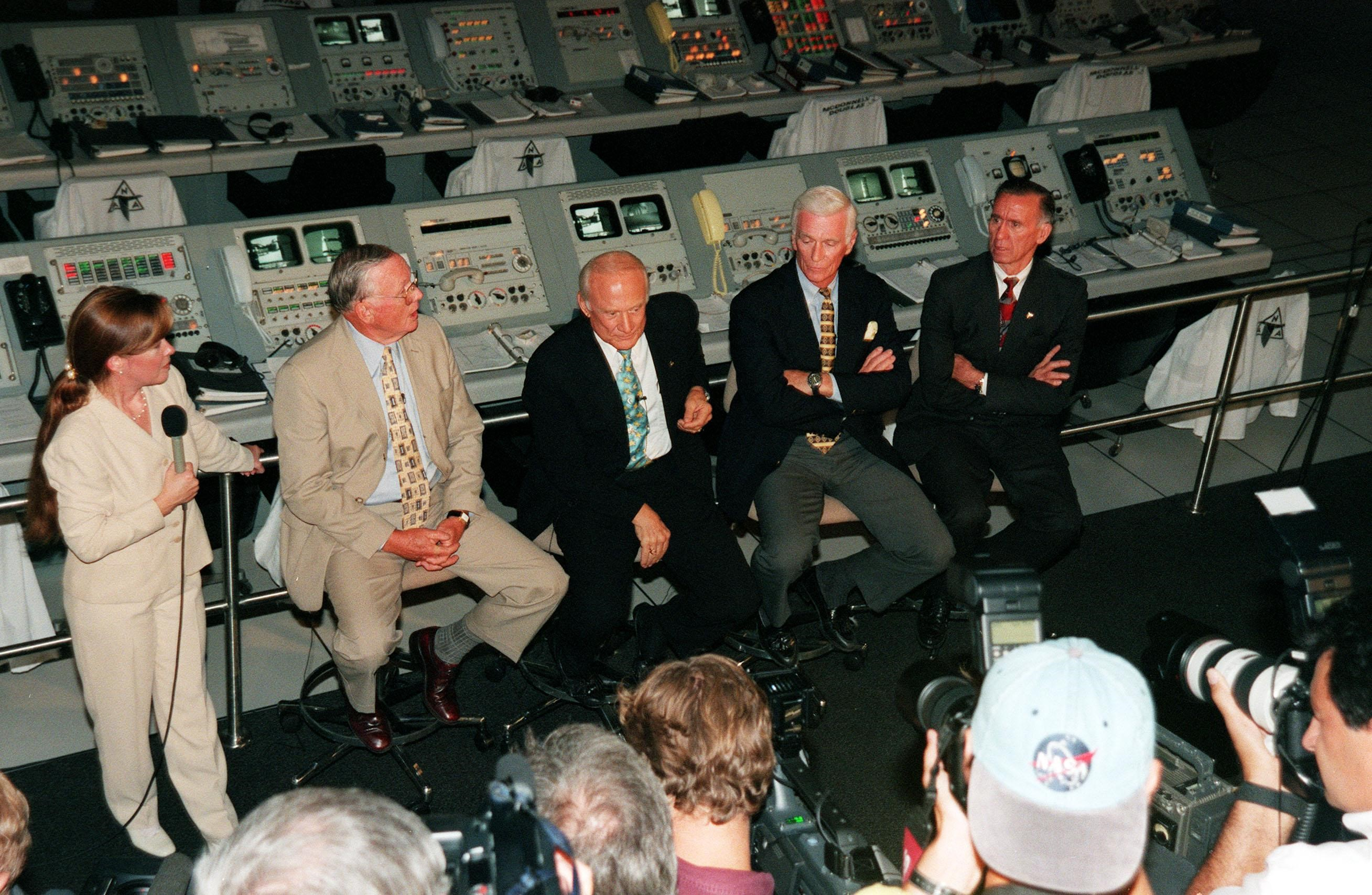
Aldrin and Armstrong at a press conference in Mission Control for the anniversary

On the 30th anniversary in 1999, Vice-President Al Gore awarded the astronauts with the Langley Gold Medal for aviation. This was the twenty-second time the award had been given out. The ceremony was held at the National Air and Space Museum. On receiving the medal, Armstrong said, "We the Apollo 11 crew are enormously appreciative of being asked to receive this Langley Medal and we do so on behalf of all the men and women of the Apollo program."

Armstrong attended a banquet at Kennedy Space Center but declined to sign autographs or make a speech. Aldrin attended the event as well; Collins declined, as he was retired. Aldrin held a public briefing on July 17 at the center.

The USPS issued a 33-cent stamp as part of a series of stamps that commemorated events that occurred in the 1960s. The stamp, named "Man Walks on Moon", is Scott catalogue number 3188e, and depicts Aldrin's lunar bootprint. It was unveiled at Kennedy Space Center on July 17.

Ground was broke at Kennedy Space Center for the Apollo Exhibit located in the U.S. Space Walk of Fame.

The National Air and Space Museum added two new exhibits: Armstrong and Aldrin's helmet and gloves, and the ability to operate a camera inside of the lunar module, allowing visitors to see inside the cockpit for the first time.

On July 21, Aldrin was a keynote speaker at the unveiling of a Moon rock at the base of the Tribune Tower in Chicago, Illinois. This marked the first time NASA loaned a lunar sample to a private corporation rather than a school, museum, or planetarium. The rock was removed in 2011 due to an outdated display. A new rock display is planned but has not been installed as of 2018.

The USS Hornet held a ten-day event called Moonfest 1999 at the museum. The event included NASA exhibits and evening astronomy. Aldrin, along with Carl Seilberlich, captain of the Hornet during recovery operations, attended the event on the 24th, the anniversary of the day of the recovery. 17,000 visitors attended the event.

== 40th anniversary ==
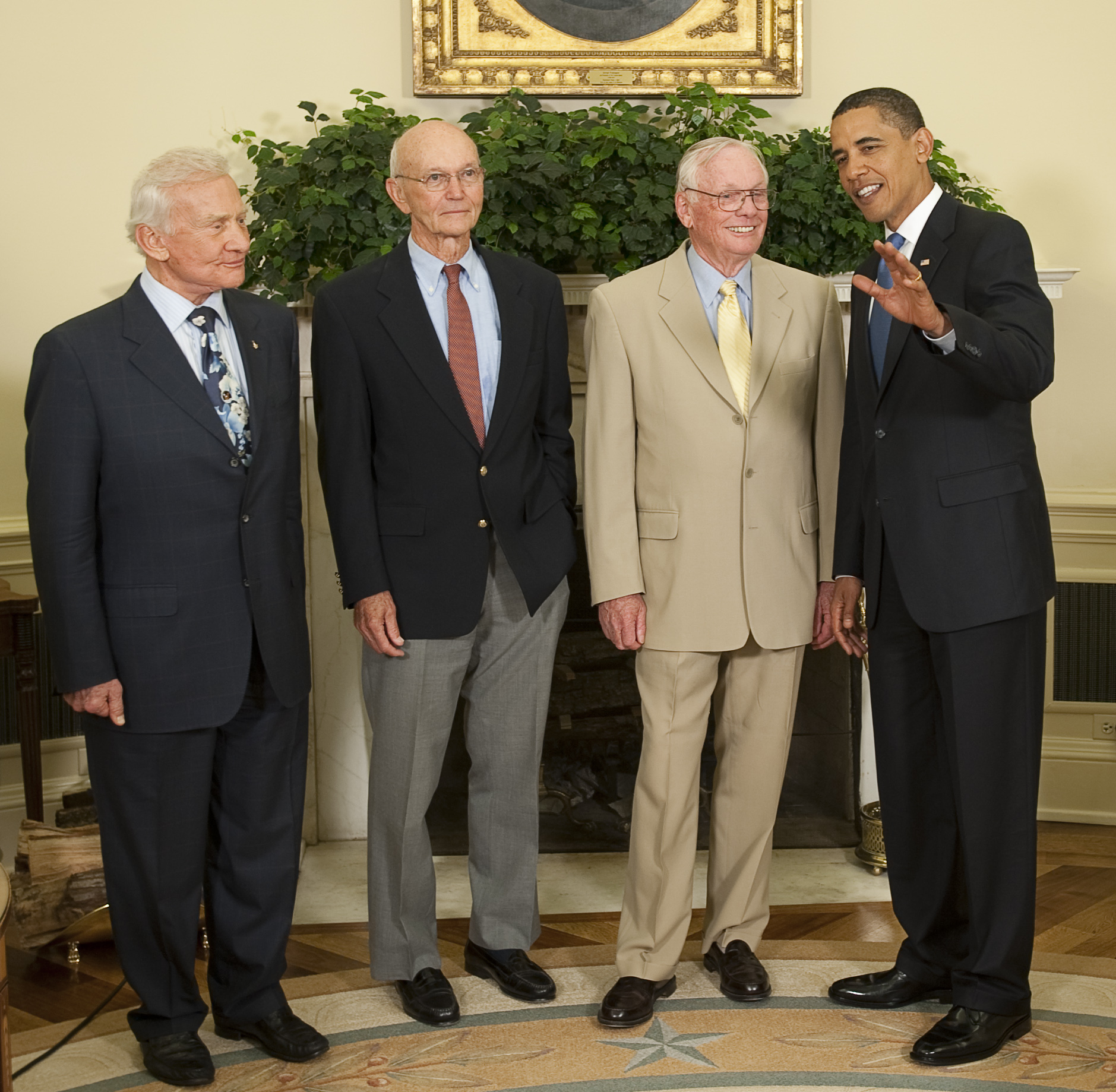
President Obama meets with crew of Apollo 11

On July 15, 2009, Life.com released a photo gallery of previously unpublished photos of the astronauts taken by Life photographer Ralph Morse prior to the Apollo 11 launch. From July 16 to 24, 2009, NASA streamed the original mission audio on its website in real time 40 years to the minute after the events occurred. In addition, it is in the process of restoring the video footage and has released a preview of key moments. In July 2010, air-to-ground voice recordings and film footage shot in Mission Control during the Apollo 11 powered descent and landing was re-synchronized and released for the first time. The John F. Kennedy Presidential Library and Museum set up an Adobe Flash website that rebroadcasts the transmissions of Apollo 11 from launch to landing on the Moon. On July 20, 2009, Armstrong, Aldrin, and Collins met with U.S. President Barack Obama at the White House. "We expect that there is, as we speak, another generation of kids out there who are looking up at the sky and are going to be the next Armstrong, Collins, and Aldrin", Obama said. "We want to make sure that NASA is going to be there for them when they want to take their journey." On August 7, 2009, an act of Congress awarded the three astronauts a Congressional Gold Medal, the highest civilian award in the United States. The bill was sponsored by Florida Senator Bill Nelson and Florida Representative Alan Grayson.

A group of British scientists interviewed as part of the anniversary events reflected on the significance of the Moon landing:

It was carried out in a technically brilliant way with risks taken ... that would be inconceivable in the risk-averse world of today ... The Apollo programme is arguably the greatest technical achievement of mankind to date ... nothing since Apollo has come close [to] the excitement that was generated by those astronauts – Armstrong, Aldrin and the 10 others who followed them.

== 45th anniversary ==
On July 21, 2014, the Kennedy Space Center Operations and Checkout building was renamed for Armstrong. Aldrin and Collins attended the ceremony.

== 50th anniversary ==
On June 10, 2015, Congressman Bill Posey introduced resolution H.R. 2726 to the 114th session of the United States House of Representatives directing the United States Mint to design and sell commemorative coins in gold, silver and clad for the 50th anniversary of the Apollo 11 mission. On January 24, 2019, the Mint released the Apollo 11 50th Anniversary commemorative coins to the public on its website.

The USPS created two forever stamps to commemorate the 50th anniversary of the mission. The stamps were designed by Antonio Alcalá. One stamp features the famous image that Armstrong took of Aldrin, with Armstrong visible in Aldrin's faceplate's reflection. The other stamp shows an image of the Moon, taken by Gregory H. Revera, with the Apollo 11 landing site highlighted. The stamps were unveiled at Kennedy Space Center on July 19. Apollo 9 astronaut Rusty Schweickart was among the celebrities present.

The Smithsonian Institute's National Air and Space Museum and NASA sponsored the “Apollo 50 Festival” on the National Mall in Washington DC. The three day (July 18 to 20, 2019) outdoor festival featured hands-on exhibits and activities, live performances, and speakers such as Adam Savage and NASA scientists.

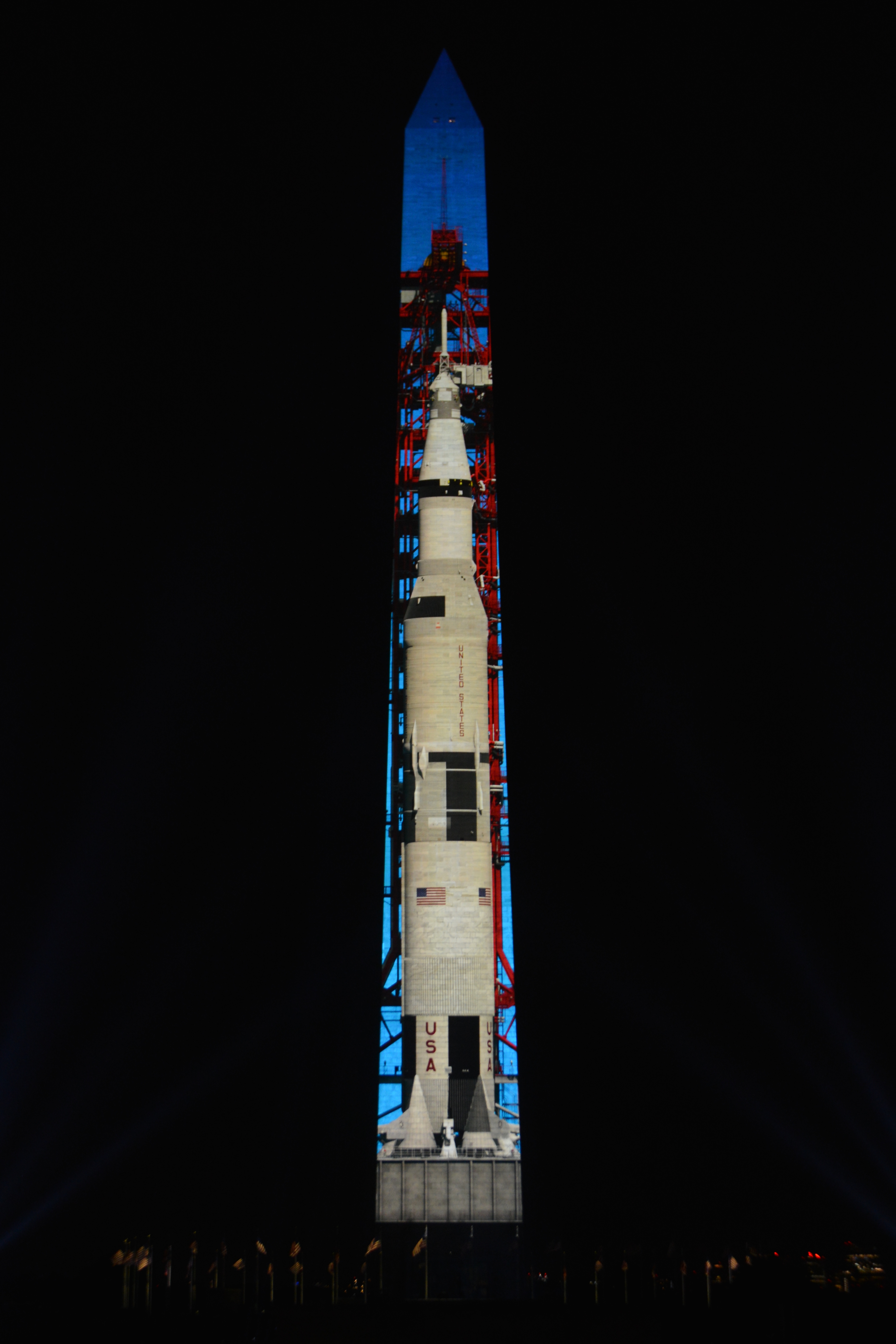
A photo taken during the Apollo 11 50th anniversary show of the Apollo 11 rocket projected on the Washington Monument in Washington, DC on July 20, 2019

As part of the festival was a projection of the 363-foot (111 m) tall Saturn V rocket on the east face of the 555-foot (169 m) tall Washington Monument from July 16 through the 20th from 9:30 pm until 11:30 pm (EDT). There was also a 17-minute show that combined full-motion video projected on the Washington Monument to recreate the assembly and launch of the Saturn V rocket. The projection was combined with a 40-foot (12 m) wide recreation of the Kennedy Space Center countdown clock and two large video screens showing archival footage to recreate the time leading up to the Moon landing. The shows were at 9:30 pm, 10:30 pm, and 11:30 pm on Friday, July 19, and Saturday, July 20, with the 10:30 pm show on Saturday delayed slightly so the portion of the show where Neil Armstrong first set foot on the Moon would happen exactly 50 years to the second after the actual event (10:56:15 EDT).

A documentary film, Apollo 11, with restored footage of the 1969 event, premiered in IMAX on March 1, 2019, and broadly in theaters on March 8.

On July 19, 2019, the Google Doodle paid tribute to the Apollo 11 Moon Landing, complete with a link to an animated YouTube video with voiceover by astronaut Michael Collins.

Buzz Aldrin, Michael Collins, Rick Armstrong (Neil's son), Mark Armstrong (Rick's son), and others were hosted by President Donald Trump in the Oval Office. Trump had also honored Aldrin, Gene Kranz, and the Apollo 11 mission in the 2019 State of the Union Address and the 2019 Salute to America event at the National Mall.

== See also ==
- Apollo 11 in popular culture
