= American Legion Centennial commemorative coins =

US commemorative coins issued in 2019

The American Legion Centennial commemorative coins were a series of commemorative coins issued by the United States Mint in 2019 to commemorate the centennial of the American Legion.

== Legislation ==
The bill H.R. 2519, titled "The American Legion 100th Anniversary Commemorative Coin Act", was introduced to the House of Representatives by Representative Timothy Walz of Minnesota on May 18, 2017. A companion bill, S. 1182, was introduced in the Senate by Representative Todd Young of Indiana. It passed the House on September 25, then passed the Senate on September 28. The bill was signed into law (Pub. L. 115–65 (text) (PDF)) by President Donald Trump on October 6, 2017. The legislation authorized the United States Mint to strike half dollars, dollars, and half eagles to commemorate the 100th anniversary of the American Legion, a veterans organization founded in Paris in 1919 by members of the American Expeditionary Forces following World War I. 50,000 gold half eagles, 400,000 silver dollars, and 750,000 clad half dollars were authorized to be struck.

== Designs ==
The American Legion emblem is featured on all three coins

Candidate designs were created by Mint engravers and artists from the Artistic Infusion Program (AIP). The Citizens Coinage Advisory Committee (CCAC) reviewed the designs at their March 13, 2018 meeting, with representatives from the American Legion in attendance. The committee was unhappy with the designs, with senior member Donald Scarinci calling them "artistically the worst designs I have seen here in five years". The CCAC would eventually recommend six designs for the coins chosen by a representative from the Legion, at the suggestion of Scarinci.

The Commission of Fine Arts (CFA) recommended designs on March 15 after about 10 minutes of deliberation. The CFA recommended a different design for the reverse of the half eagle after the urging of Legion representatives. The previous design, which had been recommended by the CCAC, depicted a folded US flag. The final designs were approved by Treasury Secretary Steven Mnuchin and unveiled at the Legion's 100th national convention in Minneapolis on August 29.

=== Half dollar ===
The half dollar was designed by AIP artist Richard Masters. The obverse, sculpted by Mint sculptor-engraver Phebe Hemphill, depicts two children reciting the Pledge of Allegiance, with the phrase "I pledge allegiance to the flag..." and one of the children wearing an American Legion hat. The reverse, sculpted by Mint sculptor-engraver Joseph Menna, completes the phrase with "...of the United States of America" and depicts the US flag on a flagpole, with the American Legion emblem above.

=== Dollar ===
The obverse of the dollar, designed by AIP artist Paul C. Balan and sculpted by Mint sculptor-engraver Renata Gordon, depicts the American Legion emblem adored by oak leaves and a lily. The reverse, designed by AIP artist Patricia Lucas-Morris and sculpted by Mint sculptor-engraver Michael Gaudioso, depicts crossed US and American legion flags with a fleur-de-lis above. An inscription reads 100 YEARS OF SERVICE

=== Half eagle ===
The obverse of the half eagle was designed by AIP artist Chris Costello and sculpted by Hemphill. The obverse features an geometric rim design from the Legion emblem and depicts the Eiffel Tower and a V, as in V for Victory. The reverse, designed by Balan and sculpted by Menna, depicts a soaring bald eagle and the American Legion emblem.

== Production ==
The half dollar was struck in copper-nickel clad, the dollar was struck in .999 fine silver, and the half eagle was struck in .900 fine gold. The coins were struck both in proof and uncirculated finishes. The gold half eagles were struck at the West Point Mint. The silver dollars were struck at the Philadelphia Mint. The proof half dollar was struck at the San Francisco Mint and the uncirculated half dollar was struck at the Denver Mint.

== Release and reception ==
The Mint began accepting orders for the coins on its website on March 14, 2019. Both proof and uncirculated coins were sold individually, and a 3-coin proof set was offered. Surcharges from sales of the coins were paid to American Legion. Another set including a proof silver dollar and a silver medal was released on May 20.

American Legion Centennial commemorative coin sales (as of December 2019)
Sales option	Pre-issue price	Mint and mint mark	Authorized mintage	Total sales	Notes
$5 proof	$418.75	West Point (W)	50,000	10,916	Prices changed weekly due to market fluctuations
$5 uncirculated	$408.75	West Point (W)	50,000	2,929	Prices changed weekly due to market fluctuations
$1 proof	$54.95	Philadelphia (P)	400,000	63,100	Includes 9,888 sold with medal set
$1 uncirculated	$51.95	Philadelphia (P)	400,000	13,790	
$.50 proof	$27.95	San Francisco (S)	750,000	27,286	
$.50 uncirculated	$25.95	Denver (D)	750,000	11,429	

== See also ==
- United States commemorative coins
- List of United States commemorative coins and medals (2010s)
