= Basketball Hall of Fame commemorative coins =

Series of United States commemorative coins

The Basketball Hall of Fame commemorative coins are a series of domed-shaped coins issued by the United States Mint in 2020. The coins were authorized by Public Law 115–343 to commemorate the 60th anniversary of the Naismith Memorial Basketball Hall of Fame.

== History ==
Following the success of the National Baseball Hall of Fame commemorative coins of 2014, H.R.4592 was introduced to the House of Representatives in 2016. It proposed the production of a series of coins commemorating the 60th anniversary of the Basketball Hall of Fame in 2019. However, it did not make it past the House.

The production of Basketball Hall of Fame coins was proposed again in 2017 with H.R.1235, this time with production scheduled for 2020. Unlike the previous proposal, H.R.1235 passed the House and the Senate, and was signed into law by President Donald Trump on December 21, 2018, becoming Public Law 115–343.

== Legislation ==
Public Law 115–343 calls for a maximum mintage limit of 750,000 clad half dollars, 400,000 silver dollars, and 50,000 gold half eagles. It also calls for the coins to be dome-shaped and for the reverse to feature a basketball.

== Designs ==
The US Mint launched the Basketball Hall of Fame Commemorative Coin Design Competition on March 19, 2019, calling for artists to submit obverse designs to the Citizens Coinage Advisory Committee. The chosen designs were unveiled on September 6, 2019.

The obverse, designed by Justin Kunz, features three players reaching for a ball. The reverse, designed by Donna Weaver, features a basketball falling into a net.

Some of the designs not chosen for the Basketball Hall of Fame coins were later submitted to the CCAC for the reverse of the 2020 Massachusetts American Innovation dollar.

=== Colorization ===
On July 17, 2019, April Stafford, the chief of the Office of Design Management, stated that the Mint was considering colorizing the half dollar and silver dollar coins. The Mint confirmed later that year that those coins would be colorized, becoming the first such coins released from the Mint.

The idea of colorized coins brought mixed responses from the numismatic community. One reader of Coin World opined negatively that the Mint would be mimicking the Royal Canadian Mint's "plan of turning out trinkets". However, some welcomed the prospect of coloring.

=== Release and reception ===
The coins were officially released June 4, 2020 at noon Eastern Daylight Time. The clad half dollar and silver dollar coins featured colorized designs, while the gold half eagle did not. The coins received mixed reviews: collectors appreciated the innovative dome shape and colorization, but some traditionalists criticized the departure from classic coin design.

Sales of the coins were strong initially but slowed due to the onset of the COVID-19 pandemic, which affected retail and hobby markets. By the end of the sales period, the Mint reported sales approaching, but not reaching, the maximum authorized mintages for each denomination.
