= Citizens Coinage Advisory Committee =

Federal advisory committee

- Formation: April 23, 2003
- Founder: United States Congress
- Type: Governmental
- Headquarters: 801 9th Street, NW, Washington, D.C.
- Acting Chair: Arthur Bernstein
- Parent organization: United States Department of the Treasury
- Website: ccac.gov

The Citizens Coinage Advisory Committee (CCAC) is a federal advisory committee that was established in 2003 to advise the United States secretary of the treasury on the themes and designs of all US coinage and medals. The CCAC serves as an informed, experienced and impartial resource to the secretary of the treasury and represents the interests of American citizens and collectors.

== Responsibilities ==
Public Law 108-15 authorizes the CCAC to:

- Advise the Secretary of the Treasury on any theme or design proposals relating to circulating coinage, bullion coinage, Congressional Gold Medals, and national and other medals.
- Advise the Secretary of the Treasury with regard to the events, persons, or places to be commemorated by the issuance of commemorative coins in each of the five calendar years succeeding the year in which a commemorative coin designation is made.
- Make recommendations with respect to the mintage level for any commemorative coin recommended.

In certain statutes, such as Public Law 116-330, the CCAC is required to review coin design portfolios prior to the Secretary's selection.

== Membership ==
The CCAC is composed of eleven members, each appointed by the secretary to a term of four years.

Members as of 2026
Name	Current term	Qualification
Peter Van Alfen	2024–2028	Specially qualified as a numismatic curator
Arthur Bernstein	2025–2029	Representative of the general public
Vacant		Recommended by the Speaker of the House
John Saunders	2022–2026	Recommended by the House Minority Leader
Kellen Hoard	2023–2027	Representative of the general public
Christopher Capozzola	2023–2027	Specially qualified in American history
Annelisa Purdie	2024–2028	Representative of the general public
Jeanne Stevens-Sollman	2024–2028	Specially qualified in sculpture or medallic arts
Samuel Gelberd	2024–2028	Specially qualified in numismatics
Donald Scarinci	2024–2028	Person recommended by Senate Majority Leader
Mike Moran	2024–2028	Person recommended by Senate Minority Leader

Past members include Kareem Abdul-Jabbar, Ute Wartenberg, Robert Remini, Bill Fivaz, Thomas Noe, and Susan Kare.

== See also ==
- Citizens' Stamp Advisory Committee
