= United States Army commemorative coins =

2011 US commemorative coin series

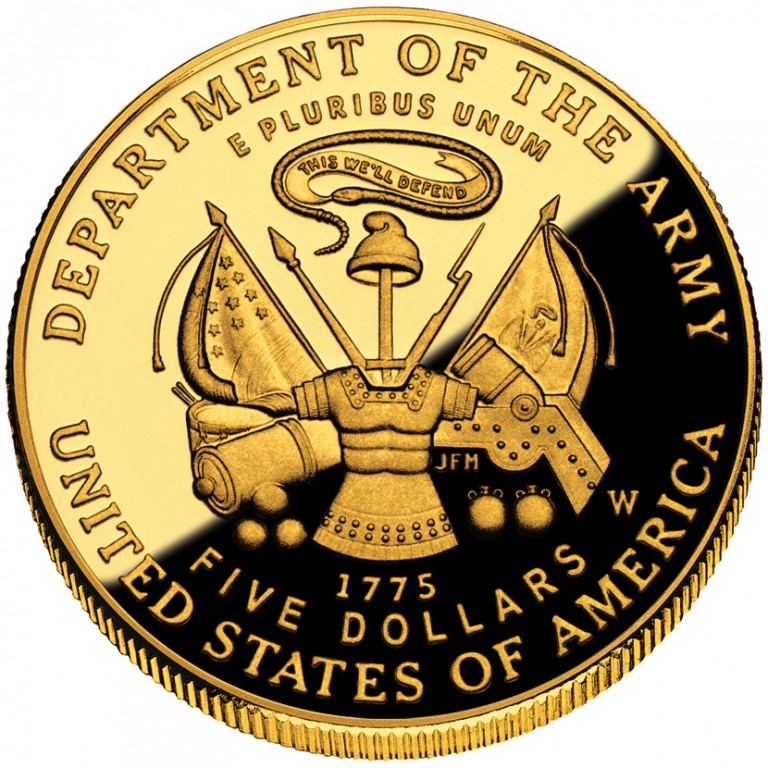
Reverse of the United States Army commemorative half eagle, featuring the Army emblem

The United States Army commemorative coins were a series of commemorative coins issued by the United States Mint in 2011 to honor the United States Army. The coins consisted of uncirculated and proof copper-nickel half dollars, silver dollars, and gold half eagles. Surcharges from sales of the coins went towards the construction of the National Museum of the United States Army.

== Legislation ==
The United States Army Commemorative Coin Act of 2008 (Pub. L. 110–450 (text) (PDF)), enacted December 1, 2008, authorized the United States Mint to strike 750,000 half dollars, 500,000 silver dollars, and 100,000 half eagles to honor the United States Army. The legislation called for the coins to be "emblematic of the traditions, history, and heritage of the U.S. Army and its role in American society from the Colonial period to today".

Surcharges of $5 on the half dollars, $10 on the silver dollars, and $35 on the half eagles went towards the construction of the National Museum of the United States Army.

== Designs ==
The designs were approved by Secretary of the Treasury Timothy F. Geithner and unveiled during the 111th Army–Navy Game at Lincoln Financial Field in Philadelphia on December 11, 2010.

=== Half dollar ===
The obverse of the half dollar was designed by Artistic Infusion Program (AIP) artist Donna Weaver and sculpted by Mint sculptor-engraver Charles L. Vickers. It features three scenes of (from left to right) a soldier surveying, two servicemen laying a flood wall, and a Redstone rocket taking off.

The reverse of the half dollar was designed by AIP artist Thomas Cleveland and sculpted by Mint sculptor Joseph Menna. It depicts a Continental Army soldier and an arc of 13 stars, symbolizing the Thirteen Colonies. The design was praised by the Citizens Coinage Advisory Committee and the Commission of Fine Arts.

=== Dollar ===
The obverse of the dollar was designed by AIP artist Richard Alan Masters and sculpted by Mint sculptor Michael Gaudioso. It depicted a male and female soldiers in front of a globe.

The reverse of the dollar was designed by AIP arist Susan Gamble and sculpted by Mint sculptor-engraver Don Everhart. It depicted the Great Seal of the United States surrounded by an inscription of the Army's seven core values: loyalty, duty, respect, selfless service, honor, integrity, and personal courage.

=== Half eagle ===
The obverse of the half eagle was designed by AIP artist Joel Iskowitz and sculpted by Mint sculptor Phebe Hemphill. It depicts five Army soldiers representative of five eras: the American Revolutionary War, the American Civil War, the present, World War II, and World War I respectively.

The reverse of the half eagle was designed and sculpted by Menna. It depicts the U.S. Army emblem.

== Striking ==
The half dollars were struck copper-nickel clad, with 91.67% copper and 8.33% nickel. The proof half dollars were struck at the San Francisco Mint. The uncirculated half dollars were struck at the Denver Mint, which had not struck a commemorative coin since 2001.

The dollars were struck in 90% silver and 10% copper. The uncirculated dollars were struck at the San Francisco Mint and the proof dollars were struck at the Philadelphia Mint.

The half eagles were struck in 90% gold and 10% copper. The uncirculated half eagles were struck at the Philadelphia Mint and the proof half eagles were struck at the West Point Mint.

== Release and reception ==
The coins were released for sale at noon Eastern Standard Time on January 31, 2011.

In 2012, Coin World noted that the uncirculated half dollar's mintage of 39,461 coins made it the lowest mintage modern commemorative half dollar at the time.

Numismatist Q. David Bowers, in his 2017 guidebook on United States commemorative coins, wrote that in the secondary market examples are "readily available."

United States Army commemorative coins sales (as of December 2012)
Sales option	Pre-issue price	Regular issue price	Mint and mint mark	Authorized mintage	Total sales
$5 proof	$449.95	$454.95	West Point (W)	100,000	17,148
$5 uncirculated	$439.95	$444.95	Philadelphia (P)	100,000	8,052
$1 proof	$54.95	$59.95	Philadelphia (P)	500,000	119,829
$1 uncirculated	$49.95	$54.95	San Francisco (S)	500,000	43,512
$.50 proof	$17.95	$21.95	San Francisco (S)	750,000	68,332
$.50 uncirculated	$15.95	$19.95	Denver (D)	750,000	39,442
