= Lewis & Clark Bicentennial silver dollar =

Commemorative silver US dollar

Lewis & Clark Bicentennial dollar
- United States
- Value: 1 U.S. Dollar
- Mass: 26.730 g
- Diameter: 38.1 mm
- Thickness: 2.58 mm
- Edge: Reeded
- Composition: 90% Ag / 10% Cu
- Years of minting: 2004
- Mintage: 142,015 Uncirculated 351,989 Proof
- Mint marks: P

Obverse
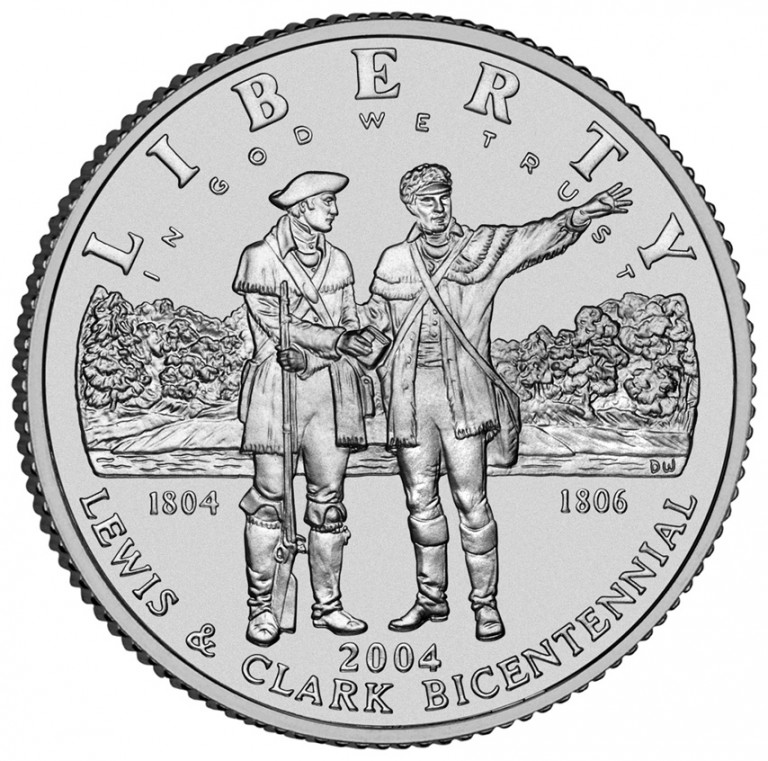
- Design: Lewis and Clark standing with a river and foliage.
- Designer: Donna Weaver
- Design date: 2004

Reverse
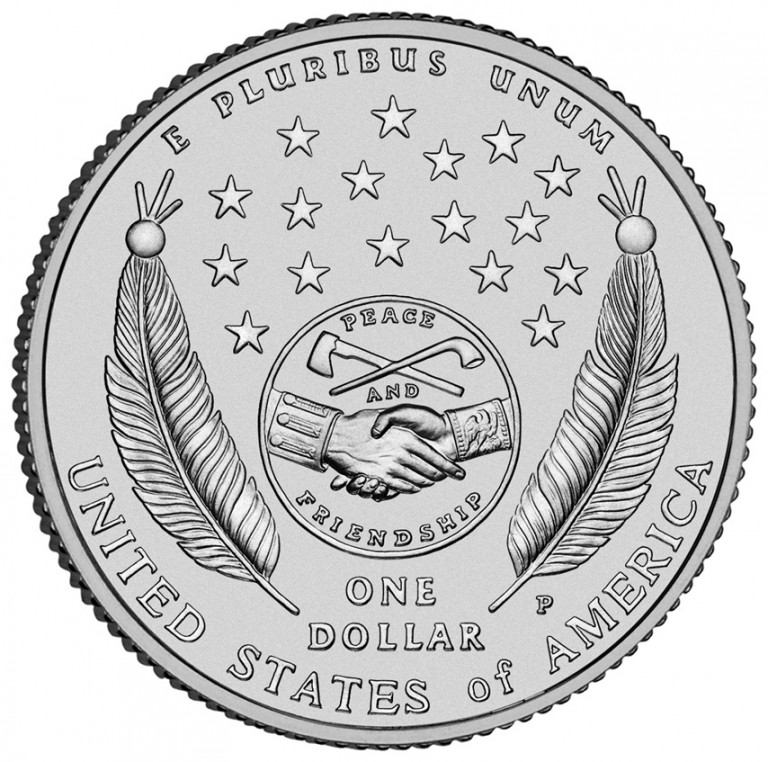
- Design: 17 stars with feathers to the left and right with an Indian peace medal designed by John Reich
- Designer: Donna Weaver
- Design date: 2004

The Lewis & Clark Bicentennial silver dollar is a commemorative coin issued by the United States Mint in 2004. The coin portrays American explorers Meriwether Lewis and William Clark, and was issued to commemorate the bicentennial of the 1804-1806 Lewis and Clark Expedition.

== Legislation ==
A bill titled the "Lewis and Clark Expedition Bicentennial Commemorative Coin Act" was introduced in the House of Representatives by Doug Bereuter of Nebraska on May 18, 1997 allowing the Mint to strike a silver dollar commemorating the Lewis and Clark Expedition. Senator Byron Dorgan of North Dakota also introduced a similar bill in the Senate. Bereuter's bill was passed by the House on September 18, 1998 and sent to the Senate. In the Senate, amendments were made to the bill stipulating that the Mint must also create medals commemorating the Little Rock Nine and Gerald and Betty Ford. The bill was sent back to the House where further amendments were made and it, and Dorgan's bill, subsequently died at the end of the 105th Congress.

Bereuter reintroduced the bill with minor changes in the House at the beginning of the 106th Congress on January 6, 1999, but it failed to pass. Bereuter introduced the bill for a third time on March 9, 1999. Senator Byron Dorgan of North Dakota also reintroduced his similar bill in the Senate on June 7, 1999. While Bereuter's third bill did pass the House, it was never passed in the Senate.

Legislation introduced on November 16, 1999 by Jim Leach of Iowa in the House to create the Leif Ericson Millennium silver dollar also included text to create a Lewis & Clark Bicentennial dollar, as well as commemorative coins to honor the Capitol Visitor Center. This version of the bill passed the House the same day and passed the Senate on November 19. The bill was signed into law (Pub. L. 106–126 (text) (PDF)) by President Bill Clinton on December 6, 1999.

== Design ==
The obverse features Meriwether Lewis and William Clark on a river bank surrounded by foliage. Lewis holds his journal and rifle while looking to Clark, who is gazing into the distance. Dates to either side of the men read "1804" and "1806" which were the start and end years of the expedition. The reverse of the coin features the reverse of the Jefferson Indian peace medal designed by John Reich, which was first presented to American Indians along the expedition on behalf of President Thomas Jefferson. The peace medal design was also used on the reverse of one of the Westward Journey Jefferson nickels. Beside the medal are two feathers intended to represent the Native American cultures that the expedition met and the seventeen stars above the medal represent the 17 U.S. states in the United States in 1804. Both the obverse and reverse were designed and sculpted by Donna Weaver. The design was unveiled as part of a ceremony at the Monticello on January 18, 2003.

== Production and distribution ==
The legislation authorized a maximum mintage of 500,000 uncirculated and proof coins. Some uncirculated coins were sold as part of the Lewis and Clark Coin and Currency set that also included a 2004 Westward Journey Jefferson nickels, a 2004 Sacagawea dollar, and a replica of a 1901 United States ten dollar note which featured Lewis and Clark. The Coin and Currency set also included three commemorative USPS stamps and a two booklets written by archivists at the National Archives and Records Administration about the expedition and the Louisiana Purchase. A different special set included a proof coin and a handmade unique American Indian pouch with a certificate of authenticity signed by each pouch maker. Both of the sets were issued with a limit of 50,000. 142,015 uncirculated coins were minted, of which 49,934 were part of the Coin and Currency set, and 351,989 proof coins were minted, of which 48,835 were sold as part of the Coin and Pouch set, for a total mintage of 494,004.

The coin announced for release on May 12, 2004 during an event held at the Missouri History Museum. The uncirculated coin and proof coin were sold at pre-issue prices of $33 and $35 dollars, respectively, which later increased to $35 and $39, respectively. The Coin and Currency set, priced at $120, were sold out in a week. The Coin and Pouch sets were delayed until September 7 due to slow production of the pouches. The Coin and Pouch sets, priced at $120, also sold out in a week. The Mint warned buyers to not store the coin inside the pouch as it would damage the coin. Some pouches made by Wyonna and Errol Medicine of the Standing Rock Sioux were found being sold on eBay after the Mint rejected them for poor quality.

A $10 surcharge was included in the price of each coin, with two-thirds of the proceeds to be paid to the National Lewis and Clark Bicentennial Council and one-third to the National Park Service. However, in 2006, the Lewis and Clark Commemorative Coin Correction Act (Pub. L. 109–232 (text) (PDF)), introduced by Representative Jo Ann Emerson of Missouri, was passed and enacted into law. The new law specified that the surcharges would now be split between the National Council of the Lewis and Clark Bicentennial and the Missouri Historical Society, with any funds that remain after June 30, 2007 to be transferred to the Lewis and Clark Trail Heritage Foundation. This was due to the fact that the National Park Service would be unable to receive a portion of the surcharge due to funding requirement statutes.

== Reception ==
When the coins were released they were very popular for modern commemoratives, and the special sets sold out quickly. Intricately designed pouches from the Coin and Pouch sets sold for high prices on the secondary market. Numismatist Q. David Bowers called the program "a rousing success." Anthony Swiatek, in his volume on commemoratives, noted that buyers should get the coin "for the joy of ownership only," as the high sales and graded population mean the coin is unlikely to increase in value.

In 2007, the Mint announced it was offering refunds for some purchasers of the Coin and Pouch set after it was revealed that around 2,000 pouches were made by the Shawnee Nation United Remnant Band of Ohio, which was not recognized as an Indian tribe by state or federal officials according to the Indian Arts and Crafts Board.

== See also ==
- List of United States commemorative coins and medals (2000s)
- United States commemorative coins
- Westward Journey "Peace Medal" nickel
