= Louis Braille Bicentennial silver dollar =

2009 US commemorative coin

Louis Braille Bicentennial dollar
- United States
- Value: 1 U.S. dollar
- Mass: 26.73 g
- Diameter: 38.1 mm (1.50 in)
- Edge: reeded
- Composition: 90% silver; 10% copper
- Years of minting: 2009
- Mintage: 82,639 Uncirculated; 135,235 Proof
- Mint marks: P

Obverse
- Design: Portrait of Louis Braille
- Designer: Joel Iskowitz

Reverse
- Design: A child reading a book in braille with braille characters above
- Designer: Susan Gamble

The Louis Braille Bicentennial silver dollar is a commemorative coin issued by the United States Mint in 2009 to commemorate the bicentennial of the birth of Louis Braille, the inventor of the braille writing system.

== Background and legislation ==
Born in France in 1809, Louis Braille became blinded at the age of three. While attending a school for the blind in Paris, Braille invented a communications system using patterns based on six raised dots based on a military code created by Charles Barbier. That system, called braille after its creator, is widely used by blind and visually impaired people to read and write.

The Louis Braille Bicentennial-Braille Literacy Commemorative Coin Act (Pub. L. 109–247 (text) (PDF)) was signed into law on July 27, 2006, by President George W. Bush. The law authorized the production of a commemorative silver dollar to commemorate the bicentennial of the birth of Louis Braille. The act allowed a maximum of 400,000 coins to be struck in both proof and uncirculated finishes. A $10 surcharge on the sale of each coin went to the National Federation of the Blind.

== Design ==
The obverse of the dollar was designed by Artistic Infusion Program (AIP) artist Joel Iskowitz and sculpted by Mint medallic artist Phebe Hemphill. It features a portrait of Louis Braille with the inscriptions LIBERTY above and LOUIS BRAILLE below, and IN GOD WE TRUST on the right. The dual dates 1809 and 2009 appear on each side of the portrait, with the mint mark P below 2009.

The reverse was designed by AIP artist Susan Gamble and sculpted by Mint medallic artist Joseph Menna. It shows a child reading a book in braille below the letters ⠃⠗⠇(Brl, the abbreviation for braille) in braille. The coin is the fourth U.S. coin to feature braille, after the 1995 and 1996 Paralympic silver dollars and the 2003 Alabama state quarter; the coin is the first to feature readable braille, as the braille was too small to be read on the prior coins.

== Production ==
Both the proof and uncirculated coins were struck at the Philadelphia Mint. The coin has a composition of 90% silver and 10% copper, and has reeded edges. It has a weight of 26.73 grams (0.943 oz) and a diameter of 38.1 millimetres (1.50 in).

== Release ==
The coin was first released on March 26, 2009.

== See also ==
- List of United States commemorative coins and medals (2000s)
- United States commemorative coins
