= Greatest Generation commemorative coins =

US commemorative coins issued in 2024

The Greatest Generation commemorative coins were a series of commemorative coins issued by the United States Mint in 2024 to commemorate the World War II Memorial in Washington, D.C..

== Legislation ==
The Greatest Generation Commemorative Coin Act (Pub. L. 117–162 (text) (PDF)) was passed by the 117th Congress and signed into law by President Joe Biden on August 3, 2022. The legislation authorized the United States Mint to strike half dollars, dollars, and half eagles in commemoration of the National World War II Memorial in Washington, D.C. 50,000 half eagles, 400,000 silver dollars, and 750,000 half dollars were authorized to be struck.

== Designs ==
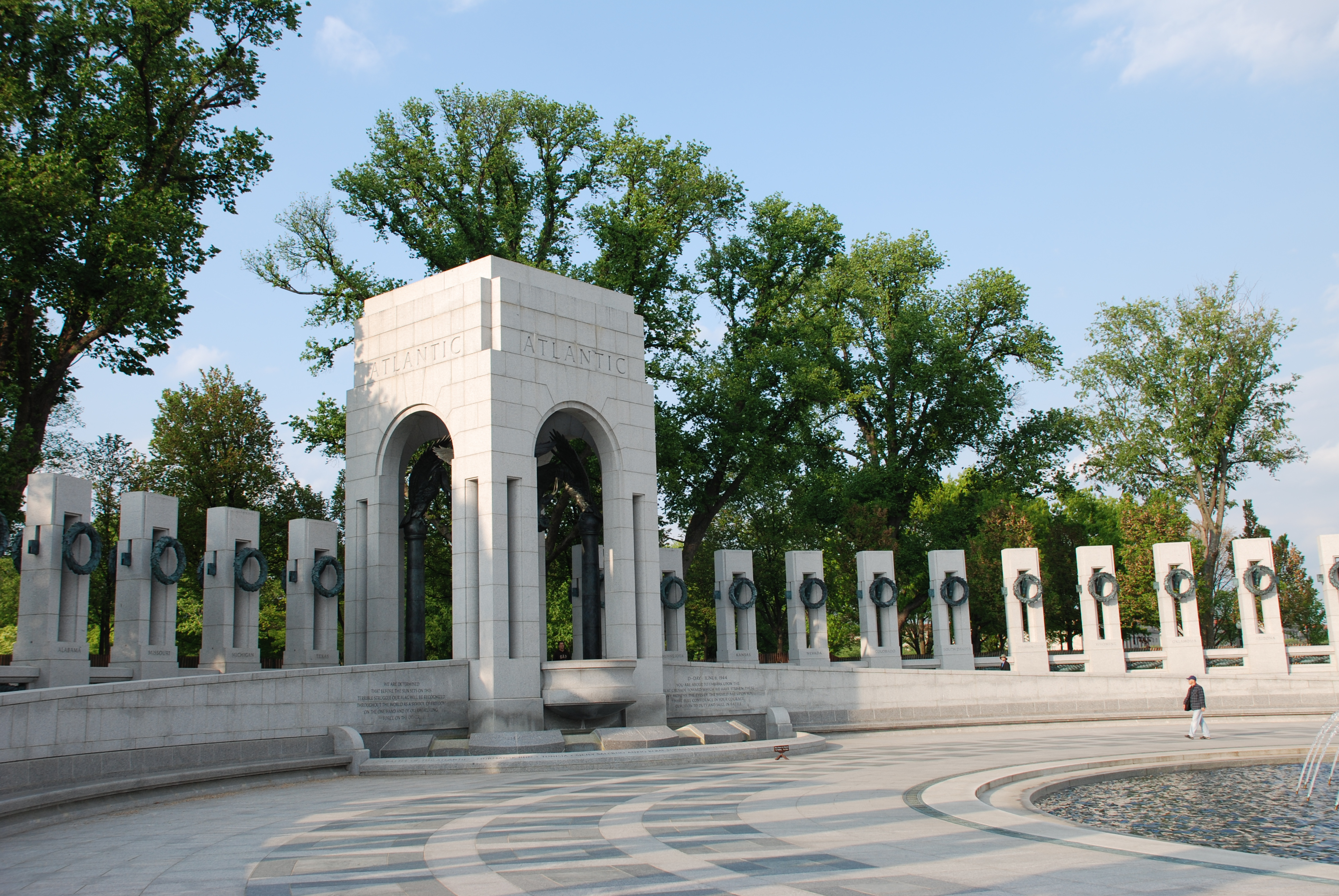
The World War II Memorial at Washington, D.C.

The Citizens Coinage Advisory Committee recommended designs for the coins on April 18, 2023. The Commission of Fine Arts recommended the same designs on April 20, suggesting only a minor change for the stars on the flag on the reverse of the half eagle. After approval by Treasury Secretary Janet Yellen, the final designs were unveiled during a ceremony at the memorial on September 20. Every coin was designed by an Artistic Infusion Program (AIP) artist and sculpted by a Mint medallic artist.

=== Half dollar ===
The half dollar design for the obverse was originally one of the proposed designs for the silver dollar obverse. The obverse, designed by AIP artist Elana Hagler and sculpted by Mint medallic artist Craig A. Campbell, depicts a reimagining of the World War II Victory Medal featuring a figure of Liberation. The reverse, designed by AIP artist Matt Swaim and sculpted by Mint medallic artist John P. McGraw, depicts a view of the World War II Memorial when walking to one of the towers.

=== Dollar ===
The obverse for the dollar, designed by AIP artist Beth Zaiken and sculpted by Mint medallic artist Phebe Hemphill, features six figures holding up the Earth with the inscriptions WORLD WAR II MEMORIAL, 1941-1945, and DEFENDERS OF FREEDOM. The figures represent each branch of the United States Armed Forces and the United States Merchant Marines. The reverse, designed by AIP artist Ben Sowards and sculpted by Mint medallic artist Renata Gordon, depicts the baldachino as if viewing from inside one of the victory pavilions at the memorial with four eagles holding a laurel wreath with a globe focused on the Pacific Ocean.

=== Half eagle ===
The obverse of the half eagle, designed by AIP artist Heidi Wastweet and sculpted by Mint medallic artist Eric David Custer, depicts the Wall of Stars at the memorial and an olive branch. The reverse, designed by Sowards and sculpted by Mint Chief Engraver Joseph Menna, depicts a folded flag and the inscriptions WWII MEMORIAL and TO UNITE THE GENERATIONS OF TOMORROW.

== Production ==
The half dollar was struck in copper-nickel clad, the dollar was struck in .999 fine silver, and the half eagle was struck in .900 fine gold. The Mint began striking coins on December 13, 2022. The coins were struck both in proof and uncirculated finishes. The gold half eagles were struck at the West Point Mint and the silver dollars were struck at the Philadelphia Mint. The proof half dollar was struck at the San Francisco Mint and the uncirculated half dollar was struck at the Denver Mint. Excluding the 4,692 3-coin proof sets sold, 2,935 gold half eagles, 45,258 silver dollars, and 27,095 clad half dollars were struck.

== Release and reception ==
The Mint began accepting orders for the coins on its website on February 29, 2024. Both proof and uncirculated coins were sold individually, and a 3-coin proof set was offered. Surcharges from sales of the coins were paid to the Friends of the National World War II Memorial, a nonprofit organization, to support the memorial.

== See also ==
- Greatest Generation
- United States commemorative coins
- List of United States commemorative coins and medals (2020s)
