= List of United States commemorative coins (2000s) =

== 2000 ==
=== Non-circulating coins ===
Face value	Coin	Obverse design	Reverse design	Composition	Mintage	Available	Obverse	Reverse
$1	Library of Congress dollar	Depicts an open book superimposed over the torch of learning	Architectural rendering of the dome on the Library of Congress' Jefferson building	Ag 90%, Cu 10%	Authorized: 500,000 (max) Uncirculated: 52,771 P Proof: 196,900 P	April 24, 2000 – December 31, 2000		
$10	Library of Congress eagle	Hand of Minerva raising the torch of learning over the dome of the Jefferson building	The Library of Congress seal encircled by a laurel leaf	Au 48%, Pt 48%, alloy 4%	Authorized: 200,000 (max) Uncirculated: 6,683 W Proof: 27,167 W	April 24, 2000 – December 31, 2000		
$1	Leif Ericson Millennium dollar	Portrait of Leif Ericson	Ericson's ship under full sail	Ag 90%, Cu 10%	Authorized: 500,000 (max) Uncirculated: 28,150 P Proof: 58,612 P	June 21, 2000 – February 28, 2001		
Kr 1,000	Leif Ericson Millennium 1,000 Krona coin	Image of Stirling Calder’s sculpture of Leif Ericson	An eagle, a dragon, a bull and the giant from the Icelandic Coat of Arms.	Ag 90%, Cu 10%	Authorized: 150,000 (max) Proof: 15,947 (P)	June 21, 2000 – February 28, 2001		

=== Circulating coins ===
Face value	Coin	Obverse design	Reverse design	Mintage	Obverse	Reverse
25¢	Massachusetts quarter	George Washington	The Minuteman statue, state outline Caption: "The Bay State"	Circulation: 628,600,000 P 535,184,000 D Proof: 4,020,172 S (clad); 965,421 S (silver)		
25¢	Maryland quarter	George Washington	Dome of the Maryland State House, white oak (state tree) clusters Caption: "The Old Line State"	Circulation: 678,200,000 P 556,532,000 D Proof: 4,020,172 S (clad); 965,421 S (silver)		
25¢	South Carolina quarter	George Washington	Carolina wren (state bird), yellow jessamine (state flower), cabbage palmetto (state tree), state outline Caption: "The Palmetto State"	Circulation: 373,400,000 P 401,424,000 D Proof: 4,020,172 S (clad); 965,421 S (silver)		
25¢	New Hampshire quarter	George Washington	Old Man of the Mountain, nine stars Captions: "Old Man of the Mountain", "Live Free or Die"	Circulation: 673,040,000 P 495,976,000 D Proof: 4,020,172 S (clad); 965,421 S (silver)		
25¢	Virginia quarter	George Washington	Ships Susan Constant, Godspeed, Discovery Captions: "Jamestown, 1607–2007", "Quadricentennial"	Circulation: 943,000,000 P 651,616,000 D Proof: 4,020,172 S (clad); 965,421 S (silver)		

== 2001 ==
=== Non-circulating coins ===
Face value	Coin	Obverse design	Reverse design	Composition	Mintage	Available	Obverse	Reverse
$1	American Buffalo dollar	Buffalo nickel obverse	Buffalo nickel reverse	Ag 90%, Cu 10%	Authorized: 500,000 (max) Uncirculated: 197,131 D Proof: 272,869 P	June 7, 2001 – June 21, 2001		
50¢	U.S. Capitol Visitor Center half dollar	Original capitol building within an outline of the present day Capitol	16 stars and the inscription "32 Senators; 106 House Members"	Cu 92%, Ni 8%	Authorized: 750,000 (max) Uncirculated: 99,157 P Proof: 77,962 P	2001		
$1	U.S. Capitol Visitor Center dollar	Original Capitol superimposed on the image of today's Capitol building	Bald eagle cloaked in a banner inscribed "U.S. Capitol Visitor Center"	Ag 90%, Cu 10%	Authorized: 500,000 (max) Uncirculated: 66,636 P Proof: 143,793 P	2001		
$5	U.S. Capitol Visitor Center half eagle	Corinthian column	Image of the original Capitol building	Au 90%, Ag 6%, Cu 4%	Authorized: 100,000 (max) Uncirculated: 6,761 W Proof: 27,652 W	2001		

=== Circulating coins ===
Face value	Coin	Obverse design	Reverse design	Mintage	Obverse	Reverse
25¢	New York quarter	George Washington	Statue of Liberty, 11 stars, state outline with line tracing Hudson River and Erie Canal Caption: "Gateway to Freedom"	Circulation: 619,640,000 P 655,400,000 D Proof: 3,094,140 S (clad); 889,697 S (silver)		
25¢	North Carolina quarter	George Washington	Wright Flyer, John T. Daniels's iconic photo of the Wright brothers Caption: "First Flight"	Circulation: 627,600,000 P 427,876,000 D Proof: 3,094,140 S (clad); 889,697 S (silver)		
25¢	Rhode Island quarter	George Washington	America's Cup yacht Reliance on Narragansett Bay, Claiborne Pell Newport Bridge Caption: "The Ocean State"	Circulation: 423,000,000 P 447,100,000 D Proof: 3,094,140 S (clad); 889,697 S (silver)		
25¢	Vermont quarter	George Washington	Maple trees with sap buckets, Camel's Hump Mountain Caption: "Freedom and Unity"	Circulation: 423,400,000 P 459,404,000 D Proof: 3,094,140 S (clad); 889,697 S (silver)		
25¢	Kentucky quarter	George Washington	Thoroughbred racehorse behind fence, Bardstown mansion, Federal Hill Caption: "My Old Kentucky Home"	Circulation: 353,000,000 P 370,564,000 D Proof: 3,094,140 S (clad); 889,697 S (silver)		

== 2002 ==
=== Non-circulating coins ===
Face value	Coin	Obverse design	Reverse design	Composition	Mintage	Available	Obverse	Reverse
$1	2002 Winter Olympics dollar	Crystal Emblem of the 2002 Olympic Winter Games, Olympic Rings, and the Games' secondary identity mark entitled: "Rhythm of the Land"	Salt Lake City skyline with the Rocky Mountains in the background	Ag 90%, Cu 10%	Authorized: 400,000 (max) Uncirculated: 35,388 P Proof: 142,873 P	2002		
$5	2002 Winter Olympics half eagle	Crystal Emblem superimposed on top of the Games' secondary identity mark entitled: "Rhythm of the Land"	Olympic flame in relief atop a cauldron	Au 90%, Ag 6%, Cu 4%	Authorized: 80,000 (max) Uncirculated: 10,585 W Proof: 32,877 W	2002		
$1	West Point Bicentennial dollar	Depicts a cadet color guard in parade with the Military Academy's Washington Hall and Cadet Chapel in the background	United States Military Academy Bicentennial logo	Ag 90%, Cu 10%	Authorized: 500,000 (max) Uncirculated: 103,201 W Proof: 288,293 W	2002		

=== Circulating coins ===
Face value	Coin	Obverse design	Reverse design	Mintage	Obverse	Reverse
25¢	Tennessee quarter	George Washington	Fiddle, trumpet, guitar, musical score, three stars Banner with text: "Musical Heritage"	Circulation: 361,600,000 P 286,468,000 D Proof: 3,084,245 S (clad); 892,229 S (silver)		
25¢	Ohio quarter	George Washington	Wright Flyer (built by the Wright Brothers who were from Dayton); astronaut (Neil Armstrong, a native of Wapakoneta); state outline Caption: "Birthplace of Aviation Pioneers"	Circulation: 217,200,000 P 414,832,000 D Proof: 3,084,245 S (clad); 892,229 S (silver)		
25¢	Louisiana quarter	George Washington	Brown pelican (state bird); trumpet with musical notes, outline of Louisiana Purchase on map of US Caption: "Louisiana Purchase"	Circulation: 362,000,000 P 402,204,000 D Proof: 3,084,245 S (clad); 892,229 S (silver)		
25¢	Indiana quarter	George Washington	IndyCar, state outline, 19 stars Caption: "Crossroads of America"	Circulation: 362,600,000 P 327,200,000 D Proof: 3,084,245 S (clad); 892,229 S (silver)		
25¢	Mississippi quarter	George Washington	Two magnolia blossoms (state flower) Caption: "The Magnolia State"	Circulation: 290,000,000 P 289,600,000 D Proof: 3,084,245 S (clad); 892,229 S (silver)		

== 2003 ==
=== Non-circulating coins ===
Face value	Coin	Obverse design	Reverse design	Composition	Mintage	Available	Obverse	Reverse
50¢	First in Flight Centennial half dollar	Wright Monument, atop Kill Devil Hill near Kitty Hawk, NC	An image of the 1903 Wright Flyer making its historic first flight, with Orville Wright aboard and his brother Wilbur on the ground beside the craft	Cu 92%, Ni 8%	Authorized: 750,000 (max) Uncirculated: 57,122 P Proof: 109,710 P	August 1, 2003 – July 31, 2004		
$1	First in Flight Centennial dollar	Orville and Wilbur Wright in profile	The 1903 Wright Flyer, in flight above the dunes at Kill Devil Hill, near Kitty Hawk, NC	Ag 90%, Cu 10%	Authorized: 500,000 (max) Uncirculated: 53,533 P Proof: 190,240 P	August 1, 2003 – July 31, 2004		
$10	First in Flight Centennial eagle	Portrait of Orville and Wilbur Wright	An eagle in flight above an image of the 1903 Wright Flyer, the first powered, heavier-than-air machine to achieve controlled, sustained flight with a pilot aboard	Au 90%, Ag 6%, Cu 4%	Authorized: 100,000 (max) Uncirculated: 10,009 P Proof: 21,676 P	August 1, 2003 – July 31, 2004		

=== Circulating coins ===
Face value	Coin	Obverse design	Reverse design	Mintage	Obverse	Reverse
25¢	Illinois quarter	George Washington	Young Abraham Lincoln; farm scene; Chicago skyline; state outline; 21 stars, 11 on left edge and 10 on right Captions: "Land of Lincoln;" "21st state/century"	Circulation: 225,800,000 P 237,400,000 D Proof: 3,408,516 S (clad); 1,125,755 S (silver)		
25¢	Alabama quarter	George Washington	Helen Keller, seated, longleaf pine (state tree) branch, magnolia blossoms Banner with text: "Spirit of Courage" Caption: "Helen Keller" in standard print and Braille	Circulation: 225,000,000 P 232,400,000 D Proof: 3,408,516 S (clad); 1,125,755 S (silver)		
25¢	Maine quarter	George Washington	Pemaquid Point Lighthouse; the schooner Victory Chimes at sea	Circulation: 217,400,000 P 231,400,000 D Proof: 3,408,516 S (clad); 1,125,755 S (silver)		
25¢	Missouri quarter	George Washington	Gateway Arch, Lewis and Clark and York returning down Missouri River Caption: "Corps of Discovery 1804–2004"	Circulation: 225,000,000 P 228,200,000 D Proof: 3,408,516 S (clad); 1,125,755 S (silver)		
25¢	Arkansas quarter	George Washington	Diamond (state gem), rice stalks, mallard flying above a lake	Circulation: 228,000,000 P 229,800,000 D Proof: 3,408,516 S (clad); 1,125,755 S (silver)		

== 2004 ==
=== Non-circulating coins ===
Face value	Coin	Obverse design	Reverse design	Composition	Mintage	Available	Obverse	Reverse
$1	Thomas Alva Edison dollar	Portrait of the Thomas Edison holding an early experimental light bulb in his laboratory	Rendering of Edison's first light bulb	Ag 90%, Cu 10%	Authorized: 500,000 (max) Uncirculated: 68,031 P Proof: 213,409 P	2004		
$1	Lewis & Clark Bicentennial dollar	Captains Lewis and Clark on a stream bank planning another day of exploration	Two feathers, an image of the original Jefferson Peace Medal presented, surrounded by 17 stars representing the number of states in the Union in 1804	Ag 90%, Cu 10%	Authorized: 500,000 (max) Uncirculated: 90,323 P Proof: 288,492 P	2004		

=== Circulating coins ===
Face value	Coin	Obverse design	Reverse design	Mintage	Obverse	Reverse
5¢	Westward Journey "Peace Medal" nickel	Thomas Jefferson	Based on the Indian Peace Medal	Circulation: 361,440,000 P 372,000,000 D Proof: 2,992,069 S		
5¢	Westward Journey "Keelboat" nickel	Thomas Jefferson	Keelboat	Circulation: 366,720,000 P 344,880,000 D Proof: 2,992,069 S		
25¢	Michigan quarter	George Washington	State outline, outline of Great Lakes system Caption: "Great Lakes State"	Circulation: 233,800,000 P 225,800,000 D Proof: 2,740,684 S (clad); 1,769,786 S (silver)		
25¢	Florida quarter	George Washington	Spanish galleon, Sabal palmetto (state tree), Space Shuttle Caption: "Gateway to Discovery"	Circulation: 240,200,000 P 241,600,000 D Proof: 2,740,684 S (clad); 1,769,786 S (silver)		
25¢	Texas quarter	George Washington	State outline, star, lariat Caption: "The Lone Star State"	Circulation: 278,800,000 P 263,000,000 D Proof: 2,740,684 S (clad); 1,769,786 S (silver)		
25¢	Iowa quarter	George Washington	Schoolhouse, teacher and students planting a tree; based on the Grant Wood painting Arbor Day Captions: "Foundation in Education", "Grant Wood"	Circulation: 213,800,000 P 251,400,000 D Proof: 2,740,684 S (clad); 1,769,786 S (silver)		
25¢	Wisconsin quarter	George Washington	Head of a cow, round of cheese and ear of corn (state grain). Banner with text: "Forward"	Circulation: 226,400,000 P 226,800,000 D Proof: 2,740,684 S (clad); 1,769,786 S (silver)		

== 2005 ==
=== Non-circulating coins ===
Face value	Coin	Obverse design	Reverse design	Composition	Mintage	Available	Obverse	Reverse
$1	Chief Justice John Marshall dollar	Profile of Chief Justice John Marshall	A view of the Old Supreme Court Chamber.	Ag 90%, Cu 10%	Authorized: 400,000 (max) Uncirculated: 48,953 P Proof: 141,993 P	2005		
$1	Marine Corps 230th Anniversary dollar	Historic Raising the Flag on Iwo Jima	Eagle, Globe, and Anchor	Ag 90%, Cu 10%	Authorized: 600,000 (max) Uncirculated: 130,000 P Proof: 370,000 P	2005		

=== Circulating coins ===
Face value	Coin	Obverse design	Reverse design	Mintage	Obverse	Reverse
5¢	Westward Journey "Bison" nickel	Thomas Jefferson	American bison	Circulation: 448,320,000 P 487,680,000 D Uncirculated: ---- P (satin) ---- D (satin) Proof: 3,344,679 S		
5¢	Westward Journey "Ocean" nickel	Thomas Jefferson	Pacific coast, "Ocean in view! O! The Joy!"	Circulation: 394,080,000 P 411,120,000 D Uncirculated: ---- P (satin) ---- D (satin) Proof: 3,344,679 S		
25¢	California quarter	George Washington	John Muir, California condor, Half Dome Captions: "John Muir," "Yosemite Valley"	Circulation: 257,200,000 P 263,200,000 D Uncirculated: ---- P (satin) ---- D (satin) Proof: 3,262,960 S (clad); 1,678,649 S (silver)		
25¢	Minnesota quarter	George Washington	Common loon (state bird), fishing, state map Caption: "Land of 10,000 Lakes"	Circulation: 239,600,000 P 248,400,000 D Uncirculated: ---- P (satin) ---- D (satin) Proof: 3,262,960 S (clad); 1,678,649 S (silver)		
25¢	Oregon quarter	George Washington	Crater Lake National Park Caption: "Crater Lake"	Circulation: 316,200,000 P 404,000,000 D Uncirculated: ---- P (satin) ---- D (satin) Proof: 3,262,960 S (clad); 1,678,649 S (silver)		
25¢	Kansas quarter	George Washington	American bison (state mammal), sunflowers (state flower)	Circulation: 263,400,000 P 300,000,000 D Uncirculated: ---- P (satin) ---- D (satin) Proof: 3,262,960 S (clad); 1,678,649 S (silver)		
25¢	West Virginia quarter	George Washington	New River Gorge Bridge Caption: "New River Gorge"	Circulation: 365,400,000 P 356,200,000 D Uncirculated: ---- P (satin) ---- D (satin) Proof: 3,262,960 S (clad); 1,678,649 S (silver)		

== 2006 ==
=== Non-circulating coins ===
Face value	Coin	Obverse design	Reverse design	Composition	Mintage	Available	Obverse	Reverse
$1	Benjamin Franklin dollar (Scientist)	A representation of Benjamin Franklin’s famous kite experiment	Benjamin Franklin's Join, or Die cartoon, published in the Pennsylvania Gazette on May 9, 1754	Ag 90%, Cu 10%	Authorized: 250,000 (max) Uncirculating: 58,000 P Proof: 142,000 P	2006		
$1	Benjamin Franklin dollar (Founding Father)	An image of Benjamin Franklin	Taken from a 1776 Continental Dollar, featuring designs originally created by Benjamin Franklin	Ag 90%, Cu 10%	Authorized: 250,000 (max) Uncirculating: 58,000 P Proof: 142,000 P	2006		
$1	San Francisco Old Mint dollar	A rendition of the Old Mint originally prepared for the San Francisco Mint Medal	A replica of the 1904 Morgan Silver Dollar eagle reverse	Ag 90%, Cu 10%	Authorized: 500,000 (max) Uncirculating: 65,609 S Proof: 255,700 S	2006		
$5	San Francisco Old Mint half eagle	A rendition of the Old Mint modeled after the original construction drawing by architect Alfred B. Mullett	A replica of the 1906 Coronet Half-Eagle reverse	Au 90%, Ag 6%, Cu 4%	Authorized: 100,000 (max) Uncirculating: 16,230 S Proof: 41,517 S	2006		

=== Circulating coins ===
Face value	Coin	Obverse design	Reverse design	Mintage	Obverse	Reverse
25¢	Nevada quarter	George Washington	Mustangs, mountains, rising sun, sagebrush (state flower) Banner with text: "The Silver State"	Circulation: 277,000,000 P 312,800,000 D Uncirculated: ---- P (satin) ---- D (satin) Proof: 2,882,428 S (clad); 1,585,008 S (silver)		
25¢	Nebraska quarter	George Washington	Chimney Rock National Historic Site, Conestoga wagon Caption: "Chimney Rock"	Circulation: 318,000,000 P 276,400,000 D Uncirculated: ---- P (satin) ---- D (satin) Proof: 2,882,428 S (clad); 1,585,008 S (silver)		
25¢	Colorado quarter	George Washington	Longs PeakBanner with text: "Colorful Colorado"	Circulation: 274,800,000 P 294,200,000 D Uncirculated: ---- P (satin) ---- D (satin) Proof: 2,882,428 S (clad); 1,585,008 S (silver)		
25¢	North Dakota quarter	George Washington	American bison, badlands	Circulation: 305,800,000 P 359,000,000 D Uncirculated: ---- P (satin) ---- D (satin) Proof: 2,882,428 S (clad); 1,585,008 S (silver)		
25¢	South Dakota quarter	George Washington	Mount Rushmore, ring-necked pheasant (state bird), wheat (state grass)	Circulation: 245,000,000 P 265,800,000 D Uncirculated: ---- P (satin) ---- D (satin) Proof: 2,882,428 S (clad); 1,585,008 S (silver)		

== 2007 ==
=== Non-circulating coins ===
Face value	Coin	Obverse design	Reverse design	Composition	Mintage	Available	Obverse	Reverse
$1	Jamestown 400th Anniversary dollar	Three Faces of Diversity, representing the three cultures that came together in Jamestown	A depiction of the Susan Constant, Godspeed, and Discovery that brought the first settlers to Jamestown in 1607	Ag 90%, Cu 10%	Authorized: 500,000 (max) Uncirculating: 79,801 P Proof: 258,802 P	2007		
$5	Jamestown 400th Anniversary half eagle	Capt. John Smith greeting an American Indian carrying a bag of corn	A current rendering of Jamestown Memorial Church, the only original remaining structure in Jamestown	Au 90%, Ag 6%, Cu 4%	Authorized: 100,000 (max) Uncirculating: 18,843 W Proof: 47,050 W	2007		
$1	Little Rock Central High School Desegregation dollar	Legs and feet of the students, accompanied by an armed United States soldier, walking to school	Little Rock Central High School circa 1957	Ag 90%, Cu 10%	Authorized: 500,000 (max) Uncirculating: 66,093 P Proof: 124,618 P	2007		
$10	Martha Washington eagle	Martha Washington	Mrs. Washington sewing, with slogan "First Lady of the Continental Army"	Au 99.99%	Authorized: 40,000 Uncirculated: 17,661 W Proof: 19,167 W	2007		
$10	Abigail Adams eagle	Abigail Adams	Mrs. Adams writing her famous "Remember the Ladies" letter	Au 99.99%	Authorized: 40,000 Uncirculated: 17,142 W Proof: 17,149 W	2007		
$10	Thomas Jefferson's Liberty eagle	Depiction of Liberty based on Draped Bust coinage	Jefferson's grave at Monticello	Au 99.99%	Authorized: 40,000 Uncirculated: 19,823 W Proof: 19,815 W	2007		
$10	Dolley Madison eagle	Dolley Madison	Mrs. Madison posing before the Lansdowne Portrait of Washington, which she saved during the Burning of Washington	Au 99.99%	Authorized: 40,000 Uncirculated: 12,340 W Proof: 17,943 W	2007		

=== Circulating coins ===
Face value	Coin	Obverse design	Reverse design	Mintage	Obverse	Reverse
25¢	Montana quarter	George Washington	American bison skull in the center with mountains and the Missouri River in the background. Caption: "Big Sky Country"	Circulation: 257,000,000 P 265,240,000 D Uncirculated: ---- P (satin) ---- D (satin) Proof: 2,374,778 S (clad); 1,313,481 S (silver)		
25¢	Washington quarter	George Washington	Salmon leaping in front of Mount Rainier Caption: "The Evergreen State"	Circulation: 265,200,000 P 280,000,000 D Uncirculated: ---- P (satin) ---- D (satin) Proof: 2,374,778 S (clad); 1,313,481 S (silver)		
25¢	Idaho quarter	George Washington	Peregrine falcon, state outline with star indicating location of state capital Boise, Idaho Caption: "Esto perpetua"	Circulation: 294,600,000 P 286,800,000 D Uncirculated: ---- P (satin) ---- D (satin) Proof: 2,374,778 S (clad); 1,313,481 S (silver)		
25¢	Wyoming quarter	George Washington	Bucking Horse and Rider Caption: "The Equality State"	Circulation: 243,600,000 P 320,800,000 D Uncirculated: ---- P (satin) ---- D (satin) Proof: 2,374,778 S (clad); 1,313,481 S (silver)		
25¢	Utah quarter	George Washington	Golden spike, Locomotives Jupiter, No. 119, and the completion of the Transcontinental Railroad Caption: "Crossroads of the West"	Circulation: 255,000,000 P 253,200,000 D Uncirculated: ---- P (satin) ---- D (satin) Proof: 2,374,778 S (clad); 1,313,481 S (silver)		
$1	George Washington dollar	George Washington	Statue of Liberty	Circulation: 176,680,000 P 163,680,000 D Uncirculated: ---- P (satin) ---- D (satin) Proof: 3,965,989 S		
$1	John Adams dollar	John Adams	Statue of Liberty	Circulation: 112,420,000 P 112,140,000 D Uncirculated: ---- P (satin) ---- D (satin) Proof: 3,965,989 S		
$1	Thomas Jefferson dollar	Thomas Jefferson	Statue of Liberty	Circulation: 100,800,000 P 102,810,000 D Uncirculated: ---- P (satin) ---- D (satin) Proof: 3,965,989 S		
$1	James Madison dollar	James Madison	Statue of Liberty	Circulation: 84,560,000 P 87,780,000 D Uncirculated: ---- P (satin) ---- D (satin) Proof: 3,965,989 S		

== 2008 ==
=== Non-circulating coins ===
Face value	Coin	Obverse design	Reverse design	Composition	Mintage	Available	Obverse	Reverse
50¢	Bald Eagle half dollar	Two baby eaglets settled in a nest with an unhatched egg	The famous eagle "Challenger" with the American flag in the background	Cu 92%, Ni 8%	Authorized: 750,000 (max) Uncirculated: 120,180 S Proof: 222,577 S	January 15, 2008 – December 12, 2008		
$1	Bald Eagle dollar	Bald eagle in flight	The Great Seal from 1782 to 1841	Ag 90%, Cu 10%	Authorized: 500,000 (max) Uncirculated: 110,073 P Proof: 243,558 P	January 15, 2008 – December 12, 2008		
$5	Bald Eagle half eagle	Two young eaglets resting on a branch in their natural habitat	The current Great Seal	Au 90%, Ag 6%, Cu 4%	Authorized: 100,000 (max) Uncirculated: 13,467 W Proof: 59,269 W	January 15, 2008 – December 12, 2008		
$10	Elizabeth Monroe eagle	Elizabeth Monroe	Mrs. Monroe at the reopening of the White House in 1818	Au 99.99%	Authorized: 40,000 (max) Uncirculated: 4,462 W Proof: 7,800 W	2008		
$10	Louisa Adams eagle	Louisa Adams	Mrs. Adams and her son Charles making the dangerous journey from St Petersburg to Paris in 1812	Au 99.99%	Authorized: 40,000 (max) Uncirculated: 3,885 W Proof: 6,581 W	2008		
$10	Andrew Jackson's Liberty eagle	Depiction of Liberty based on Capped Bust coinage	Jackson on horseback with his nickname "Old Hickory"	Au 99.99%	Authorized: 40,000 (max) Uncirculated: 4,609 W Proof: 7,684 W	2008		
$10	Martin Van Buren's Liberty eagle	Depiction of Liberty based on Seated Liberty coinage	Van Buren reading in the grass in his home village of Kinderhook	Au 99.99%	Authorized: 40,000 (max) Uncirculated: 3,826 W Proof: 6,807	2008		

=== Circulating coins ===
Face value	Coin	Obverse design	Reverse design	Mintage	Obverse	Reverse
25¢	Oklahoma quarter	George Washington	Scissor-tailed flycatcher (state bird), with Indian blankets (state wildflower) in background	Circulation: 222,000,000 P 194,600,000 D Uncirculated: ---- P (satin) ---- D (satin) Proof: 2,078,112 S (clad); 1,192,908 S (silver)		
25¢	New Mexico quarter	George Washington	State outline with relief, Zia Sun Symbol from flag Caption: "Land of Enchantment"	Circulation: 244,200,000 P 244,400,000 D Uncirculated: ---- P (satin) ---- D (satin) Proof: 2,078,112 S (clad); 1,192,908 S (silver)		
25¢	Arizona quarter	George Washington	Grand Canyon, saguaro closeup. Banner with text: "Grand Canyon State"	Circulation: 244,600,000 P 265,000,000 D Uncirculated: ---- P (satin) ---- D (satin) Proof: 2,078,112 S (clad); 1,192,908 S (silver)		
25¢	Alaska quarter	George Washington	Grizzly bear with salmon (state fish) and North Star Caption: "The Great Land"	Circulation: 251,800,000 P 254,000,000 D Uncirculated: ---- P (satin) ---- D (satin) Proof: 2,078,112 S (clad); 1,192,908 S (silver)		
25¢	Hawaii quarter	George Washington	Statue of Kamehameha I with state outline and motto Caption: "Ua Mau ke Ea o ka ʻĀina i ka Pono"	Circulation: 254,000,000 P 263,600,000 D Uncirculated: ---- P (satin) ---- D (satin) Proof: 2,078,112 S (clad); 1,192,908 S (silver)		
$1	James Monroe dollar	James Monroe	Statue of Liberty	Circulation: 64,260,000 P 60,230,000 D Uncirculated: ---- P (satin) ---- D (satin) Proof: 3,083,940 S		
$1	John Quincy Adams dollar	John Quincy Adams	Statue of Liberty	Circulation: 57,540,000 P 57,720,000 D Uncirculated: ---- P (satin) ---- D (satin) Proof: 3,083,940 S		
$1	Andrew Jackson dollar	Andrew Jackson	Statue of Liberty	Circulation: 61,080,000 P 61,070,000 D Uncirculated: ---- P (satin) ---- D (satin) Proof: 3,083,940 S		
$1	Martin Van Buren dollar	Martin Van Buren	Statue of Liberty	Circulation: 51,520,000 P 50,960,000 D Uncirculated: ---- P (satin) ---- D (satin) Proof: 3,083,940 S		

== 2009 ==
=== Non-circulating coins ===
Face value	Coin	Obverse design	Reverse design	Composition	Mintage	Available	Obverse	Reverse
$1	Abraham Lincoln Bicentennial dollar	President Lincoln's bust	Excerpt of Gettysburg Address	Ag 90%, Cu 10%	Authorized: 500,000 (max) Uncirculated: 125,000 P Proof: 375,000 P	2009		
$1	Louis Braille Bicentennial dollar	Louis Braille's Bust	Child reading a book in Braille	Ag 90%, Cu 10%	Authorized: 400,000 (max) Uncirculated: 82,639 P Proof: 135,235 P	March 26, 2009 – December 11, 2009		
$10	Anna Harrison eagle	Anna Harrison	Mrs. Harrison reading to her children	Au 99.99%	Authorized: 40,000 (max) Uncirculated: 3,645 W Proof: 6,251 W	2009		
$10	Letitia Tyler eagle	Letitia Tyler	Mrs. Tyler with children on Cedar Grove Plantation	Au 99.99%	Authorized: 40,000 (max) Uncirculated: 3,240 W Proof: 5,296 W	2009		
$10	Julia Tyler eagle	Julia Tyler	Mr. and Mrs. Tyler dancing	Au 99.99%	Authorized: 40,000 (max) Uncirculated: 3,143 W Proof: 4,844 W	2009		
$10	Sarah Polk eagle	Sarah Polk	Mr. and Mrs. Polk working together at a desk in the White House	Au 99.99%	Authorized: 40,000 (max) Uncirculated: 3,489 W Proof: 5,151 W	2009		
$10	Margaret Taylor eagle	Margaret Taylor	A young Mrs. Taylor tending to a wounded soldier during the First Seminole War	Au 99.99%	Authorized: 40,000 (max) Uncirculated: 3,627 W Proof: 4,936 W	2009		
$20	Saint-Gaudens high relief double eagle	Saint-Gaudens double eagle obverse with 50 stars	Saint-Gaudens double eagle reverse	Ag 99.9%	Uncirculated: 115,178 (W)	2009		

=== Circulating coins ===
Face value	Coin	Obverse design	Reverse design	Mintage	Obverse	Reverse
1¢	Lincoln Bicentennial "Birthplace" penny	Abraham Lincoln	Log cabin	Circulation: 284,400,000 P 350,400,000 D Uncirculated: 784,614 P (satin bronze); 784,614 D (satin bronze) Proof: 2,995,615 S		
1¢	Lincoln Bicentennial "Formative Years" penny	Abraham Lincoln	Young Lincoln reading while taking a break from rail splitting	Circulation: 284,400,000 P 350,400,000 D Uncirculated: 784,614 P (satin bronze); 784,614 D (satin bronze) Proof: 2,995,615 S		
1¢	Lincoln Bicentennial "Professional Life" penny	Abraham Lincoln	Lincoln as a young lawyer, standing before the Springfield Illinois State Capitol	Circulation: 284,400,000 P 350,400,000 D Uncirculated: 784,614 P (satin bronze); 784,614 D (satin bronze) Proof: 2,995,615 S		
1¢	Lincoln Bicentennial "Presidency" penny	Abraham Lincoln	Half completed Capitol dome	Circulation: 284,400,000 P 350,400,000 D Uncirculated: 784,614 P (satin bronze); 784,614 D (satin bronze) Proof: 2,995,615 S		
25¢	District of Columbia quarter	George Washington	Duke Ellington seated at a grand piano. Caption: "Duke Ellington" and "Justice for all"	Circulation: 83,600,000 P 88,800,000 D Uncirculated: ---- P (satin) ---- D (satin) Proof: 2,113,390 S (clad); 993,589 S (silver)		
25¢	Puerto Rico quarter	George Washington	A sentry box at Castillo San Felipe del Morro and a maga flower. Caption: "Isla del Encanto" (Island of enchantment)	Circulation: 83,600,000 P 88,800,000 D Uncirculated: ---- P (satin) ---- D (satin) Proof: 2,113,390 S (clad); 993,589 S (silver)		
25¢	Guam quarter	George Washington	An outline of the island, a proa boat, and a latte stone. Caption: "Guahan I Tanó ManChamorro" (Guam, land of the Chamorro)	Circulation: 83,600,000 P 88,800,000 D Uncirculated: ---- P (satin) ---- D (satin) Proof: 2,113,390 S (clad); 993,589 S (silver)		
25¢	American Samoa quarter	George Washington	An ava bowl, whisk and staff in the foreground with a coconut tree on the shore in the background. Caption: "Samoa Muamua le Atua" (Samoa, God is first)	Circulation: 83,600,000 P 88,800,000 D Uncirculated: ---- P (satin) ---- D (satin) Proof: 2,113,390 S (clad); 993,589 S (silver)		
25¢	U.S. Virgin Islands quarter	George Washington	An outline of the three major islands, the bananaquit, the yellow cedar or yellow elder, and a tyre palm tree. Caption: "United in Pride and Hope"	Circulation: 83,600,000 P 88,800,000 D Uncirculated: ---- P (satin) ---- D (satin) Proof: 2,113,390 S (clad); 993,589 S (silver)		
25¢	Northern Mariana Islands quarter	George Washington	Near the shore stand a large limestone latte, a canoe of the indigenous Carolinians, two white fairy terns, and a mwar (head lei)	Circulation: 83,600,000 P 88,800,000 D Uncirculated: ---- P (satin) ---- D (satin) Proof: 2,113,390 S (clad); 993,589 S (silver)		
$1	Native American "Agriculture" dollar	Sacagawea	Woman planting seeds	Circulation: 39,200,000 P 35,700,000 D Uncirculated: ---- P (satin) ---- D (satin) Proof: 2,179,867 S	see article: Sacagawea dollar	
$1	William Henry Harrison dollar	William Henry Harrison	Statue of Liberty	Circulation: 43,260,000 P 55,160,000 D Uncirculated: ---- P (satin) ---- D (satin) Proof: 3,965,989 S		
$1	John Tyler dollar	John Tyler	Statue of Liberty	Circulation: 43,260,000 P 55,160,000 D Uncirculated: ---- P (satin) ---- D (satin) Proof: 3,965,989 S		
$1	James K. Polk dollar	James K. Polk	Statue of Liberty	Circulation: 43,260,000 P 55,160,000 D Uncirculated: ---- P (satin) ---- D (satin) Proof: 3,965,989 S		
$1	Zachary Taylor dollar	Zachary Taylor	Statue of Liberty	Circulation: 43,260,000 P 55,160,000 D Uncirculated: ---- P (satin) ---- D (satin) Proof: 3,965,989 S		
