= Iskowitz =

Iskowitz is a surname. Notable people with the surname include:

- Gershon Iskowitz (1921–1988), Polish-born Canadian artist
- Joel Iskowitz (born 1946), American designer, book illustrator, print artist and stamp, coin, and medal designer
