= Abraham Lincoln Bicentennial silver dollar =

2009 U.S. commemorative coin

Abraham Lincoln Bicentennial commemorative dollar
- United States
- Value: 1 U.S. dollar
- Mass: 26.73 g
- Diameter: 38.1 mm (1.500 in)
- Composition: 90% Ag; 10% Cu
- Years of minting: 2009

Obverse
- Design: Bust of President Lincoln
- Designer: Justin Kunz

Reverse
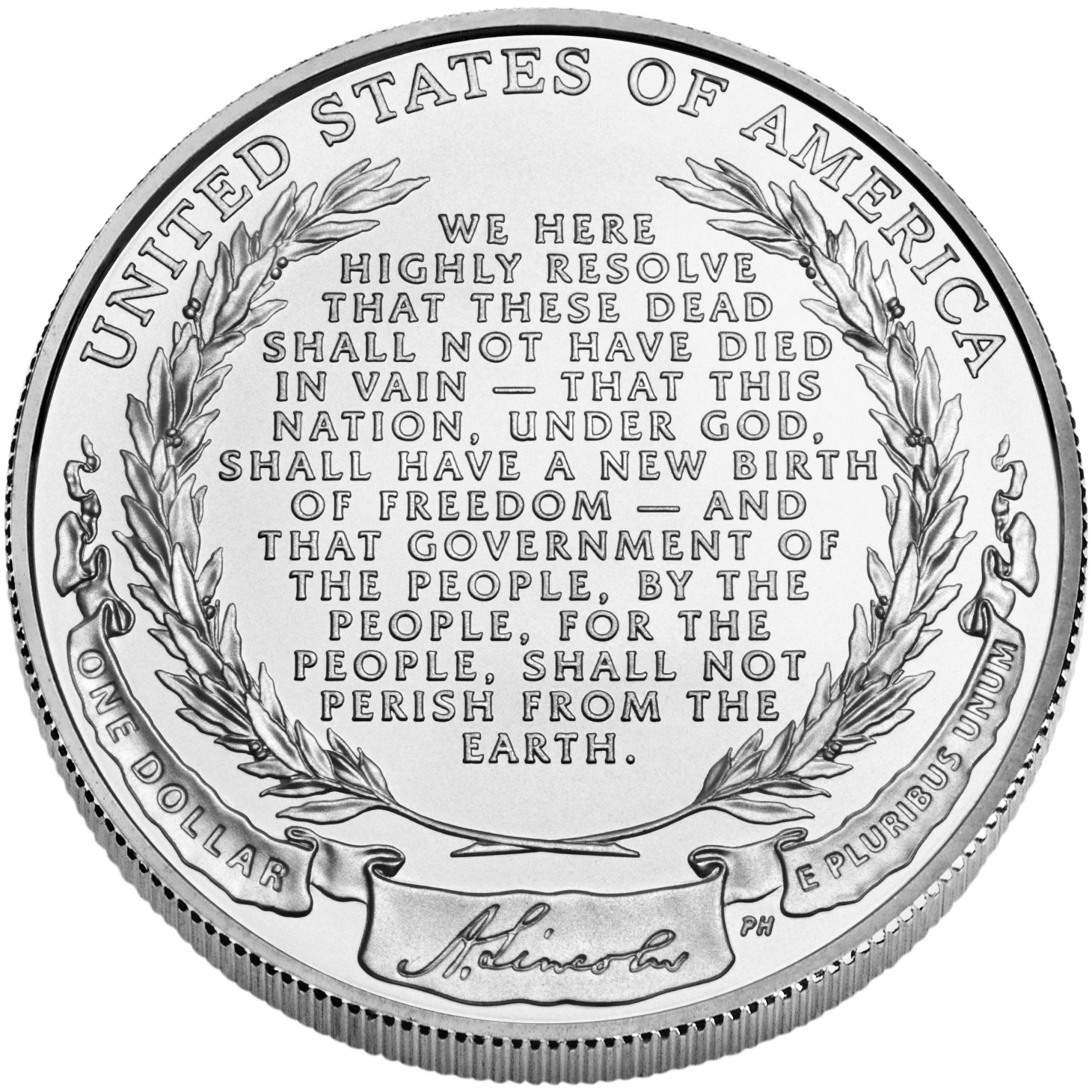
- Design: Excerpt from the Gettysburg Address
- Designer: Phebe Hemphill

The Abraham Lincoln Bicentennial silver dollar is a commemorative coin issued by the United States Mint in 2009.

== Legislation ==
The Abraham Lincoln Commemorative Coin Act (Pub. L. 109–285 (text) (PDF)) authorized the production of a commemorative silver dollar to commemorate the bicentennial of the birth of Abraham Lincoln, 16th president of the United States, and one of the country's greatest leaders, guiding the nation through the tumultuous American Civil War. The act allowed the coins to be struck in both proof and uncirculated finishes. The coin was first released on February 12, 2009, the 200th anniversary of Lincoln's birth.

== Design ==
The obverse of the Abraham Lincoln Bicentennial commemorative dollar, designed by Justin Kunz, depicts an image of President Lincoln, which was inspired by Daniel Chester French's famous sculpture of the President that sits inside the Lincoln Memorial in Washington. The reverse, designed by Phebe Hemphill, features the last 43 words of the Gettysburg Address.

== Specifications ==
- Display Box Color: Dark Blue
- Edge: Reeded
- Weight: 26.730 grams; 0.8594 troy ounce
- Diameter: 38.10 millimeters; 1.500 inches
- Composition: 90% Silver, 10% Copper

== See also ==
- Lincoln Bicentennial cents
- List of United States commemorative coins and medals (2000s)
- United States commemorative coins
