= Thomas S. Cleveland =

American designer, illustrator and fine artist

Thomas S. Cleveland (born June 8, 1960) is an American designer, illustrator and fine artist. He served in the United States Mint's Artistic Infusion Program from 2004 until 2014.

== Biography ==
Cleveland was born in Oklahoma and majored in advertising and illustration and design, with fine art painting as a minor, at East Texas State University. In 2003, Cleveland applied for the United States Mint's Artistic Infusion Program and in 2004, along with about twelve other designers, was selected for inclusion in the program from approximately 250 applicants.

== Work ==
Cleveland is credited with fifteen designs for United States coins and medals. His most notable work is the reverse design of the 2007 American Platinum Eagle. Cleveland's full United States Mint Coin Design Credits are:

- 2014 Florence Harding First Spouse Gold Coin Series, Obverse
- 2014 Florence Harding First Spouse Gold Coin Series, Reverse
- 2013 Meskwaki Nation Code Talker Congressional Gold Medal, Obverse
- 2013 Choctaw Nation Code Talker Congressional Gold Medal, Obverse
- 2013 Crow Creek Sioux Code Talker Congressional Gold Medal, Obverse
- 2013 Crow Creek Sioux Code Talker Congressional Gold Medal, Reverse
- 2012 Sacagawea Native American Dollar, Reverse
- 2011 Vicksburg Mississippi ATB Quarter, Reverse
- 2011 United States Army Half Dollar, Reverse
- 2010 Disabled American Veterans Silver Dollar, Reverse & Inscription
- 2010 Sacagawea Native American Dollar, Reverse
- 2009 Anna Harrison First Spouse Gold Coin Series, Reverse
- 2008 Martin Van Buren First Spouse Gold Coin Series, Reverse
- 2007 The Platinum American Eagle, Reverse
- 2007 Abigail Adams First Spouse Gold Coin, Reverse
