= United States Capitol Visitor Center commemorative coins =

Series of commemorative coins

The United States Capitol Visitor Center commemorative coins are three commemorative coins which were issued by the United States Mint in 2001 to commemorate the United States Capitol Visitor Center.

== Legislation ==
The United States Capitol Visitor Center Commemorative Coins Act (Pub. L. 102–126) authorized the production of three coins, a clad half dollar, a silver dollar, and a gold half eagle. The act allowed the coins to be struck in both proof and uncirculated finishes. The coins were released on February 28, 2001.

== Designs ==
=== Half Dollar ===
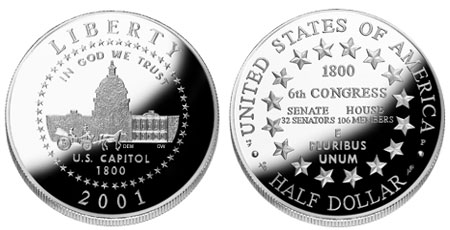
U.S. Capitol Visitor Center half dollar obverse (left) and reverse (right)

The obverse of the U.S. Capitol Visitor Center half dollar, designed by Dean McMullen, features the North Wing of the original Capitol superimposed on an outline of the present building with a horse drawn carriage in the foreground. The image is surrounded by a ring of 50 stars representing the 50 states of the Union. The reverse of the coin, designed by Alex Shagin and Marcel Jovine, features 16 stars - representing the 16 states that existed in 1800 - around the center, with inscriptions recognizing the 32 Senators and 106 House members of the 6th Congress.

=== Dollar ===
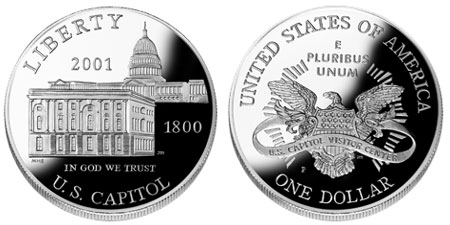
U.S. Capitol Visitor Center silver dollar obverse (left) and reverse (right)

The obverse of the U.S. Capitol Visitor Center dollar, designed by Marika Somogyi, features an image of the original Capitol in the foreground and the present building in the background. The reverse of the coin, designed by John Mercanti, features a contemporary interpretation of the U.S. bald eagle wrapped in a banner that says "U.S. Capitol Visitor Center".

=== Half eagle ===
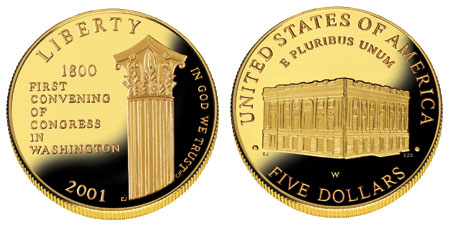
U.S. Capitol Visitor Center $5 gold half eagle obverse (left) and reverse (right)

The obverse of the U.S Capitol Visitor Center half eagle, designed by Elizabeth Jones, depicts the top of a Corinthian column and the words "First Convening of Congress in Washington". The reverse of the coin, also designed by Jones, shows the Capitol building as it appeared in 1800.

== Specifications ==
Half Dollar

- Display Box Color: Dark Blue
- Edge: Reeded
- Weight: 11.340 grams
- Diameter: 30.61 millimeters; 1.205 inches
- Composition: 92% copper; 8% nickel (Cupronickel)

Dollar

- Display Box Color: Dark Blue
- Edge: Reeded
- Weight: 26.730 grams; 0.8594 troy ounce
- Diameter: 38.10 millimeters; 1.50 inches
- Composition: 90% Silver, 10% Copper

Half Eagle

- Display Box Color: Dark Blue
- Edge: Reeded
- Weight: 8.359 grams; 0.2687 troy ounce
- Diameter: 21.59 millimeters; 0.850 inch
- Composition: 90% Gold, 3.6% Silver, 6.4% Copper

== See also ==
- United States commemorative coins
- List of United States commemorative coins and medals (2000s)
