= Library of Congress silver dollar =

2000 US commemorative coin

- United states
- Value: 1 U.S. Dollar
- Mass: 26.73 g
- Diameter: 38.1 mm
- Edge: Reeded
- Composition: 90% Ag; 10% Cu
- Years of minting: 2000

Obverse
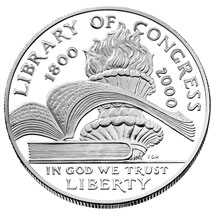
- Design: Open book superimposed over the torch of learning
- Designer: Thomas D. Rogers
- Design date: 2000

Reverse
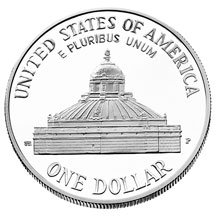
- Design: Architectural rendering of the dome on the Library of Congress' Jefferson building
- Designer: John Mercanti
- Design date: 2000

Library of Congress silver dollar is a commemorative coin issued by the United States Mint in 2000. The coin was part of a two-coin series authorized by Pub. L. 105–268 (text) (PDF) commemorating the 200th anniversary of the Library of Congress.

== Design ==
The obverse of the coin was designed by US Mint engraver Thomas D. Rogers. It features two books, one closed and one open, superimposed over the torch of learning. The reverse was designed by John Mercanti, who had designed many commemorative coins in the past, and features the dome of the Library of Congress' Thomas Jefferson Building.

== Production and sales ==
Public Law 105–268 authorized a total of 500,000 Library of Congress dollars. Sales of the coin began on April 24, 2000, and when sales ended at the end of the year, 53,264 uncirculated and 198,503 proof coins (both produced at the Philadelphia Mint) were sold.

Although more dollar coins were sold than its companion coin, the Library of Congress eagle, it was the latter that became more popular on the secondary market due to the fact that it was the first bi-metallic coin issued by the US Mint.

== See also ==
- Library of Congress bimetallic eagle
- List of United States commemorative coins and medals (2000s)
- United States commemorative coins
