= West Point Bicentennial silver dollar =

2002 United States commemorative coin

West Point Bicentennial dollar
- United states
- Value: 1 U.S. Dollar
- Mass: 26.73 g
- Diameter: 38.1 mm
- Edge: Reeded
- Composition: 90% Ag; 10% Cu
- Years of minting: 2002

Obverse
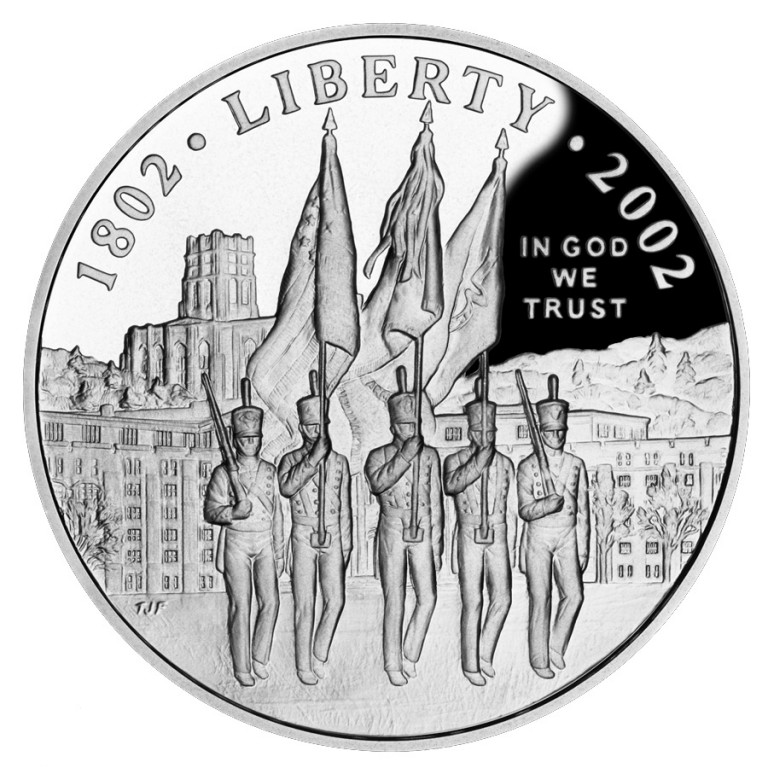
- Design: Cadet color guard in parade with the Military Academy's Washington Hall and Cadet Chapel in the background
- Designer: James Ferrell
- Design date: 2002

Reverse
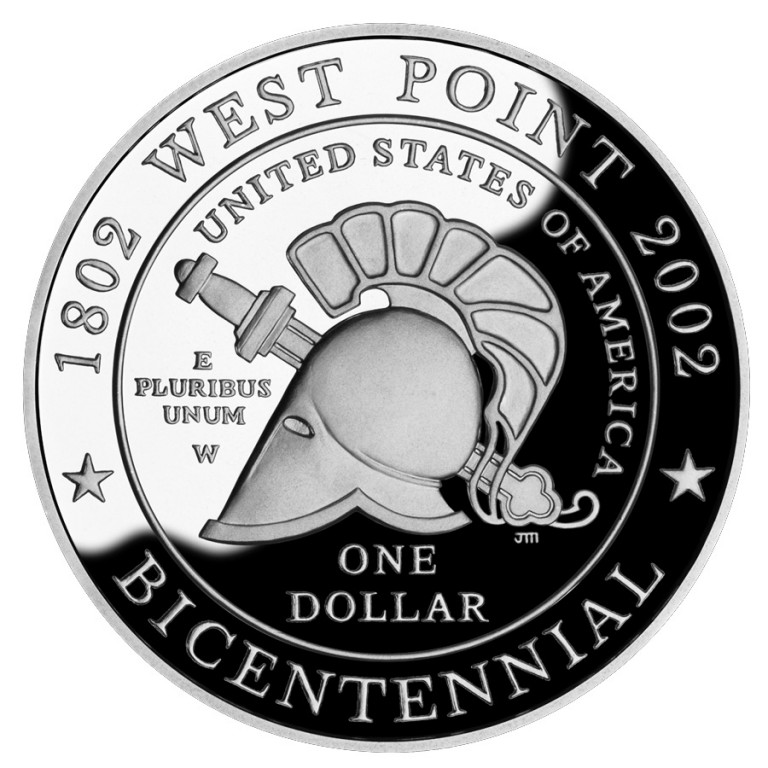
- Design: United States Military Academy Bicentennial logo
- Designer: John Mercanti
- Design date: 2002

The West Point Bicentennial silver dollar is a commemorative coin issued by the United States Mint in 2002.

== See also ==
- List of United States commemorative coins and medals (2000s)
- United States commemorative coins
