= First in Flight Centennial commemorative coins =

Series of United States commemorative coins

The First in Flight Centennial commemorative coins are a series of commemorative coins issued by the United States Mint in 2003. The coins, issued in half dollar, dollar, and eagle ($10) denominations, commemorate the 100th anniversary of the first controlled flight of a powered heavier-than-air aircraft. The coins were authorized by Public Law 105-124.

== Half dollar ==
First in Flight Centennial half dollar

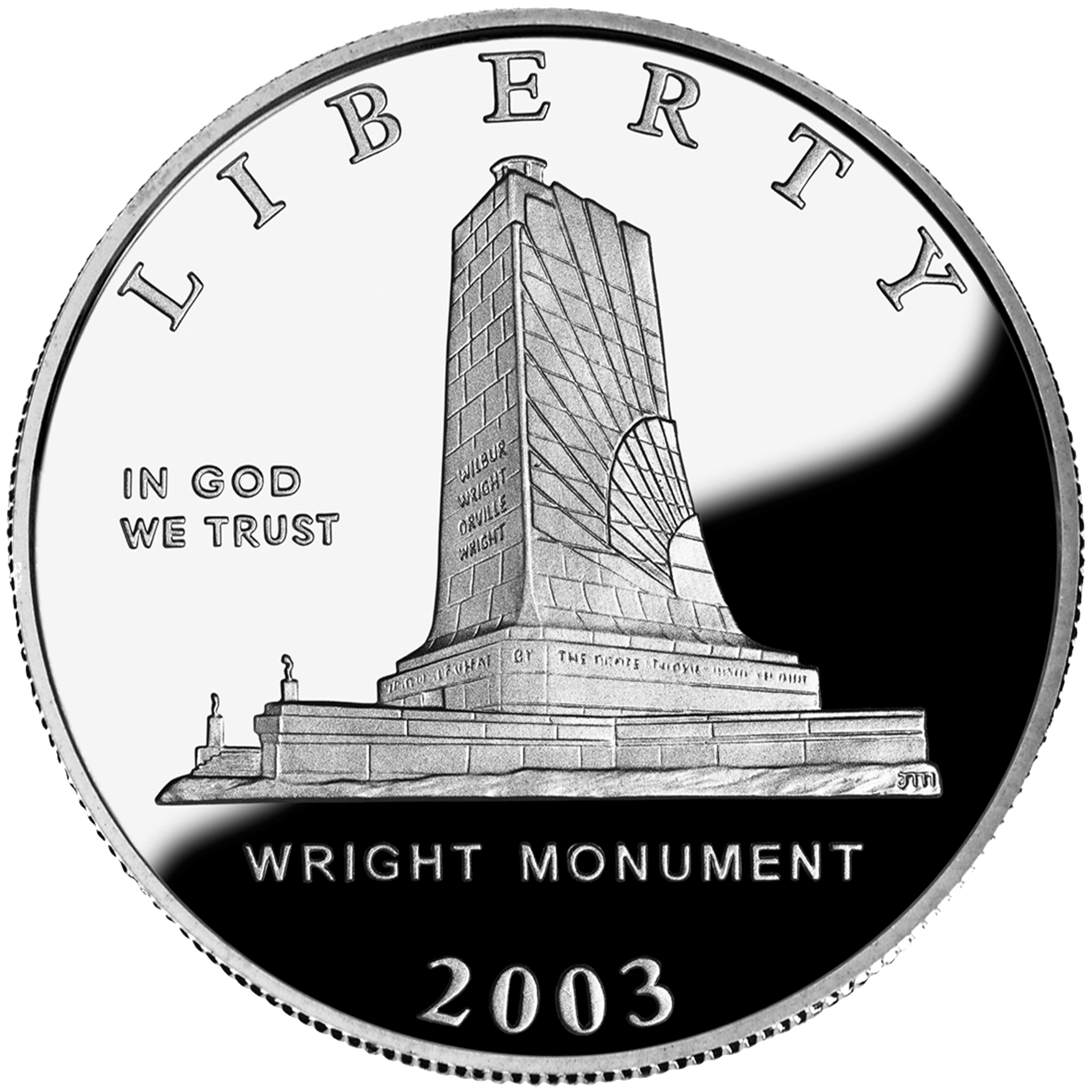
Obverse

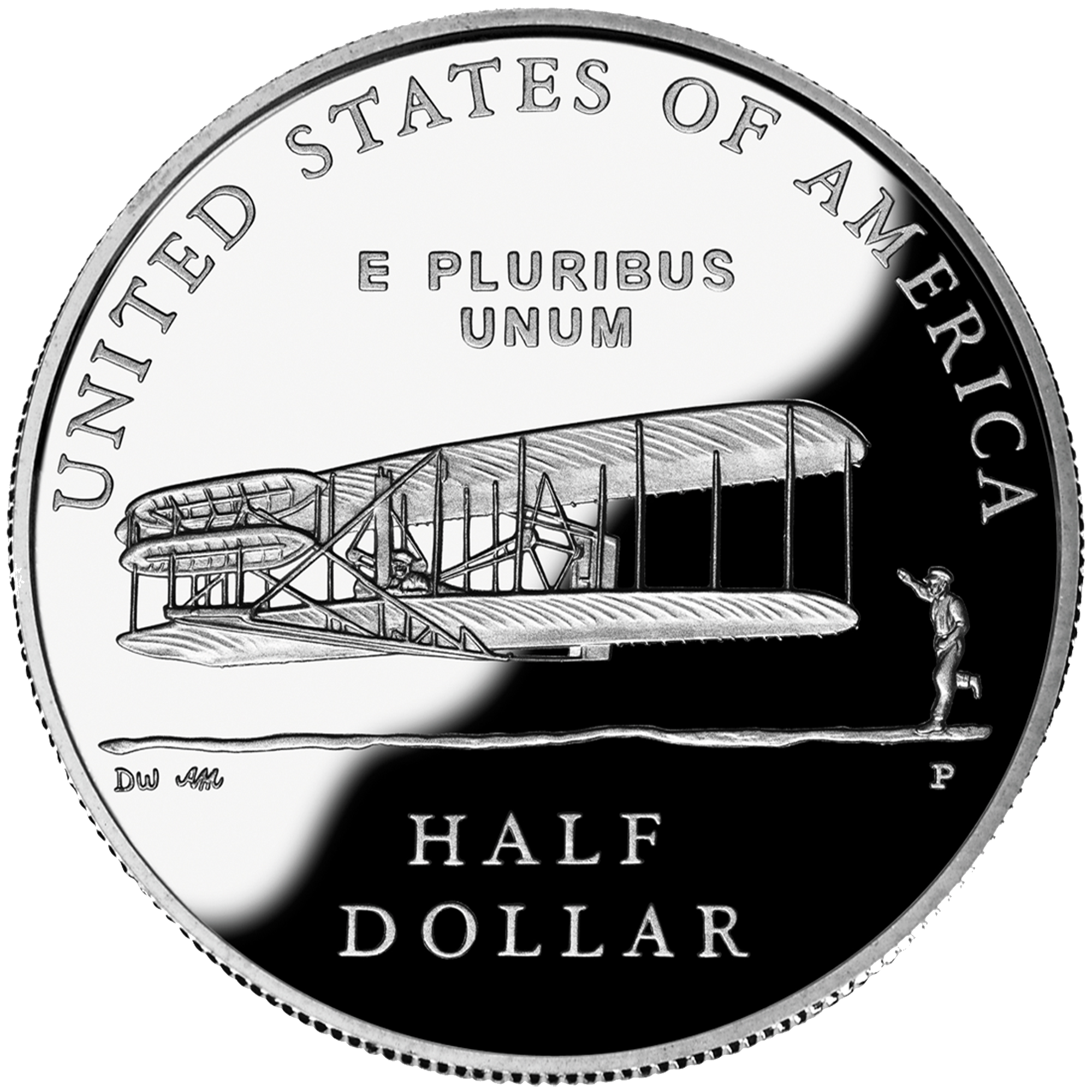
Reverse

The First In Flight half dollar was struck in the standard half dollar composition of nickel-clad copper. The obverse of the coin features the Wright Brothers Monument, while the reverse features an image of the Wright Flyer making its historic flight. 750,000 half dollars were authorized, of which 109,710 proof and 57,122 uncirculated coins were minted at the Philadelphia Mint.

== Silver dollar ==
First in Flight Centennial silver dollar

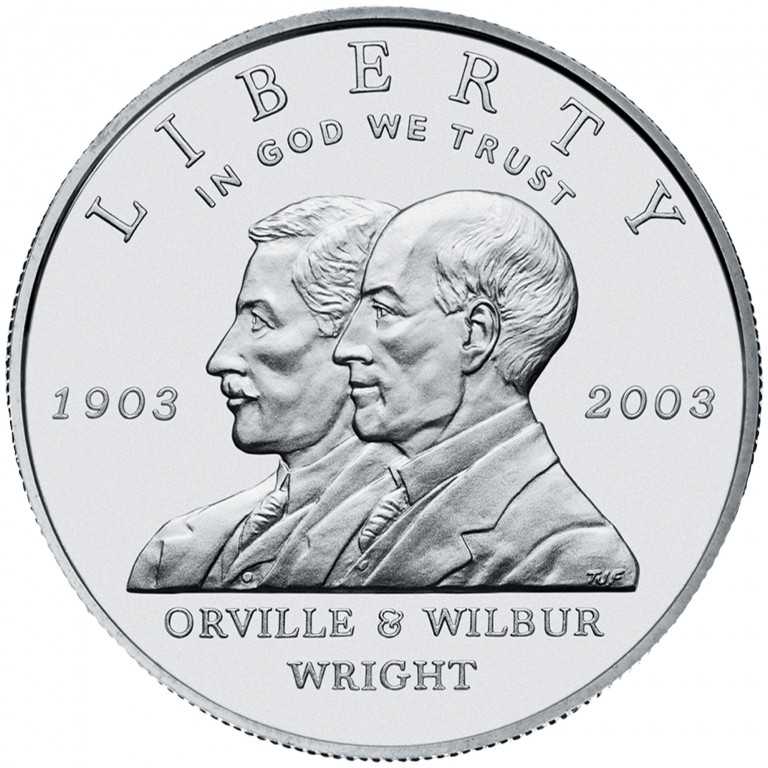
Obverse

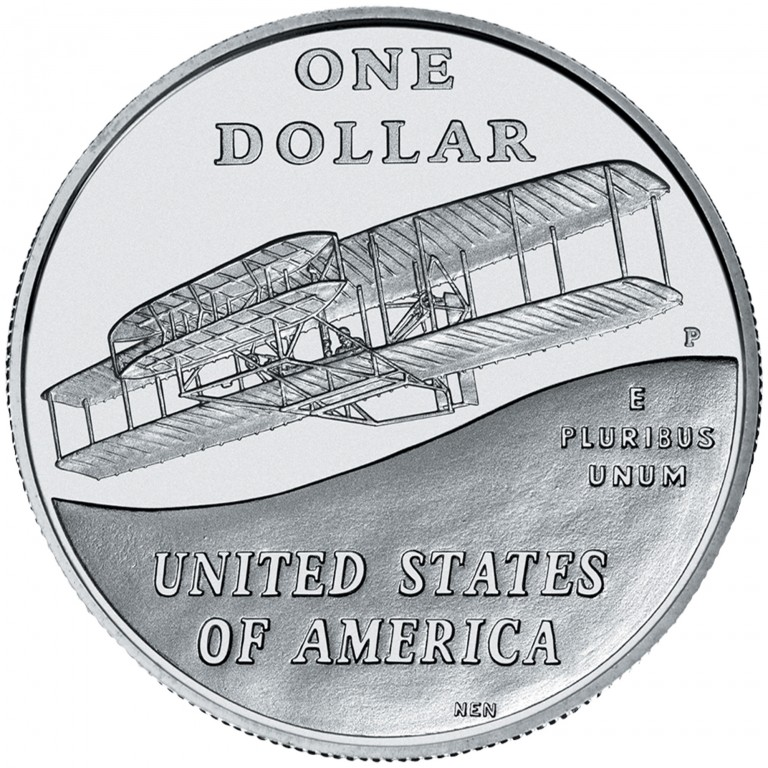
Reverse

The First in Flight dollar coin was struck in 90% silver and 10% copper, similar to the standard composition of the dollar coin up until 1935. The obverse features profiles of the Wright brothers, while the reverse features an image of the Wright Flyer over the dunes at Kill Devil Hills, North Carolina. Public Law 105-124 authorized 500,000 silver dollars, of which 190,240 proof and 53,533 uncirculated coins were produced at the Philadelphia Mint.

== Gold eagle ==
First in Flight Centennial gold eagle

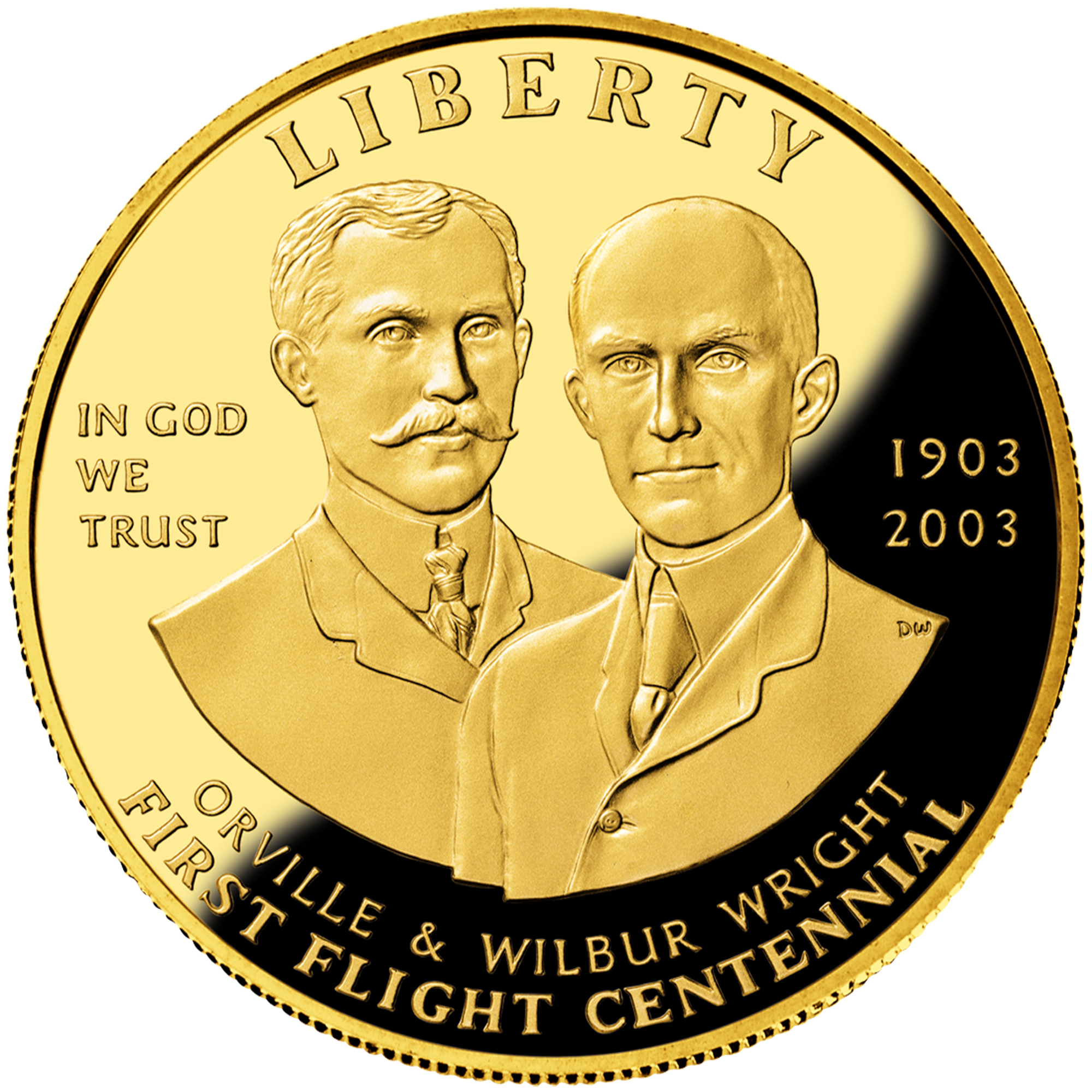
Obverse

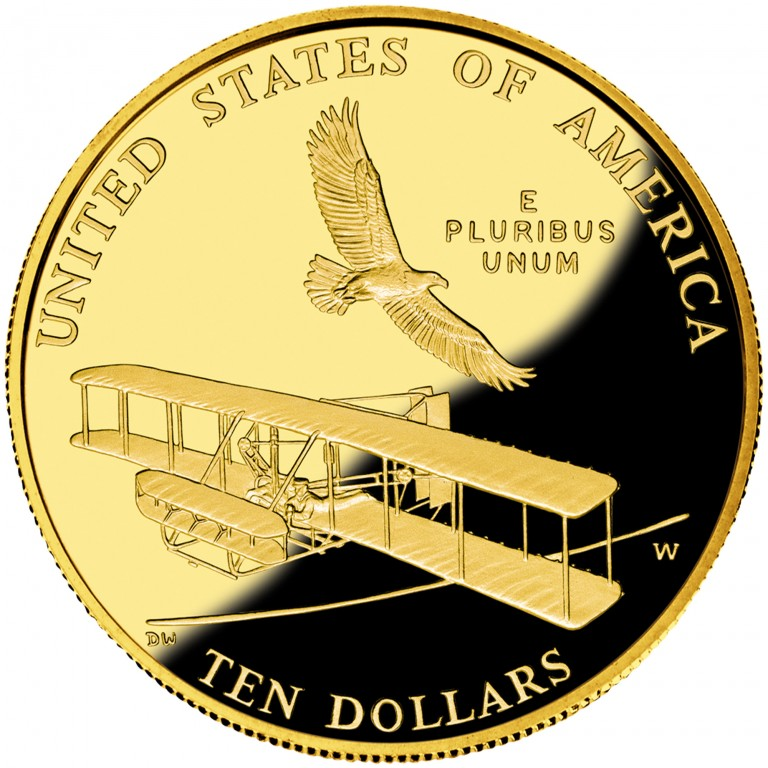
Reverse

A $10 eagle coin was also produced, with a composition of 90% gold, 6% silver, and 4% copper. This was the first time a commemorative eagle was produced with this composition since 1985, and as of 2019 was the last time a commemorative eagle was produced with this composition.^{α} The obverse features a portrait of Orville and Wilbur Wright, while the reverse features an eagle in flight above an image of the Wright Flyer. 100,000 gold eagles were authorized, of which 21,676 proof and 10,009 uncirculated coins were minted at Philadelphia.

== See also ==
- United States commemorative coins
- List of United States commemorative coins and medals (2000s)

== Notes ==
^α A commemorative eagle was issued in 2018 with a composition of 99.99% gold, and another eagle is scheduled for release in 2020 with that composition.
