= Leif Erikson Day =

Annual observance on October 9

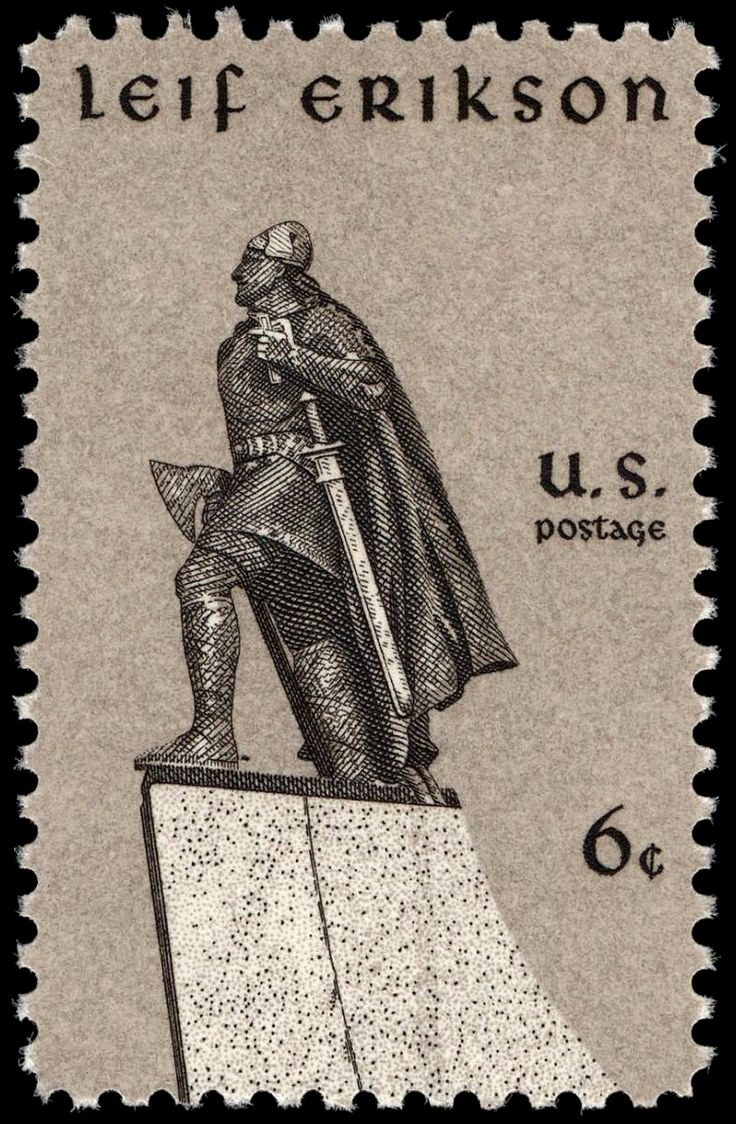
- U.S. stamp issued on Leif Erikson Day, 1968 (featuring Reykjavík's statue of Leif)
- Observed by: United States, parts of Canada
- Type: Cultural
- Significance: Celebrating Leif Erikson as the first European to lead a voyage to North America
- Date: October 9
- Next time: October 9, 2027
- Frequency: Annual
- Related to: Leif Erikson

Leif Erikson Day is an annual observance that occurs on October 9. It honors Leif Erikson (Old Norse: Leifr Eiríksson), (Note: Icelandic: Leifur Eiríksson, Norwegian: Leiv Eiriksson, Swedish: Leif Eriksson, Danish: Leif Eriksen. He is also referred to as Leif the Lucky.) the Norse explorer who, in approximately 1000 AD, led the first Europeans believed to have set foot on the continent of North America (other than Greenland).

Because the exact date of Leif's arrival to the Americas is unknown, the October 9 date was chosen in commemoration of the Restauration's arrival to New York Harbor, carrying some of the first Norwegian immigrants to the United States. This means the holiday occurs before Columbus Day (although it sometimes coincides with the US' observance of Columbus Day).

== History ==
The 1874 book America Not Discovered by Columbus by Norwegian-American Rasmus B. Anderson helped popularize the idea that Vikings were the first Europeans in the New World, an idea that was verified in 1960. In his speech during the Norse-American Centennial at the Minnesota State Fair in 1925, President Calvin Coolidge gave recognition to Leif Erikson as the discoverer of America. In 1929, Wisconsin became the first U.S. state to officially adopt Leif Erikson Day as a state holiday, thanks in large part to efforts by Rasmus Anderson. In 1931, Minnesota did also. As a result of efforts by the Leif Erikson Memorial Association of Saskatchewan, the Legislative Assembly of Saskatchewan proclaimed—through an order-in-council in 1936—that Leif Erikson Day would be observed on October 9. By 1956, Leif Erikson Day had been made an official observance in seven states (Wisconsin, Minnesota, South Dakota, Illinois, Colorado, Washington, and California) and one Canadian province (Saskatchewan).

The federal government of the United States first recognized Leif Erikson Day in 1935 as a result of House Joint Resolution 26, which had been introduced during the 74th Congress (1935–1936) by Congressman Harry Sauthoff of Wisconsin. Originally, the resolution was written to request the US president annually proclaim October 9 as Leif Erikson Day, but it was amended in committee to be for 1935 only. After passing Congress, the legislation was signed into law by President Franklin D. Roosevelt on June 19, 1935. As requested in the joint resolution, Roosevelt then issued presidential proclamation 2135 on September 11, 1935, designating October 9 of that year as Leif Erikson Day.

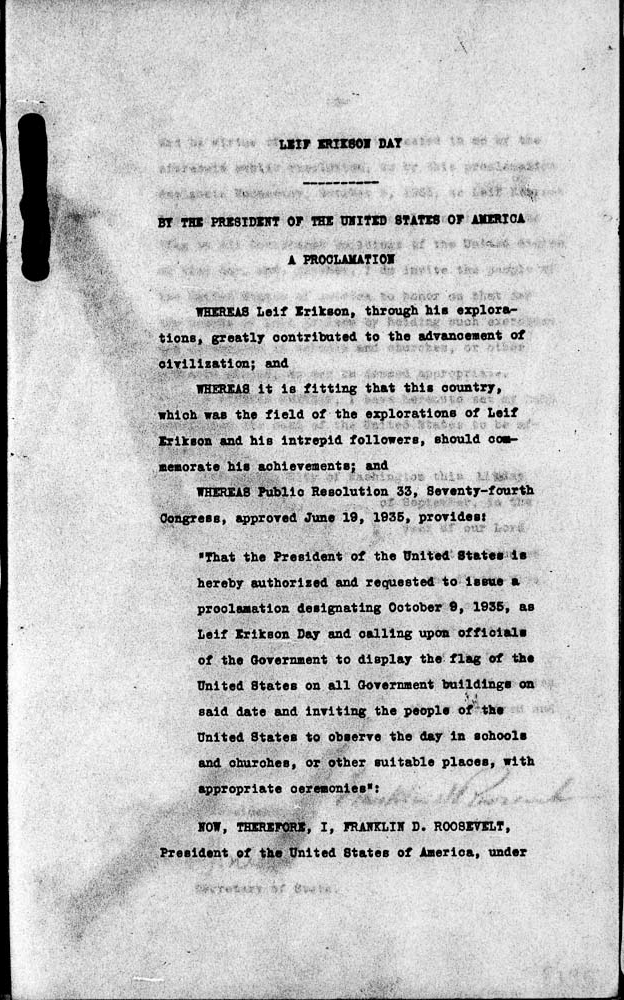
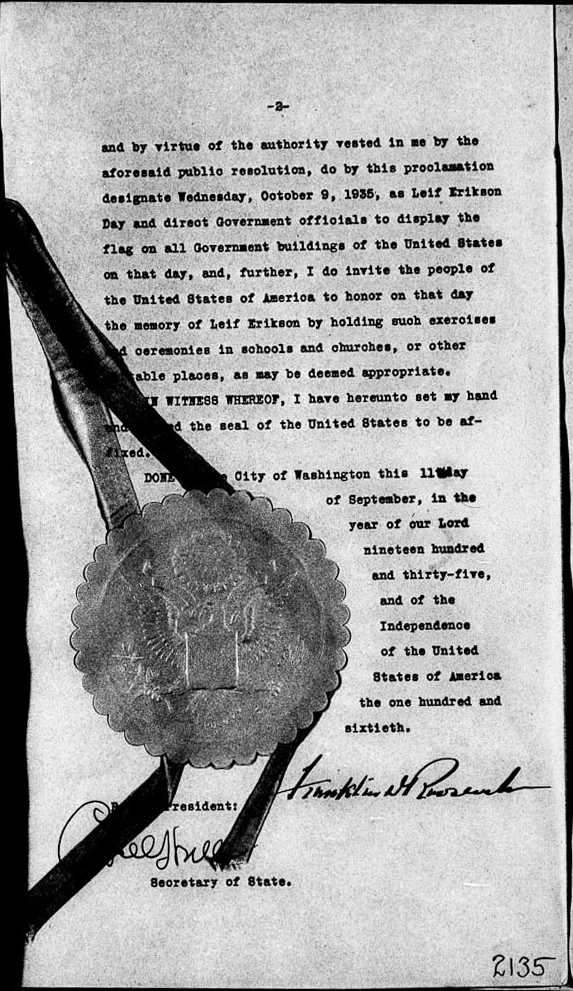
Presidential Proclamation 2135 authorized, in 1935, the first US federal observance of Leif Erikson Day. Since 1964, presidential proclamations observing the day have been issued annually.

In the following decades, several unsuccessful attempts were made to pass legislation requesting Leif Erikson Day be proclaimed annually by the president. During the 88th Congress (1963–1964), various members of Congress introduced 12 different resolutions to that effect. One of these pieces of legislation, House Joint Resolution 393 (proposed by Congressman John Blatnik of Minnesota), was passed by Congress and then signed into law by President Lyndon B. Johnson on September 2, 1964, becoming Public Law 88–566. As requested by the joint resolution, President Johnson also signed Presidential Proclamation 3610 proclaiming October 9 of that year as Leif Erikson Day. Under the 1964 joint resolution, each president in the years since has issued an annual proclamation, often using the opportunity also to praise the contributions of Americans of Nordic descent generally and the spirit of discovery.

Bills have been introduced in the Parliament of Canada to observe Leif Erikson Day throughout the country, but they have failed to pass.

== Date ==
October 9 is not associated with any particular event in Leif Erikson's life. The exact date of Leif's arrival to the Americas is unknown, but the Sagas state that it was in autumn. At the suggestion of Christian A. Hoen, October 9 was settled upon, as it took place in the fall and was already a historic date for Scandinavians in America. The date was chosen because the ship Restauration coming from Stavanger, Norway, arrived in New York Harbor on October 9, 1825, beginning a wave of immigration from Norway to the United States.

== Observance ==
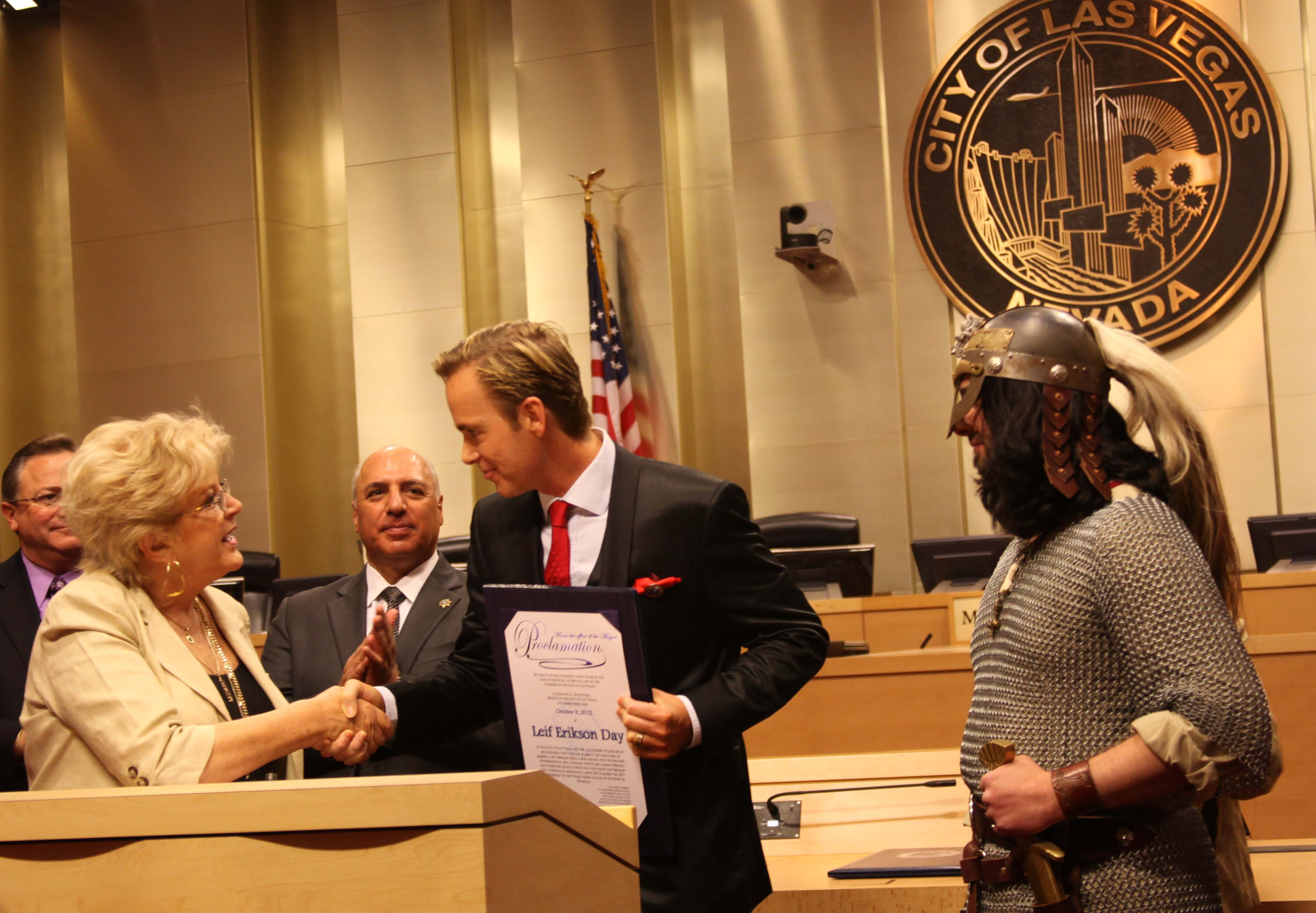
2012 Leif Erikson Day proclamation event in Las Vegas, Nevada

The federal government of the United States observes the holiday, and some U.S. states officially commemorate Leif Erikson Day. It is celebrated in many communities, particularly in the Upper Midwest and other places where large numbers of people from the Nordic countries settled. It has long been observed in Seattle, Washington. In 2012, the day was celebrated in Las Vegas, Nevada. Westby, Wisconsin, and Norway, Michigan, have held festivals near the day. There have been Canadian commemorations, including in Edmonton, Alberta, and Charlottetown, Prince Edward Island.

== In popular culture ==
The holiday was referenced in the episode "Bubble Buddy" of the Nickelodeon animated series SpongeBob SquarePants. A writer in Forbes said the holiday is often associated online with its appearance in SpongeBob SquarePants and posed "Perhaps this is the best way to remember the day". The episode is arguably responsible for popularizing the holiday outside of the Norwegian-American community.
