= Library of Congress bimetallic eagle =

Commemorative ten-dollar coin of the United States

- United States
- Value: 10 U.S. dollars
- Mass: 16.259 g (0.5227 ozt)
- Diameter: 27.00 mm
- Thickness: 2.35 mm
- Edge: Reeded
- Composition: 48% Pt (.9995 fineness); 48% Au (.900 fineness); 4% Alloy
- Years of minting: 2000
- Catalog number: KM# 312

Obverse
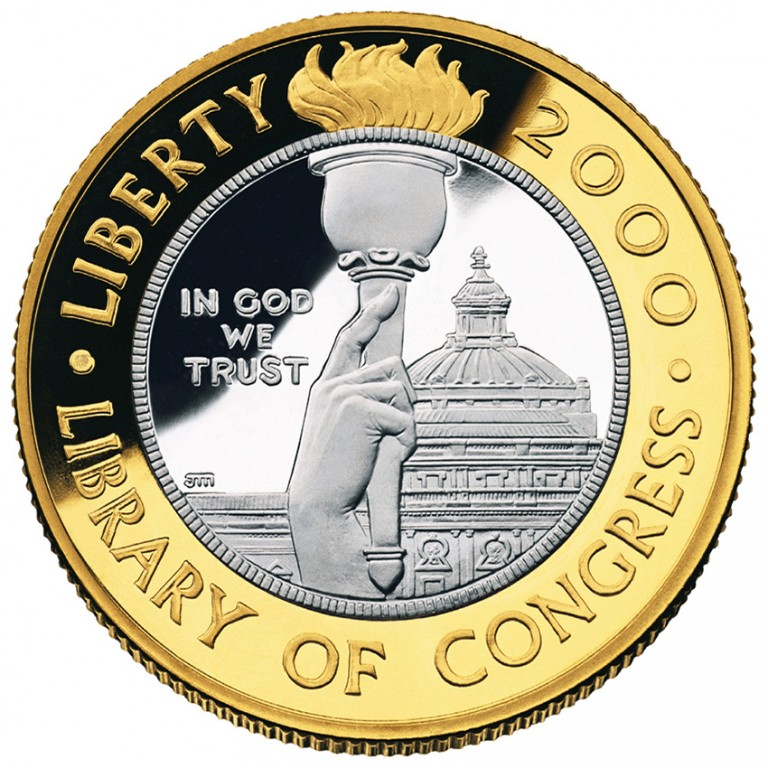
- Design: Hand of Minerva raising the torch of learning over the dome of the Jefferson building
- Designer: John Mercanti
- Design date: 1999

Reverse
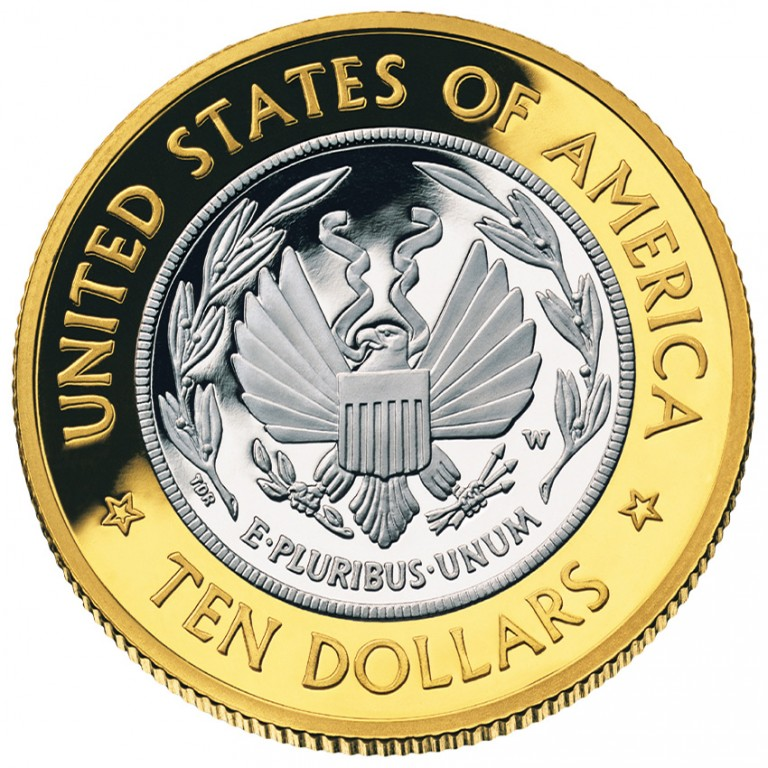
- Design: The Library of Congress seal encircled by a laurel leaf
- Designer: Thomas D. Rogers, Sr.
- Design date: 1999

The Library of Congress bimetallic eagle is a modern U.S. commemorative coin issued in the ten dollar denomination. It is the first gold and platinum bimetallic coin to be issued by the United States Mint. It was issued in proof and business strike qualities.

The issue price was $425 for the proof version and $405 for the uncirculated (business strike) version.

== Design ==
The bimetallic coin design was inspired by the graceful architecture of the library's Jefferson Building. The outer ring is stamped from a sheet of gold, then a solid core of platinum is placed within the ring. Then, the gold ring and platinum core are simultaneously stamped forming an annular bead where the two precious metals meet. The obverse depicts the hand of Minerva, the Goddess of Wisdom, raising the torch of learning aside the dome of the Thomas Jefferson Building. The coin's reverse is marked with the Library of Congress seal encircled by a laurel wreath, symbolizing its national accomplishment.

== Specifications ==
Mintage (max.): 200,000 (all options). The final mintages were 7,261 uncirculated, and 27,445 proof.

U.S. Mint Facility: West Point, NY

Public Law: 105-268

== See also ==
- United States commemorative coins
- Library of Congress silver dollar
- List of United States commemorative coins and medals (2000s)
