= Statue of Leif Erikson (Reykjavík) =

Statue in Reykjavík, Iceland

Leifr Eiricsson
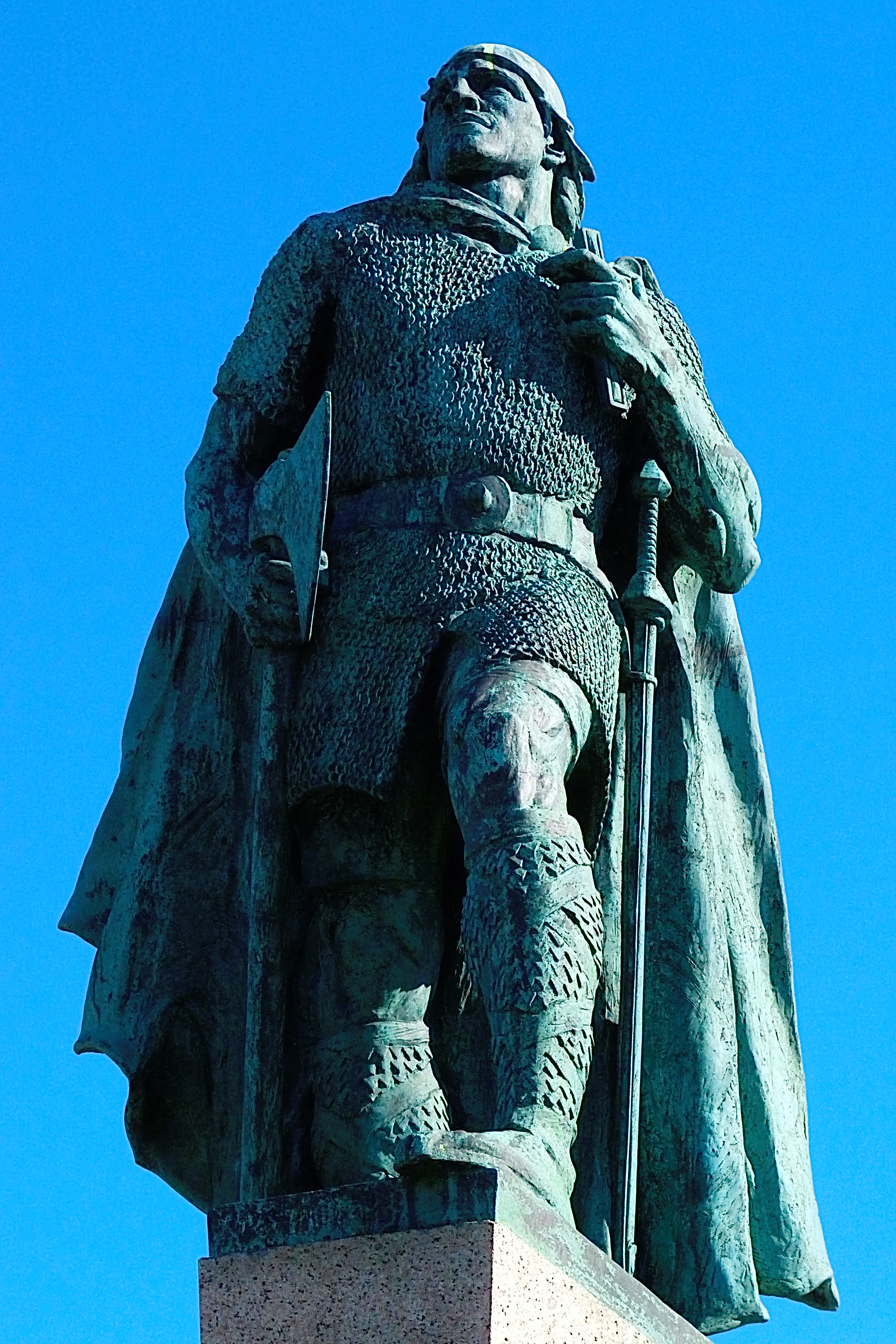
- Artist: Alexander Stirling Calder
- Year: 1929–1932
- Medium: Bronze
- Subject: Leif Erikson
- Location: Reykjavík, Iceland; 64°8′32.47″N 21°55′39.16″W

Leifr Eiricsson, sometimes called the Leif Eiricsson Memorial, is a statue of Norse explorer Leif Erikson created by American artist Alexander Stirling Calder. The artwork was commissioned by the United States government as a gift to the Icelandic people for the 1,000th anniversary of the Alþingi in 1930. The statue was unveiled on July 17, 1932, in Reykjavík, Iceland atop a hill overlooking the city.

A second casting of the statue was made for the Icelandic exhibit at the 1939 New York World's Fair; this casting currently stands at the Mariners' Museum and Park in Newport News, Virginia. The statue's plaster model is part of the Smithsonian Institution's collection.

As an iconic image of Leif, Calder's statue has inspired a number of other artworks, and its image has been reproduced on stamps, souvenirs, and so forth.

== Creation ==
In June 1930, the Icelandic government held Alþingishátíðin, a celebration of the 1,000th anniversary of Alþingi, the country's parliament. Preparatory to the celebration, the 71st United States Congress passed House Joint Resolution 2, on June 21, 1929. This legislation permitted the US government to participate in the celebration and required the government to "procure a suitable statue or other memorial of Leif Ericsson and present the same as a gift of the American people to the people of Iceland."

Later that year, the United States Commission of Fine Arts was enlisted to select a sculptor to fulfill Congress' request. The commission first selected a group of artists who were subsequently invited to submit photographs of their proposed works for final consideration. Per the Department of State, the artist was required to be a citizen of the United States. In November 1929, the photographs were inspected and Alexander Stirling Calder was recommended by the commission to the Department of State as the artist to be hired.

Calder's completed statue was accepted by the commission in January 1932. During the course of its design, Calder had completed three preliminary sketches and studies.

== Reykjavík casting ==
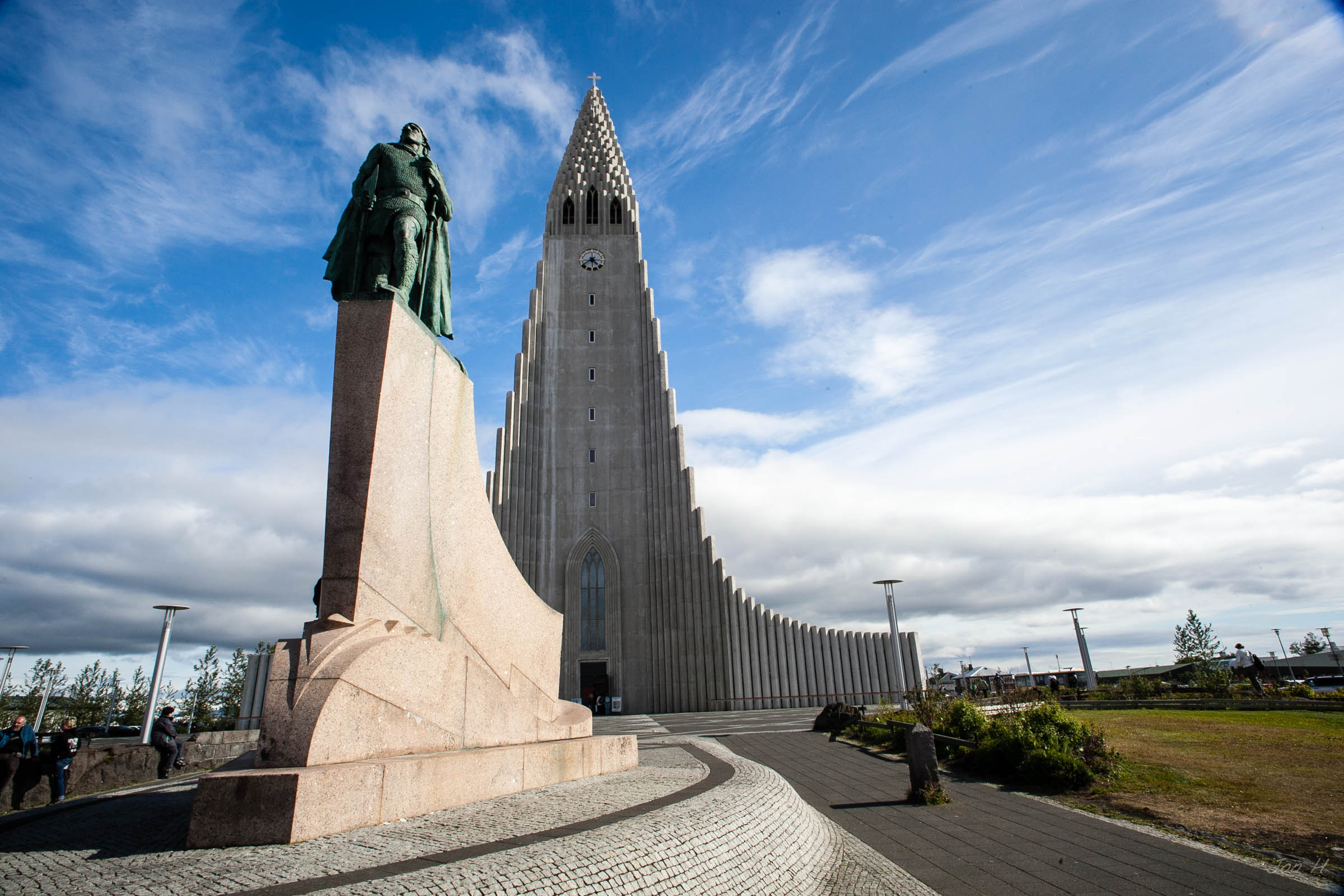
Leifr Eiricsson with Hallgrímskirkja in the background

After being shipped to Iceland, the statue was placed on its pedestal on May 2, 1932. The location chosen for the artwork was atop a prominent hill named Skólavörðuholt, where stood a historic tower called Skólavarðan, which had to be demolished to build the monument.

The statue was officially unveiled in a ceremony on Sunday, July 17, 1932. The ceremony was presided over by the Icelandic prime minister, Ásgeir Ásgeirsson, and also included speeches by Frederick W. B. Coleman, US envoy to Denmark (Iceland was still in a personal union with Denmark at the time), and Knud Ziemsen, the mayor of Reykjavík.

The stone pedestal has the form of the prow of a Viking ship and contains an inscription about the gifting of the statue by the United States. It was constructed of Texas red granite, is 15 feet (4.6 m) high, and was manufactured by the Presbrey-Leland company of Brattleboro, Vermont. It was erected in the fall of 1931, several months before the statue was placed.

Icelanders interpreted the gift as acknowledgement by the US that Leif was Icelandic, and appreciated the gesture, as many Norwegians, and especially Norwegian Americans, claimed Leif as their countryman.

The bronze statue underwent what was likely its first cleaning and maintenance in April 2025, during which the Reykjavik Art Museum indicated it would then wax the artwork regularly to protect it.

=== Inscription ===
While the statue and pedestal were being created, some controversy arose regarding the spelling of Leif Erikson's name. Specifically how the Old Norse "Leifr Eiríksson" should be modernized for inscription on the pedestal, as the different Nordic countries use different spellings of the name, and there are multiple different anglicized versions as well. After consulting with Sveinbjörn Johnson, an Icelandic-born law professor at the University of Illinois Urbana-Champaign, "Leifr Eiricsson" was decided upon. The inscription reads:

Leifr Eiricsson
Son of Iceland
Discoverer of Vinland
The United States of America to the people of Iceland
on the one thousandth anniversary of the Althing
A D 1930

== Other castings ==
After the Reykjavík statue was cast, the plaster model became part of the Smithsonian Institution's collection. And has, at least once, been on display in the National Museum of Natural History.

=== Mariners' Museum ===
Casting at the Mariners' Museum and Park, Newport News, Virginia

In the 1930s, the Ericsson Memorial Committee of the United States (a subcommittee of the Icelandic National League) was granted permission to use the plaster model to have a second casting of the statue made, this time for use by the Icelandic government at the 1939 New York World's Fair. This second casting stood next to one of two entrances to Iceland's exhibit at the Hall of Nations for the duration of the fair (with a casting of the statue of Thorfinn Karlsefni by Einar Jónsson at the other entrance).

Following the fair, the Mariners' Museum and Park in Newport News, Virginia volunteered to display the statue until a permanent location for the work could be found. During the 84th Congress, legislation was passed allowing the US government to accept the statue and erect it in Washington, D.C. The plan fell through, and in 1963, the Mariners' Museum was informed it could keep the statue indefinitely.

== In popular culture ==
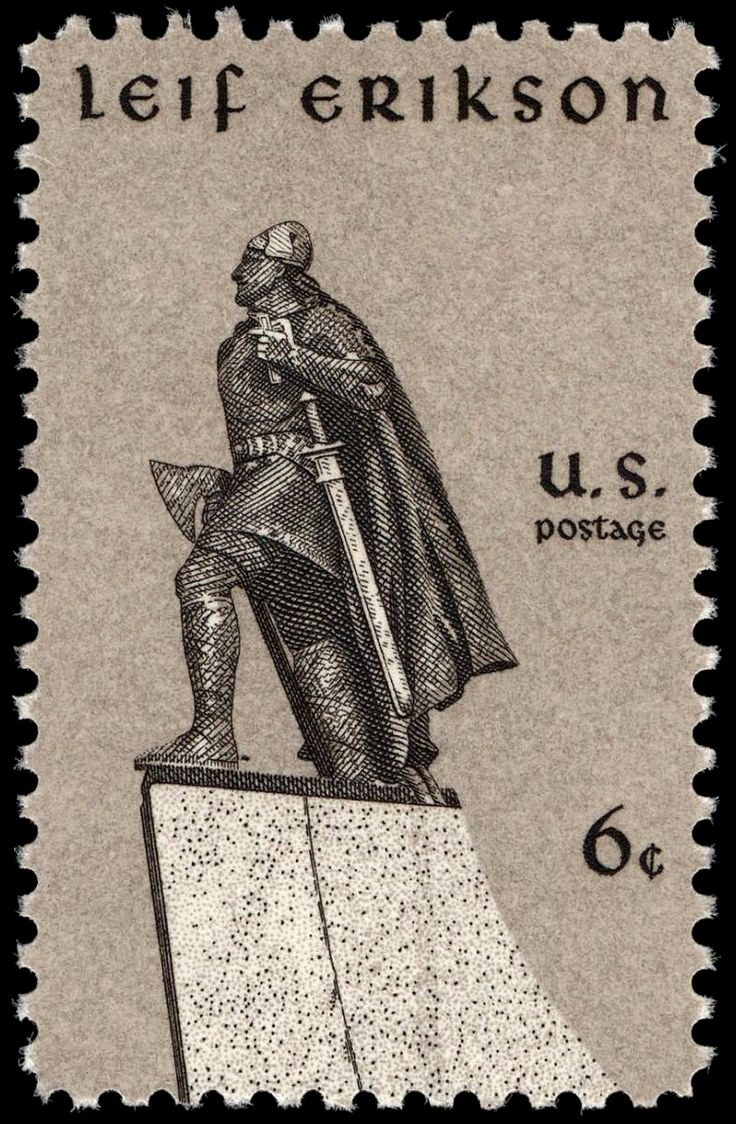
Stamp issued in the United States on Leif Erikson Day (October 9) 1968

Calder's statue is an iconic image of Leif, and has been used extensively to illustrate the explorer in various media, on souvenirs, stamps, coins, and so forth.

On Leif Erikson Day 1938, Iceland's postal service released three Leif Erikson themed stamps, two of which featured images of the statue in Reykjavík. On Leif Erikson Day 1968, the United States Postal Service released a stamp with an image of the statue.

During 2000, international celebrations were held to celebrate the approximate millennial anniversary of Leif's voyage to Vinland. In honor of the anniversary, Íslandspóstur released a set of four "Discovery of America" themed stamps on March 16, 2000, one of which featured an image of Calder's statue. Also released by the Icelandic government that year was a Silver 1,000 Kronur coin featuring an "interpretation" of the statue on its obverse.

A bas-relief, featuring a version of Calder's statue by artist Ívar Valgarðsson, was unveiled in the new Leifur Eiriksson Air Terminal at its opening at Keflavík International Airport in 1987. A second casting of this bas-relief was unveiled on May 20, 2015, in the Quebec City River Terminal in Quebec City, Canada.
