= Leif Ericson Millennium commemorative coins =

Series of American and Icelandic commemorative coins

- United States/Iceland
- Value: 1 US dollar / 1,000 Icelandic króna
- Diameter: 38.1 mm (1.500 in) mm
- Edge: Reeded
- Composition: 90% Ag, 10% Cu
- Years of minting: 2000

Obverse

Reverse

The Leif Ericson Millennium commemorative coins are a series of coins issued in 2000 by the United States Mint to commemorate the 1,000th anniversary of Leif Ericson's discovery of the Americas.

== United States coin ==
One of the two coins of the series was a silver one dollar coin. The obverse features a portrait of Leif Ericson, designed by John Mercanti. The reverse features Ericson's ship, designed by T. James Ferrell. Of the 500,000 coins authorized, the Philadelphia Mint struck 28,150 uncirculated and 58,612 proof coins.

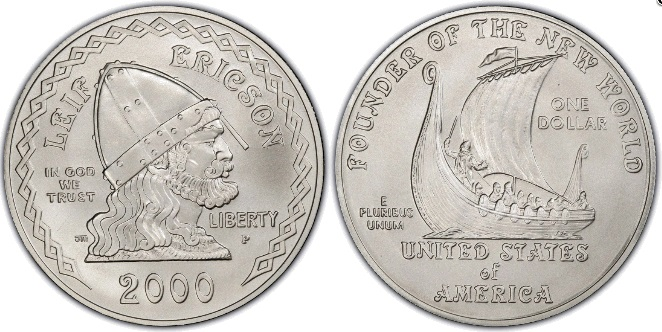
Uncirculated Leif Ericson dollar

== Icelandic coin ==
The other coin had the same composition and specifications as the silver dollar, but was denominated in 1,000 Icelandic króna. The obverse features an image of Stirling Calder’s sculpture of Leif Ericson, while the reverse features an eagle, a dragon, a bull and the giant from the Icelandic Coat of Arms. Both sides of the coin were designed by Throstur Magnusson. A maximum mintage of 150,000 coins was authorized, of which 15,947 were produced at the Philadelphia Mint (all with a proof finish without a mintmark).

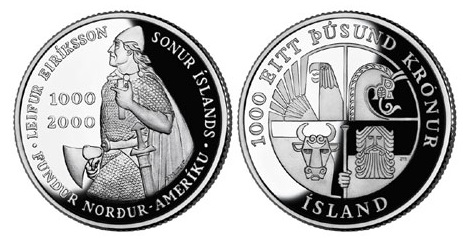
Leif Ericson 1,000 króna coin

== See also ==
- United States commemorative coins
- List of United States commemorative coins and medals (2000s)
- Icelandic króna
