= Joel Iskowitz =

American illustrator and designer

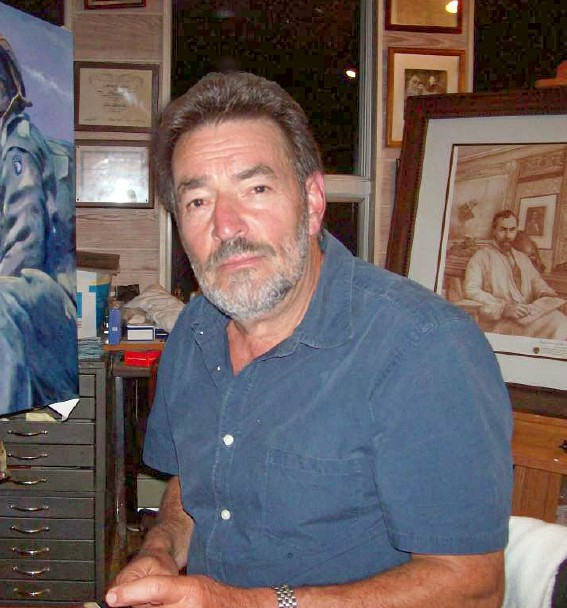
- Iskowitz in his studio in 2010
- Born: August 15, 1946; The Bronx, New York, U.S.
- Died: April 23, 2026 (aged 79)
- Education: BFA, Hunter College, 1968
- Known for: Illustration: philatelic, numismatic
- Website: Creativeshake

Joel Iskowitz (August 15, 1946-April 23, 2026) was an American designer, book illustrator, print artist and stamp, coin and medal designer. From an initial interest in medical illustration, this graphic artist has branched to other fields. He specializes in highly realistic art resulting from extensive research to make his designs as accurate as possible. His philatelic (stamp) designs, he once said, "must be super accurate and well documented, for if you get so much as an animal's tuft of fur out of place on a philatelic design you will hear from someone critical of your design." Among his coin designs are the reverse of the 2009 Lincoln Bicentennial penny (3rd of 4: Professional Life in Illinois), 2008 Arizona State Quarter, 2009 District of Columbia Quarter, and the 2016 Nancy Reagan First Spouse Gold Coin. In 2011 he was inducted into the Hunter College Hall of Fame. A major address on his career as a designer of commemorative coins and medals, at the Museum of American Finance in October 2015, was aired on C-SPAN.

== Education and early career ==
Iskowitz graduated from New York's High School of Music and Art in 1964. He received his Bachelor of Fine Arts (BFA) from Hunter College in 1968, and attended a summer session on a scholarship at Yale his junior year. He enrolled in several other fine arts courses, but found the instructors were more interested in abstract art rather than the traditional, realistic art he wanted to pursue. He eventually took a teaching course, allowing him to teach in New York City schools as a substitute teacher in math and art from 1970 to 1977.

After a year on the West Coast as a portrait artist in San Francisco, he returned to New York City to work in the music industry designing album covers. He found illustration work submitting freelance line drawings which were visual reviews of new albums to the rock music publication, Changes. This led to book and cover illustrations for young adult and romance books; though highly realistic, he called these historical romances "glorified Hollywood clinch scenes."

== Transition to coins and medals ==
The research necessary to create believable period pieces helped prepare him for the exacting reference needed for his future philatelic and numismatic (coins and medals) works. He was exposed to etching and engraving while enrolled at Hunter College in 1964–1968, studying under Richard Claude Ziemann for whom he later served as an apprentice. This experience in printmaking was formative in developing his "gravure" style which he has used in many of his stamp and coin designs.

Each of these required that extra research effort, frequenting the New York Public Library as well as the scientific and historical archives. A bibliophile, Iskowitz also claims "Many hours were happily spent searching through the miles of books at Strand book store in lower Manhattan."

In 2005 he applied for the United States Mint Artistic Infusion Program, applying on the last day, and won immediate acceptance, with which he is still associated. While working with the U.S. Mint, his 18 designs have been accepted for new coins and medals.

Iskowitz's work has been featured in many international journals; including profiles of his numismatic and philatelic art in COINage Magazine; Watercolor Magazine American, American Artist Magazine, Smithsonian Profiles; and his murals have been featured in Exhibit Builder Magazine. He was inducted into the Hunter College Hall of Fame in 2011.

In October 2015 he spoke at New York City's Museum of American Finance located on Wall Street, on "Designing Congressional Gold Medals: An Artist's Perspective". This talk, featured on C-SPAN, was part of the fifth annual Wall Street Collector's Bourse, and detailed his career evolution from medical illustration to designing Congressional Gold Medals and commemorative coins.

== Corporate work ==
He has been awarded both bronze and silver medals for his corporate illustrations and grand-scale public art in Portfolios.com international competitions. Most recently his design for the American Numismatic Association's Presidential Award won the 2008 silver medal in corporate illustration in the International Creative Shake competition.

Iskowitz also creates artwork commemorating significant historical events. His most recent effort, published in lithograph by Signature Art Medals, depicts the 1908 sitting of Theodore Roosevelt for his obverse portrait on the Panama Canal Service Medal. Medalist Victor David Brenner is shown sketching the president in preparation for his models. It is widely believed that while sitting for Brenner, Roosevelt saw one of Brenner's Lincoln plaques and was inspired to have Brenner design the new Lincoln Cent, first released in 1909.

== Philatelic work ==
Iskowitz has created over 2000 stamps for 40 separate nations. He has also received the National Oceanic and Philatelic Society citation for his contributions to Space Philately.

His experience at Hunter College with Ziemann and printmaking was formative in developing his "gravure" style which he employed in many of his stamp designs. His first philatelic (stamp) commission was to create a stamp series depicting endangered species sponsored by the World Wildlife Fund for Sierra Leone that featured a family of chimps.

Since that first stamp issue in 1977 his philatelic work continues to the present day, covering a wide variety of subject matter from flora and fauna to notable personages from heads of state to film stars. He has been noted for his work depicting the British Royal Family in commemorations, jubilees and festive occasions.

== United States Air Force and NASA artwork ==
As an active United States Air Force (USAF) artist, a number of his oils are in the USAF permanent collection.

His painting documenting D-Day events is represented in the permanent collection of the Historical Association of Carentan in Normandy, France. A recently completed mural which chronicles the history of aviation technology has been installed at Wright-Patterson AFB.

Iskowitz's most recent D-Day painting completed is "Filthy Thirteen", an oil painting depicting a paratroop unit called the Filthy Thirteen, part of the 101st Airborne Division in Europe during World War II. Inclusion is this elite team meant parachuting behind enemy lines during the Allied retaking of Europe in 1944 in order to attack key targets. It has been suggested that this unit was the inspiration for "The Dirty Dozen", a movie depicting a similar military unit in World War II. The movie differs in many respects however; in the movie the team is selected from convicts.

Iskowitz has been invited twice to document Space Shuttle missions and his artwork is on permanent display at the NASA Kennedy Space Center Museum.

== United States Mint work ==
Iskowitz has an extensive portfolio of designs which the U.S. Mint has produced into coins and medals. As of 2016, the mint has accepted more than 50 of his designs.

His recent work includes design of the obverse of the New York Medal honoring the fallen of September 11, one of three Congressional Gold Medals awarded to the Fallen Heroes of September 11, 2001, on September 11, 2014, in accordance with the authorizing legislation, Public Law 112–76, the Fallen Heroes of 9/11 Act.

The reverse design for the Dolley Madison First Spouse Gold Coin was created by Iskowitz and was displayed in the East Room of the White House for the release ceremony which the artist attended. His design for the District of Columbia quarter dollar reverse was displayed at the Smithsonian Institution’s National Museum of American History.

In September 2010 the U.S. Mint announced the designs for a series of commemorative coins to be issued in 2011 to honor the 150th anniversary of the establishment of the Medal of Honor; the reverse side of the Gold coin was designed by Iskowitz.

His design for the reverse of the U.S. Mint's 2016 Nancy Reagan First Spouse Gold Coin, honoring her signature "Just Say No" initiative, was unveiled at ceremonies at the Reagan Library in February 2016.

=== 2009 Lincoln bicentennial penny ===
Four new Lincoln pennies were released to honor the 2009 bicentennial of Abraham Lincoln's birth. Iskowitz's design for the reverse of the "Professional Life in Illinois" 2009 Abraham Lincoln Bicentennial Cent is displayed in the Abraham Lincoln Presidential Museum and the Lincoln home National Historic Site. Iskowitz was invited to speak there at the ceremony for the debut of the "Illinois" Lincoln Cent.

His original design called for Lincoln to be "holding a rolled up piece of paper... as I imagined he might have held onto his words", but perhaps for "coinability" reasons - potential production difficulties - he was asked to remove the paper and the minted coin has Lincoln standing and gesticulating with one hand behind his back. Iskowitz said having his Lincoln penny design chosen is the "biggest honor" of his career.

Iskowitz died on April 23, 2026.

=== Design portfolio ===
==== Coins ====
- 2021 100th Anniversary Morgan Silver Dollar Tribute
- 2019 America the Beautiful Quarters® Program – Lowell National Historical Park - reverse
- 2019 America the Beautiful Quarters® Program – War in the Pacific National Historical Park - reverse
- 2016 America the Beautiful Quarters® Program – Theodore Roosevelt National Park - reverse
- 2015 American Eagle Platinum Proof Coin Program – reverse
- 2015 U.S. Marshals Service 225th Anniversary Commemorative Coin Program – Clad obverse
- 2015 America the Beautiful Quarters® Program – Bombay Hook National Wildlife Refuge - reverse
- 2015 First Spouse Gold Coin and Medal Program – Elizabeth Truman - obverse
- 2015 First Spouse Gold Coin and Medal Program – Elizabeth Truman - reverse
- 2015 First Spouse Gold Coin and Medal Program – Grace Coolidge - obverse
- 2015 Queen Elizabeth II portrait for coinage of Tristan da Cunha, developed for the Commonwealth Mint, UK
- 2014 America the Beautiful Quarters® Program – Everglades National Park - reverse
- 2014 First Spouse Gold Coin and Medal Program – Edith Roosevelt - obverse
- 2013 American Eagle Platinum Proof Coin Program – reverse
- 2012 Star-Spangled Banner Commemorative Coin Program – Silver obverse
- 2012 National Infantry Museum and Soldier Center Silver Dollar Commemorative Coin Program - obverse
- 2012 First Spouse Gold Coin and Medal Program – Frances Cleveland (term 1)- obverse
- 2011 American Eagle Platinum - reverse
- 2011 Medal of Honor Commemorative Gold Coin - reverse
- 2011 First Spouse Gold Coin and Medal Program – Eliza Johnson obverse
- 2010 First Spouse Mary Todd Lincoln - reverse
- 2010 WASP Congressional Medal
- 2009 Lincoln Bicentennial Cent reverse, "Professional Life in Illinois" (3rd aspect)
- 2009 First Spouse Julia Tyler- reverse
- 2009 First Spouse Julia Tyler -obverse
- 2009 District of Columbia Quarter - reverse
- 2009 Louis Braille Commemorative Silver - obverse
- 2008 American Eagle Platinum - reverse (Judicial Branch)
- 2008 Presidential $1 Andrew Jackson - obverse
- 2008 Presidential $1 Martin Van Buren - obverse
- 2008 First Spouse Elizabeth Monroe - obverse
- 2008 Bald Eagle Commemorative Silver Dollar - obverse
- 2008 Arizona Quarter - reverse
- 2007 First Spouse Dolley Madison - reverse
- 2007 Presidential $1 John Adams - obverse
- 2007 Presidential $1 James Madison - obverse
- 2006 American Eagle Platinum (Legislative Branch) - reverse

==== Medals ====
- Monuments Men Bronze Medal Program – obverse
- American Fighter Aces Bronze Medal Program – obverse
- First Special Service Force Bronze Medal Program – obverse
- 2011 Fallen Heroes of 9/11 Bronze Medal Program – New York obverse
- Woman Airforce Service Pilots (WASP) Congressional Medal Program – obverse
- Code Talkers Recognition Congressional Medals Program – Fort Peck Assiniboine and Sioux Tribes - reverse
- Code Talkers Recognition Congressional Medals Program – Hopi Tribe - obverse
- Code Talkers Recognition Congressional Medals Program – Hopi Tribe - reverse
- Code Talkers Recognition Congressional Medals Program – Ponca Tribe - obverse
- Code Talkers Recognition Congressional Medals Program – Ponca Tribe - reverse
- Code Talkers Recognition Congressional Medals Program – Seminole Nation - obverse
- Code Talkers Recognition Congressional Medals Program – Tonto Apache Tribe - obverse
- New Frontier Congressional Medal Program – obverse
- New Frontier Congressional Medal Program – reverse
- The Nisei Soldiers of World War II Congressional Medal Program – obverse

== Affiliations ==
The Abraham Lincoln Association (honorary)
The American Medallic Sculpture Association (AMSA)
The American Numismatic Association (ANA)
The American Numismatic Society (ANS)
Fédération Internationale de la Médaille d'Art (FIDEM)
Illustrators Partnership of America
New York Numismatic Club
Society of Illustrators

== Awards ==
- Portfolios.com Award
- New York Festivals
- NOAA Space Philately Award
- 17 winning (minted) United States coin designs
- 8 USAF citations
- COTY awards: The United States nominee for 2008, Most Artistic Design
- NEA Designated Master Designer, US Mint
- UK's Stamp of the Month
- Hunter College Hall of Fame
