= Artistic Infusion Program =

The Artistic Infusion Program (AIP) is a program of the United States Mint, established in 2003, which invites American artists to create designs for U.S. coins and medals, most notably the 50 State, DC and US Territories, and America the Beautiful quarters. The goal of the AIP is to enrich and diversify the design of United States coins and medals by contracting a collection of artists with varying artistic skills and talents. The program was created after some entries in the 50 State quarters series were described as being of poor quality, with a Mint spokesperson saying the AIP would ensure "excellence in design". Unlike most coin designs made by the US Mint, coin designs from the AIP are often copyrighted, because they are created by external contractors whose rights were transferred to the US Mint rather than the United States government.

== Coin designs ==
- Lincoln Union Shield cent, reverse only
- Jefferson nickel (2006–present), obverse only
- 50 State quarters, reverse only
- District of Columbia and United States Territories quarters, reverse only
- Native American dollars, reverse only
- American Innovation dollars, both obverse and reverse
- American Platinum Eagle, proof reverse only
- Most Modern United States commemorative coins
