= Uncirculated coin =

High quality coin minted for collectors

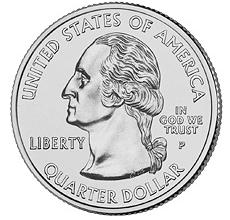
Obverse of an uncirculated 50 State quarter

The term uncirculated coin can refer to three things:

- A coin that is released to the public but not intended for general circulation (i.e. not used as money although it is still legal tender) but is available through a mint or through a local coin dealer.

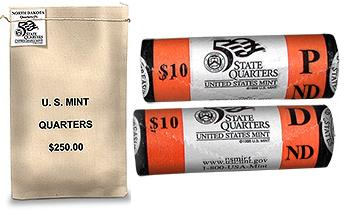
A bag of 1,000 uncirculated US quarters and two $10 rolls containing 40 quarters.

- A coin that has been graded as 60+ on the Sheldon or European grading systems.
- The process by which a coin is made. The US Mint uses this definition for the coins in the uncirculated coin set that it sells. For these coins, adjustments are made to the minting process which result in a more proof-like finish. These include using a higher force during coining, the use of fresh dies, and special cleaning.

== See also ==
- Proof coinage
