= Connecticut Tercentenary half dollar =

US commemorative 50-cent coin

- United States
- Value: 50 cents (0.50 US dollars)
- Mass: 12.5 g
- Diameter: 30.61 mm (1.20 in)
- Thickness: 2.15 mm (0.08 in)
- Edge: Reeded
- Composition: 90.0% silver; 10.0% copper
- Silver: 0.36169 troy oz
- Years of minting: 1935
- Mintage: 25,018 including 18 pieces for the Assay Commission
- Mint marks: None, all pieces struck at the Philadelphia Mint without mint mark

Obverse
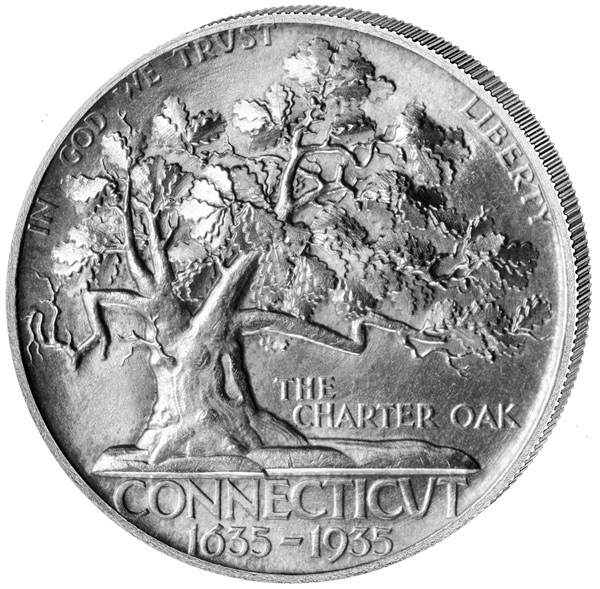
- Design: Charter Oak
- Designer: Henry Kreis
- Design date: 1935

Reverse
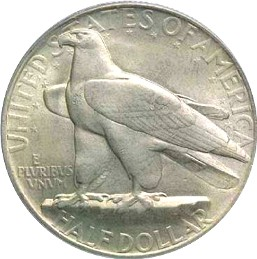
- Design: Eagle
- Designer: Henry Kreis
- Design date: 1935

The Connecticut Tercentenary half dollar, sometimes called the Connecticut half dollar, is a commemorative 50-cent piece struck by the United States Bureau of the Mint in 1935. The coin was designed by Henry Kreis and commemorates the 300th anniversary of the founding of Connecticut. Its obverse depicts the Charter Oak, where according to legend Connecticut's charter was hidden to save it from being confiscated by the English governor-general. An eagle appears on the coin's reverse side.

The Connecticut Tercentenary Commission wanted a half dollar issued, with proceeds from its sale to further its projects. A bill passed through Congress without dissent and became law on June 21, 1934, when President Franklin D. Roosevelt signed it, providing for 25,000 half dollars. Kreis's design was a Public Works Administration project and technically in violation of the new law, which said the federal government was not to pay for its design. Nevertheless, the design was approved by the Commission of Fine Arts, and then by the Treasury Department.

The Philadelphia Mint initially coined 15,000 pieces, but when they quickly sold, the Connecticut commission ordered the 10,000 remaining in the authorization. These were soon exhausted as well. Kreis's design has generally been praised by numismatic writers. The coins sold for $1, but have gained in value over the years and sell in the hundreds of dollars, depending on condition.

== Background ==
Although settlers had been drifting into what soon became the Connecticut Colony for years before then, 1635 is recognized as the year of the founding of Connecticut, for in that year John Winthrop the Younger was recognized as the first governor in the future state of Connecticut. No charter was granted at that time, and Connecticut could still have been absorbed into the Massachusetts Bay Colony. Following the Restoration of Charles II, Winthrop went to England where he was able to secure a charter for Connecticut, signed by the king, dated May 10, 1662.

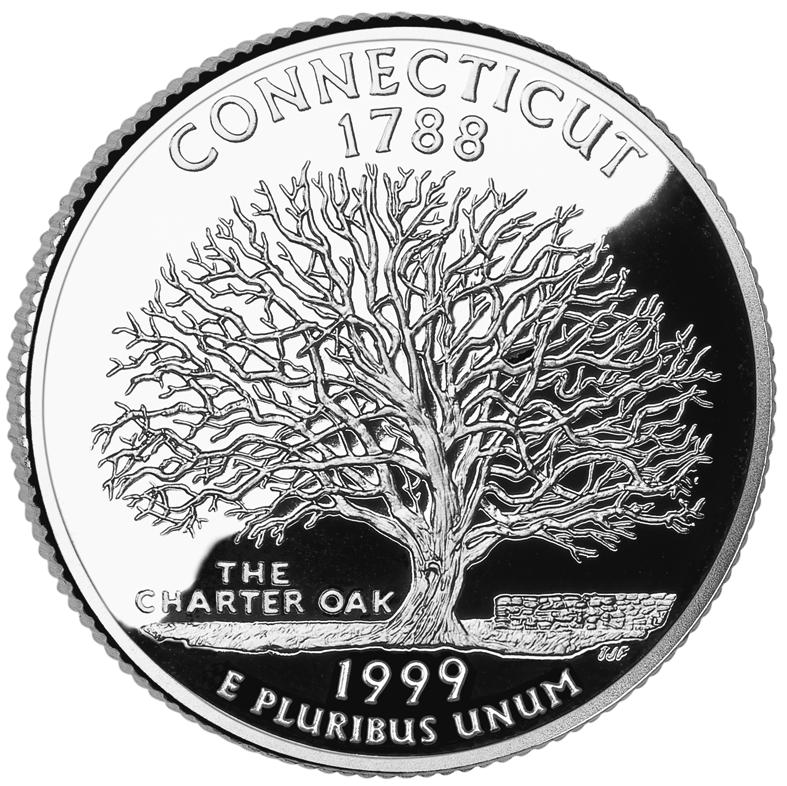
The 1999 Connecticut entry in the 50 State Quarters series also displays the Charter Oak.

Following Charles' death in 1685, James II came to the throne. In 1686, he consolidated the New England colonies into the Dominion of New England, naming Sir Edmund Andros as governor-general. The colonial charters were to be revoked, and when Andros came to Hartford, he planned to take the charter. By legend, when he announced his intent during a meeting on October 31, 1687, the candles in the room were suddenly extinguished, and Joseph Wadsworth bore the document away and hid it in a cavity in the Charter Oak, a white oak as much as 1,000 years old, growing on the property of the Wyllys family. After the Glorious Revolution of 1688, which overthrew James, the charter was brought forth again. The Charter Oak was uprooted in a storm on the night of August 21, 1856.

In 1935, it was not the practice of the government to sell commemorative coins. Congress, during the early years of commemorative coinage, usually designated a specific organization allowed to buy them at face value and to sell them to the public at a premium. In the case of the Connecticut Tercentenary half dollar, the enabling legislation specified that the authorized organization was to be the Connecticut Tercentenary Commission, and that the proceeds were to go towards financing the commission's projects.

== Legislation ==
Legislation for a Connecticut Tercentenary half dollar was introduced in the House of Representatives by that state's Francis T. Maloney on March 26, 1934. It was referred to the Committee on Coinage, Weights, and Measures. It was reported back from the committee on April 30 by New York's Andrew Somers with a one-page report recommending that the bill pass after being amended. The most significant changes were an increase in the authorized mintage from 10,000 to 25,000 and a requirement that the federal government not be put to any expense in the creation of the models from which dies to strike the coins could be prepared. Thus, the Tercentenary Commission was supposed to pay for a sculptor to design the coin.

The bill was considered by the House of Representatives on May 21, 1934. There was no debate; the only questions were by William McFarlane of Texas, asking if the coin would cost the federal government anything and if Connecticut was paying the expenses. Maloney assured him on these points, and the bill passed, as amended. The bill was transmitted to the Senate for its consideration and was referred to its Committee on Banking and Currency. On June 1, Connecticut senator Frederic Walcott reported the bill back to the Senate with a recommendation that it pass, and on June 13 it did so, without any recorded debate or questions. President Franklin D. Roosevelt signed the bill into law on June 21.

== Preparation ==
The design of the Connecticut Tercentenary half dollar was a Public Works Administration project, and as such was a technical violation of the requirement that the federal government not pay for the design. The Tercentenary Commission hired Henry Kreis to do the work, generally supervised by Paul Manship, a noted medalist. In November 1934, Samuel H. Fisher, head of the Tercentenary Commission, contacted Eggerton Swartwout, who was a member of the Commission of Fine Arts. The latter commission was charged by a 1921 executive order by President Warren G. Harding with rendering advisory opinions on public artworks, including coins. Swartwout set out the procedure to Fisher and told him that the commission member likely to take the leading role was sculptor Lee Lawrie. Fisher sent photographs of Kreis's plaster models to Swartwout and Lawrie, as well as to Fine Arts Commission chairman Charles Moore and to Acting Director of the Mint Mary M. O'Reilly.

Lawrie had a number of criticisms, feeling the eagle's head and feet were more like those of a hawk and that the stars between the eagle and the name of the country were so small as to be indistinguishable. Swartwout wrote to Moore on the 15th, telling him that the coin was strongly supported by art history professor Theodore Sizer of Yale University, a member of the Tercentenary Commission. The Fine Arts Commission viewed the models on December 6 and approved them subject to Lawrie's criticisms being addressed, which they were, for the most part. Lawrie had disliked the broken branch on the right side of the Charter Oak and wanted it changed, but this was not done. The final models were approved by the Fine Arts Commission in early February, and the Treasury Department added its endorsement on February 6. The models were reduced to coin-sized hubs by the Medallic Art Company of New York; these were shipped to the Philadelphia Mint and used to make dies with which to strike the coins.

== Design ==
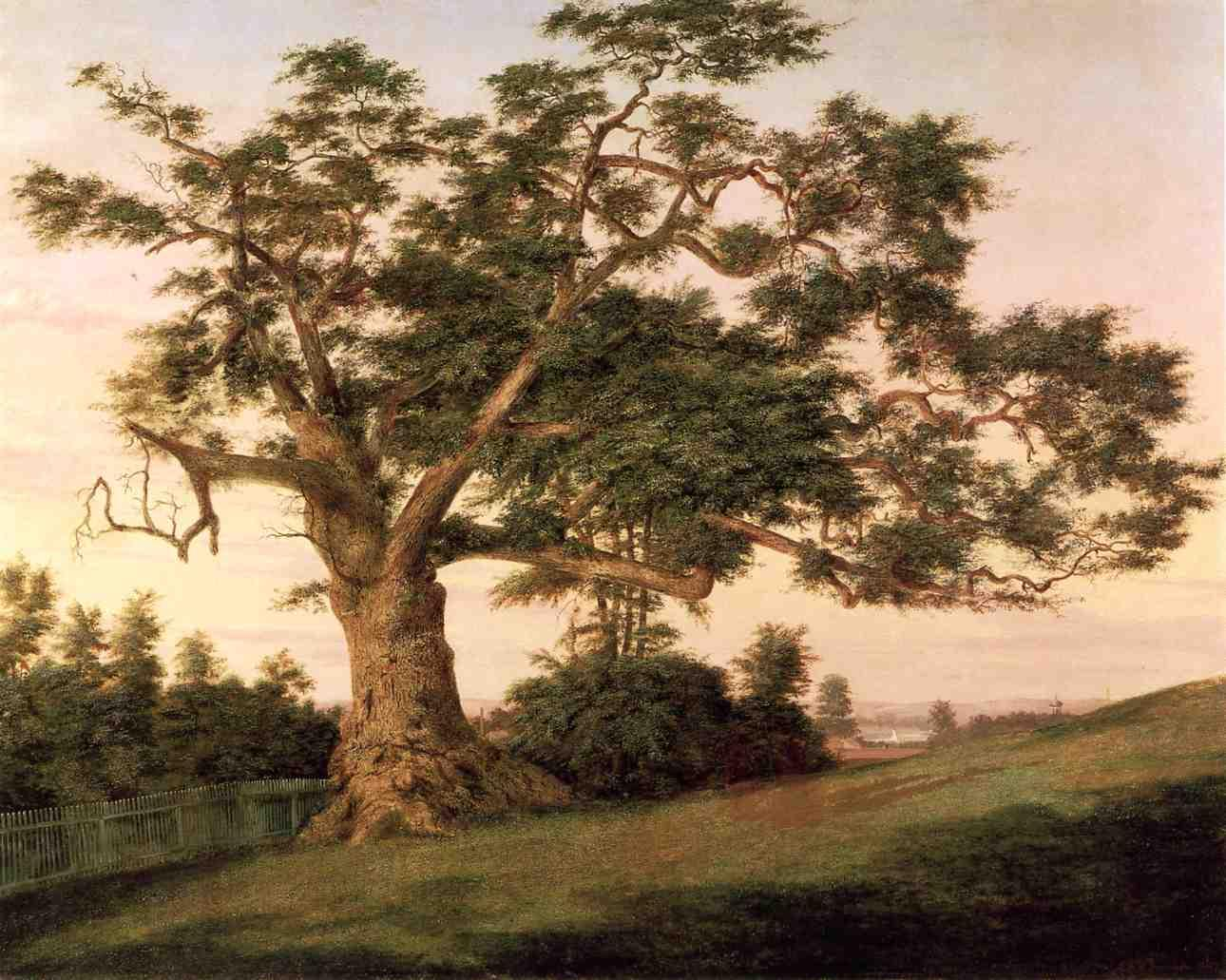
Charles Brownell's 1857 painting of the Charter Oak

The obverse of the coin depicts the Charter Oak and is based on a painting by Charles DeWolf Brownell, who had begun his work in 1855, a year before lightning felled the tree. Below the ground that surrounds the base of the tree is CONNECTICUT 1635–1935; surrounding the Charter Oak are its name, IN GOD WE TRUST and LIBERTY. The reverse depicts an eagle upon a rocky mound. The name of the country and the denomination of the coin surround the eagle, with E PLURIBUS UNUM to the left of the bird's legs. Thirteen stars, representing the original American colonies, lie between the eagle and the lettering, but are so faint as to be invisible on some strikings.

Stuart Mosher, in his 1940 book on commemoratives, described the Connecticut piece as "among the most handsome of the entire series. The very simplicity with which the artist has portrayed the massive oak is pleasing to the most critical." In anticipation of a complaint that the leaves on the oak were proportionately larger than they should be, Professor Sizer had told Swartwout that they needed to be enlarged to show at all, something Anthony Swiatek and Walter Breen, in their 1988 book on commemorative coins, call "perfectly good grounds". The cavity in the oak is also exaggerated in size. Q. David Bowers, in his book on commemorative coins, describes the eagle as being "of starkly modernistic form (somewhat similar to the eagle motifs used in Germany at the time)". Kreis would use a very similar eagle when he designed the 1936 Bridgeport half dollar.

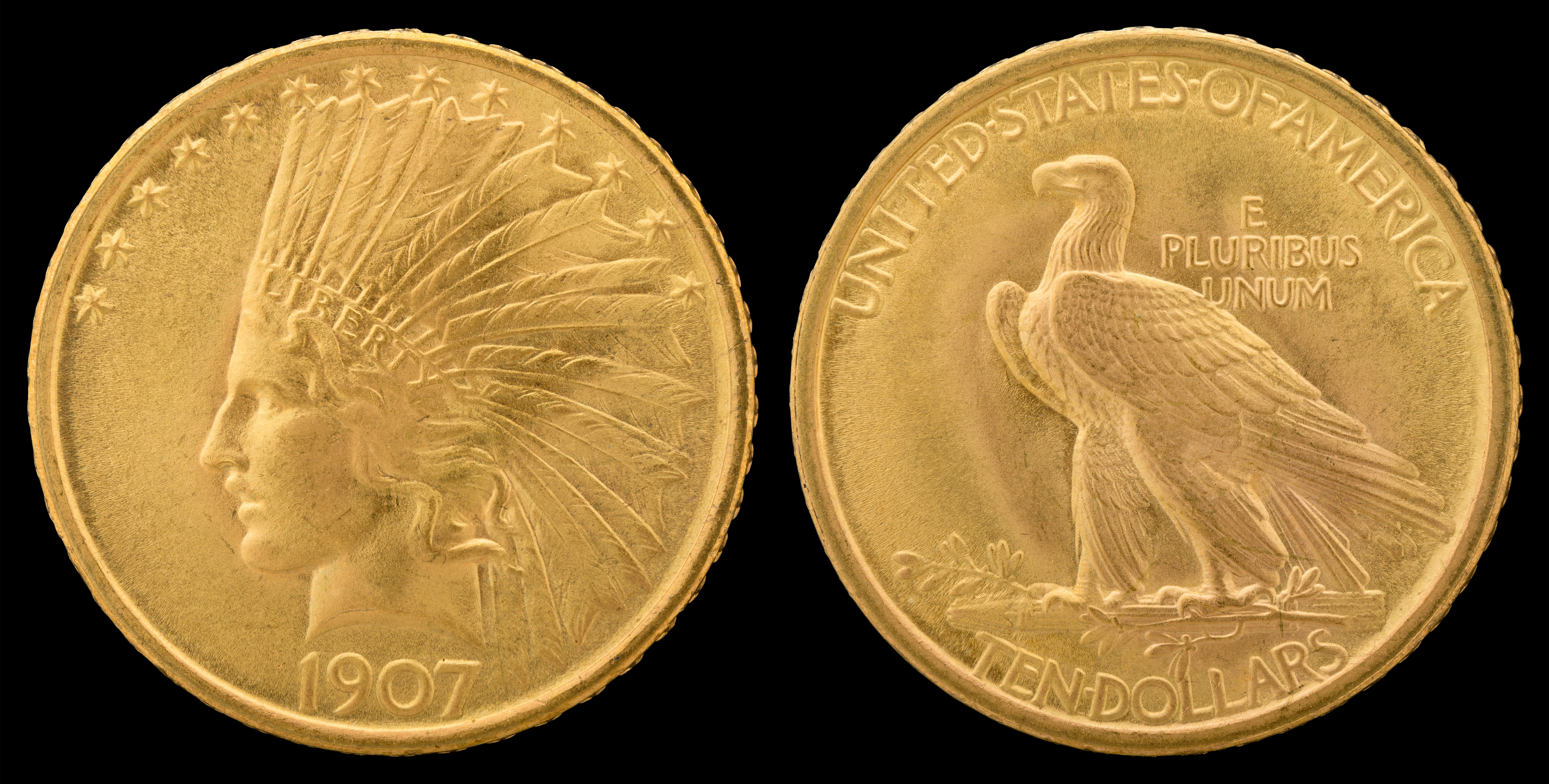
Augustus Saint-Gaudens' Indian Head eagle (1907)

Art historian Cornelius Vermeule, in his volume on the artistry of U.S. coins and medals, stated that Kreis "used the great oak ... as a most effective composition on the obverse, and a massive eagle, thrusting like a rocket, on the reverse". He noted, "all elements of the Connecticut Tercentenary coin blend superbly, the mottos and aphorisms disappearing amid the leafy clusters on the obverse and the balance of the opposite side as successful as for the Eagle of 1907 (by Augustus Saint-Gaudens)".

== Production, distribution, and collecting ==
Initially only 15,000 of the authorized quantity of 25,000 were struck at the Philadelphia Mint, as this was the quantity the Tercentenary Commission at first ordered. These were struck not later than April 10, 1935, and were sent at the commission's request to the Hartford National Bank and Trust Company, distributing agent for the coin. Placed on sale on April 21, they were rapidly exhausted, and on April 25, Fisher ordered the remaining 10,000. The commission had enquired as to the possibility of having the coins struck at different mints and in proof condition, but was told that the heavy volume of work at the Mint forbade having those done. The price per coin was $1. In addition to the coins sent to Hartford, the Mint struck 18 pieces, reserved for inspection and testing at the 1936 meeting of the annual Assay Commission. The United States Post Office Department issued a three-cent stamp for the anniversary on April 26, 1935, also depicting the Charter Oak.

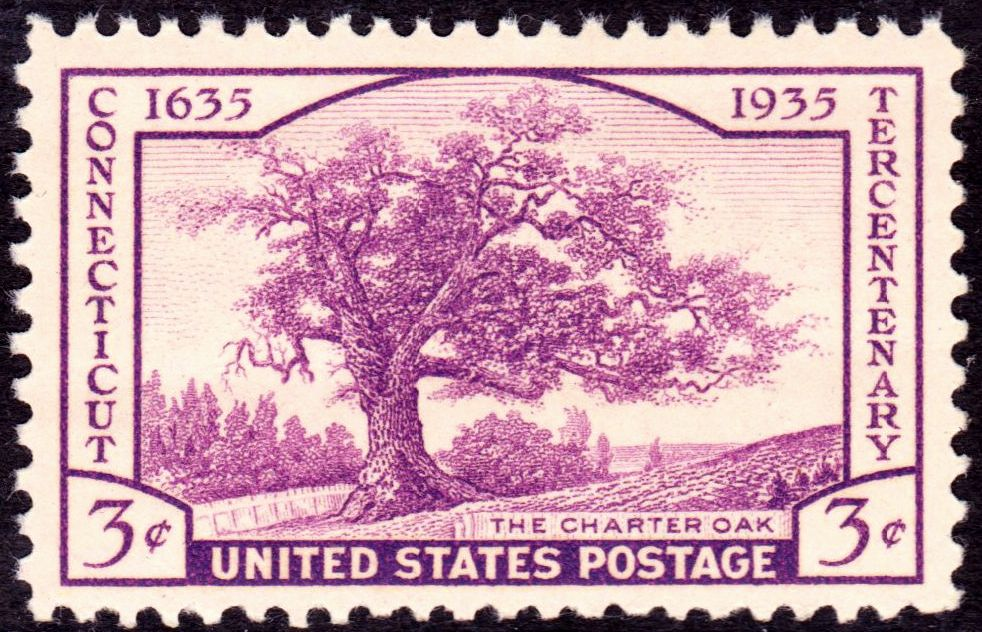
The three-cent stamp issued for the Connecticut Tercentenary, displaying the Charter Oak

Six banks in Connecticut distributed the coin through their branches, placing them in small boxes bearing the selling bank's name. Mail orders were taken through the Hartford National Bank's Main Street branch. The coins sold mostly to residents of Connecticut; the coin collecting community took only a few thousand. By July 1935, they were sold out but for a few the Tercentenary Commission was reserving for presentation to dignitaries; even those few were apparently gone by September. According to Q. David Bowers, "there was never any problem concerning profiteering, exploitation, or anything else connected with this issue". Swiatek, in his later book on commemoratives, noted, "the Connecticut Tercentenary Commission did a fantastic job in distributing a large percentage of this issue to Connecticut residents."

The coins quickly commanded a premium after their 1935 issue, rising to $6 during the commemorative coin boom of 1936. They had subsided back to the $2.50 level by 1940, but thereafter increased steadily in value, rising to $730 during the second commemorative coin boom in 1980. The deluxe edition of R. S. Yeoman's A Guide Book of United States Coins, published in 2015, lists the coin for between $260 and $700 each depending on condition. The coin with the highest grade known sold at auction in 2002 for $9,487.

== Sources ==
- Bowers, Q. David (1992). Commemorative Coins of the United States: A Complete Encyclopedia. Wolfeboro, NH: Bowers and Merena Galleries, Inc. ISBN 978-0-943161-35-8.
- Flynn, Kevin (2008). The Authoritative Reference on Commemorative Coins 1892–1954. Roswell, GA: Kyle Vick. OCLC 711779330.
- Slabaugh, Arlie R. (1975). United States Commemorative Coinage (second ed.). Racine, WI: Whitman Publishing. ISBN 978-0-307-09377-6.
- Swiatek, Anthony (2012). Encyclopedia of the Commemorative Coins of the United States. Chicago: KWS Publishers. ISBN 978-0-9817736-7-4.
- Swiatek, Anthony; Breen, Walter (1981). The Encyclopedia of United States Silver & Gold Commemorative Coins, 1892 to 1954. New York: Arco Publishing. ISBN 978-0-668-04765-4.
- Taxay, Don (1967). An Illustrated History of U.S. Commemorative Coinage. New York: Arco Publishing. ISBN 978-0-668-01536-3.
- Vermeule, Cornelius (1971). Numismatic Art in America. Cambridge, MA: The Belknap Press of Harvard University Press. ISBN 978-0-674-62840-3.
- Yeoman, R.S. (2015). A Guide Book of United States Coins (1st Deluxe ed.). Atlanta, GA: Whitman Publishing. ISBN 978-0-7948-4307-6.
