= Blaise Hayward =

Blaise Hayward (born 1964, Toronto) is a photographer and sculptor working in bronze and found materials.

== Early life ==
Hayward moved to New York City in 1996, where he maintained a commercial photography studio for decades while working in fine-art photography and sculpture.

== Work ==
Hayward's photographic work explores ideas of lineage and cultural resilience.

In 2024, Hayward began working on America ~ The Statehood Quarters, a series of high resolution photographs that depict all fifty Statehood quarters. The series explores the contradictory experience of nationality in contemporary America. In his project, Tickets Please, Hayward's use of archival materials explores collective history through documentation as record keeping. Tickets Please will be published as a photobook by Rizzoli in the spring of 2027.
