= Old Supreme Court Chamber =

United States Capitol room

Coordinates: 38.89026°N 77.00892°W

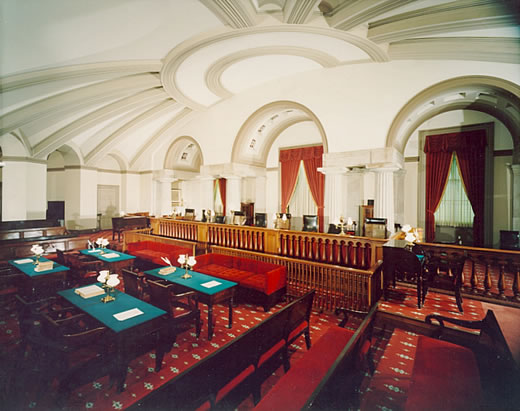
Chamber as viewed from southwest.

The Old Supreme Court Chamber is a room on the ground floor of the North Wing of the United States Capitol. From 1800 to 1806, the room was the lower half of the first United States Senate chamber. After construction of its vaulted ceiling divided it from the Senate chamber above, from 1810 to 1860 it served as the courtroom for the Supreme Court of the United States. The court then moved upstairs when the Senate moved to its present chambers, and this room became the law library. It has since been refurbished to look as it did when it served for court hearings.

== History and use ==
Construction on the North Wing began in 1793 with the laying of the cornerstone by President George Washington. Although interior work was unfinished, the Senate relocated from its 1791 Philadelphia location, Congress Hall, in November 1800. The chamber interior, including an upper-level public gallery, was finally completed early in 1805, just before the start of the Samuel Chase impeachment trial. Its completion allowed the Federal government to move to Washington, D.C. The North Wing, as the only completed section of the Capitol, originally hosted both houses of the United States Congress, the Library of Congress, and the Supreme Court. In addition to the Chase trial, the chamber was the location of President Thomas Jefferson's inauguration in 1801.

=== Division into two levels ===
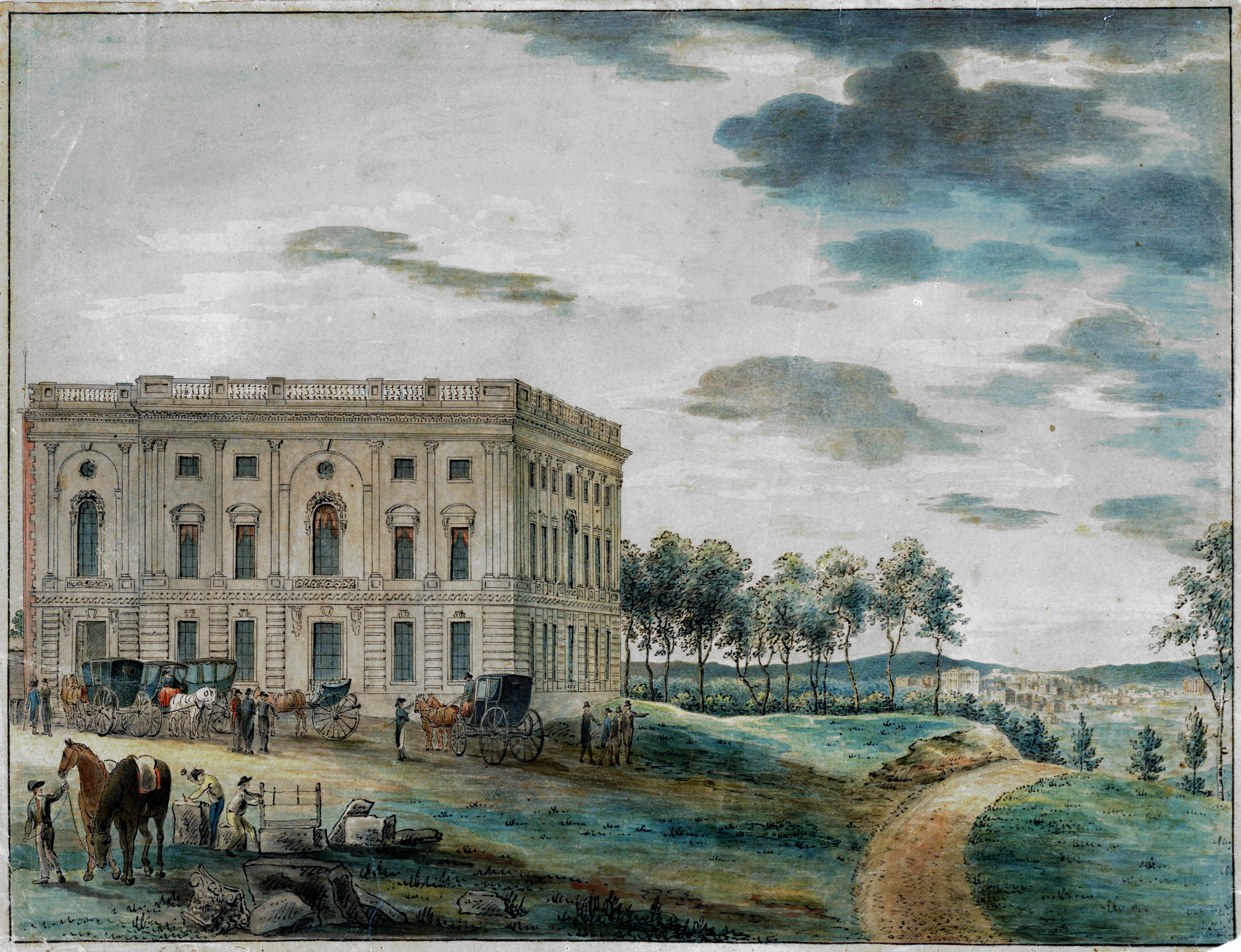
The North Wing upon completion in 1800

By 1806 the North Wing was already deteriorating from heavy use and required repairs. The Architect of the Capitol at the time, Benjamin Henry Latrobe, decided that the repairs would provide an opportunity to expand room space in the Capitol by dividing the chamber in half. The upper half would serve as a new chamber for the Senate (that area is now known as the Old Senate Chamber), and the lower half would be used for the Supreme Court.

The size and structure of Latrobe's vaulted, semicircular ceiling were virtually unprecedented in the United States. The room is 50 feet (15 m) deep and 74 feet 8 inches (22.76 m) wide. Construction began in November 1806 with the gutting of the former two-story Senate Chamber and rooms above it and lasted until 1810. The process was not without tragedy, as an assistant to Latrobe, John Lenthall, Clerk of the Works, was killed upon removing a center wooden ceiling support prematurely, against Latrobe's advice. The unfinished masonry ceiling collapsed, crushing Lenthall in the process. Lenthall's death was a setback not just to construction but to Latrobe's reputation as an architect, which he struggled to rebuild for the rest of his career.

=== Fire of 1814 and reconstruction ===
Chief Justice John Marshall

The Supreme Court barely had the opportunity to hear cases in the chamber before the justices fled Washington in the face of advancing British forces during the War of 1812. On August 24, 1814, the British occupied the city and burnt several government buildings, including the North and South wings of the Capitol building. Despite the burnings, which left much of the North Wing gutted, the chamber with its vaulted ceiling survived. With safety in mind, however, Latrobe ordered the ceiling to be broken down and rebuilt for the final time in 1815. Latrobe resigned two years later. It was under his successor, Charles Bulfinch, that the chamber was completed in 1819, in time for the next session of the Supreme Court.

In 1844, Samuel Morse held the first demonstration of the Baltimore–Washington telegraph line in the chamber, sending the message "What hath God wrought".

The Supreme Court resided in the chamber for the next forty-one years, until 1860. During that time, the court heard arguments on such landmark cases as McCulloch v. Maryland, Gibbons v. Ogden, Dred Scott v. Sandford, and United States v. The Amistad. Two chief justices—John Marshall and Roger Taney—presided over the Supreme Court in the chamber.

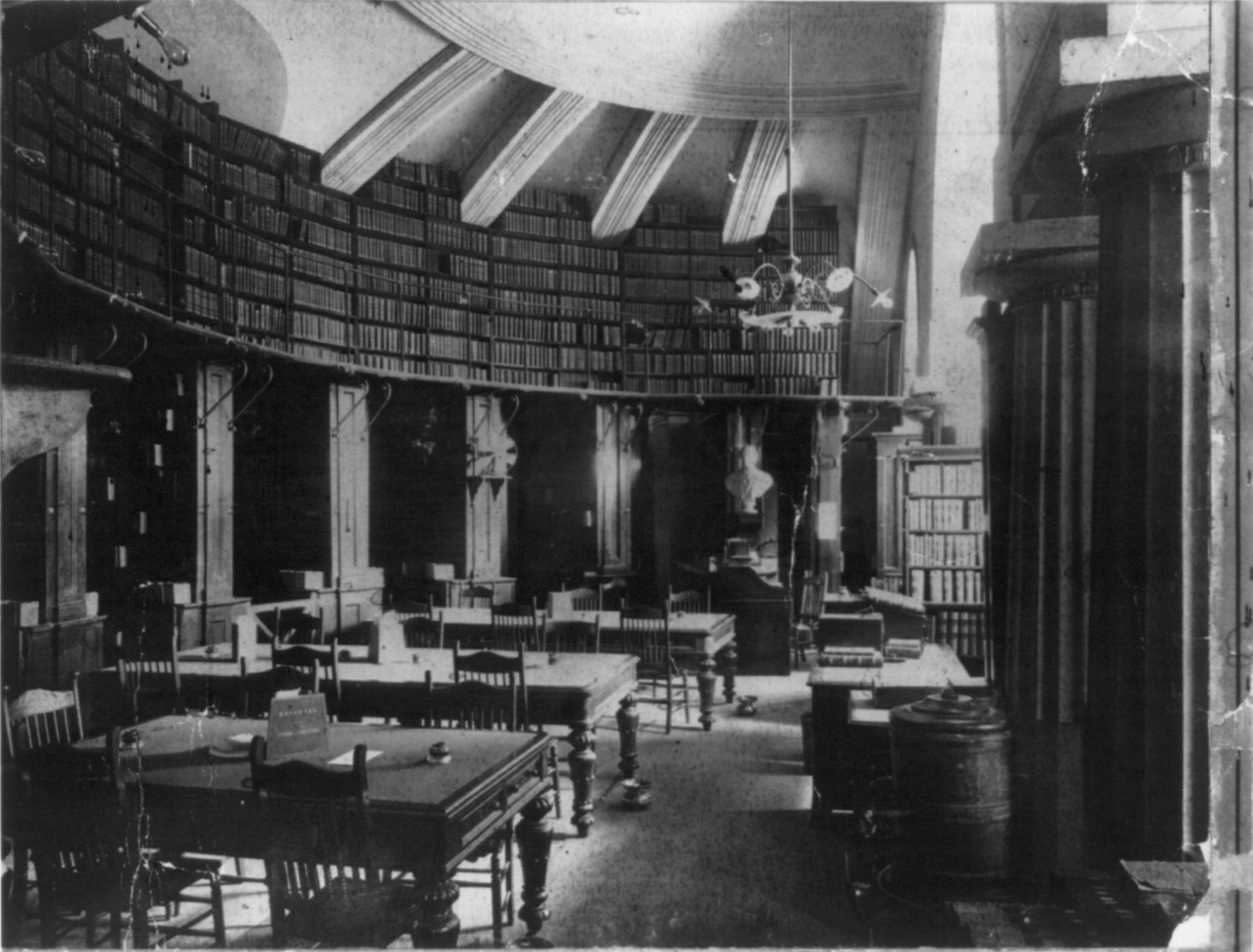
The Law Library of Congress occupied the chamber 1860–1941

=== Post-Supreme Court and restoration ===
Upon the departure of the Supreme Court to the Old Senate Chamber upstairs in 1860, the chamber was put to use as the Law Library of Congress until 1941. After the Supreme Court vacated the Capitol building itself for its present-day quarters in the Supreme Court Building, the room was used as a reference library and later as a committee room for the Joint Committee on Atomic Energy from 1955 to 1960. From 1960 to 1972, the chamber was a rather mundane storage room until Congress voted to restore it to its historic antebellum appearance, which everyday citizens can visit and see.

An 1854 diagram of the chamber was used to establish the layout and positioning of furniture in the chamber, and a portrait of John Marshall provided clues towards a mahogany railing and the carpet pattern. Still existing furnishings in the possession of the United States Capitol were sent to the chamber, as well as donated items such as Roger Taney's chair. By 1975, the chamber was opened to the public and has served as a museum ever since.

== Artwork in the Old Supreme Court Chamber ==
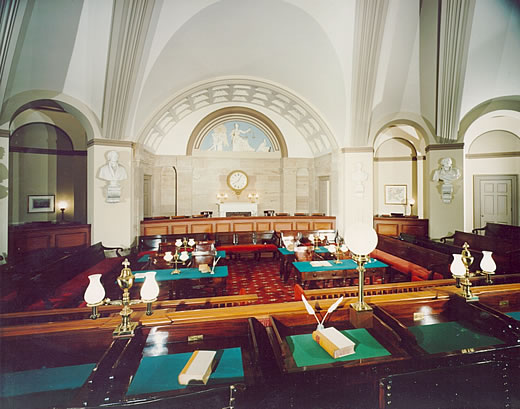
View of the chamber from Justices' desks

There are several notable pieces of artwork in the Old Supreme Court Chamber. There are four marble busts of the first four Chief Justices of the Supreme Court: John Jay, John Rutledge, Oliver Ellsworth, and John Marshall. Until February 9, 2023, a bust of Roger Taney could be found in the adjacent robing room, which serves as the entrance for visitors into the chamber. Above one fireplace is a clock that is said apocryphally to be ordered by Roger Taney and set five minutes forward under his direction to promote promptness in the court proceedings. Above the clock is a plaster relief of Lady Justice, notable for a lack of blindfold. She is accompanied by America, depicted as a winged youth, holding the United States Constitution as a star overhead shines light upon the document. Although never specified by the artist, Justice looks to the document with her unblinded eyes. An eagle seen protecting law books and an owl beneath Justice, two symbolic birds, are featured in the sculpture. The relief was the work of Carlo Franzoni in 1817.

=== Taney controversy ===
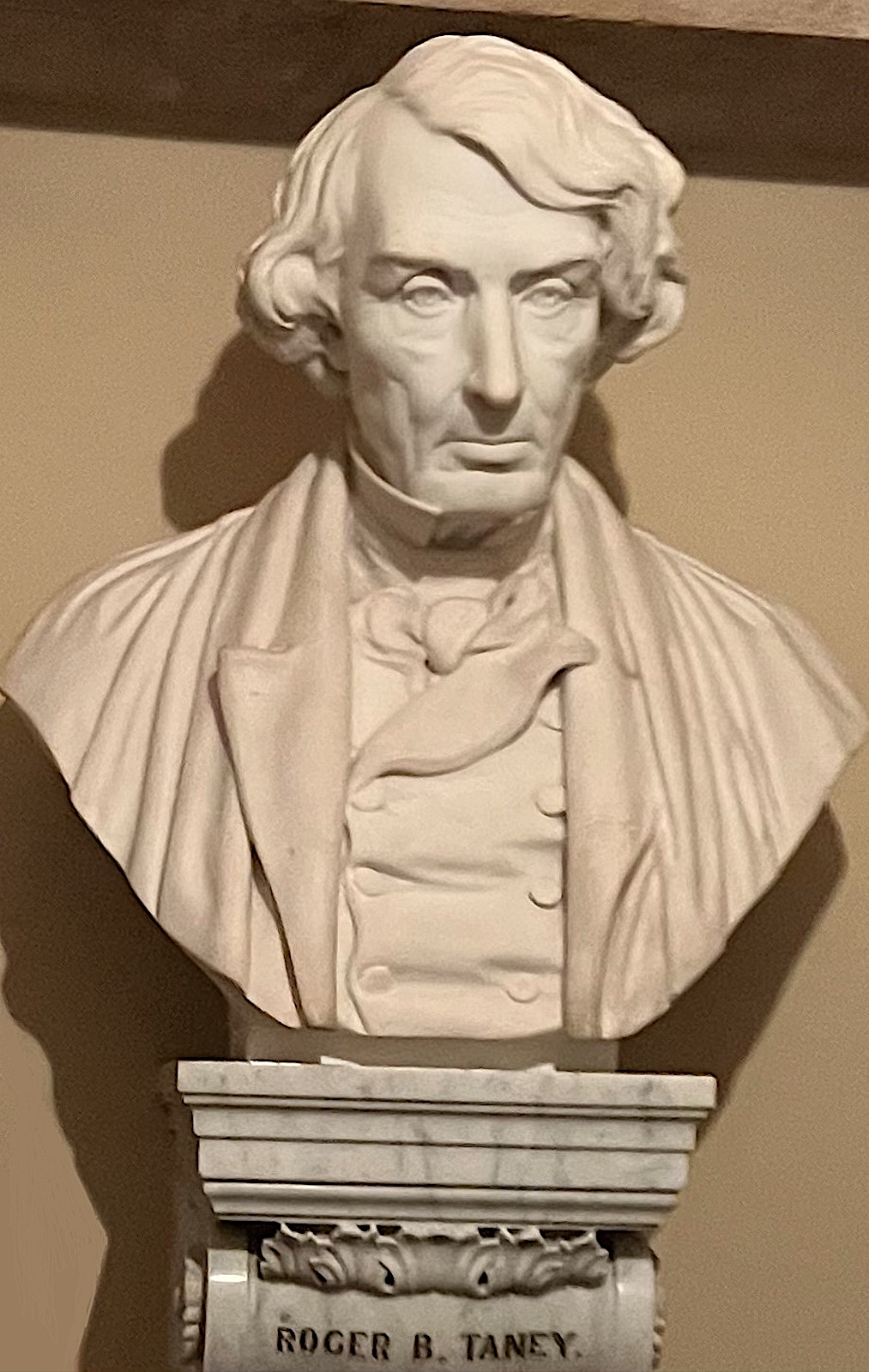
Bust of Taney in the Old Supreme Court Chamber, source of the controversy.

On July 22, 2020, amid the George Floyd protests, the U.S. House of Representatives voted 305–113 to remove a bust of Chief Justice Roger B. Taney (as well as statues honoring figures who were part of the Confederate States of America during the American Civil War) from the U.S. Capitol and replace it with a bust of Justice Thurgood Marshall, who was a champion of civil rights. The bill called for removing Taney's bust within 30 days after the law's passage. The bust had been mounted in the old robing room adjacent to the Old Supreme Court Chamber in the Capitol Building. The bill (H.R. 7573) also created a "process to obtain a bust of Marshall ... and place it there within a minimum of two years." After the bill reached the Republican-led Senate on July 30, 2020 (S.4382), it was referred to the Committee on Rules and Administration, but no further action was taken.

On June 29, 2021, the U.S. House of Representatives passed a resolution 285 to 120 with sixty-seven Republican Representatives to replace the bust with one of Thurgood Marshall and expel Confederate statues from the U.S. Capitol.

On February 9, 2023, the bust of Roger Taney was officially removed from the United States Capitol Building in Washington, D.C., thanks to an effort led by Maryland Democratic Senators Ben Cardin and Chris Van Hollen, as well as Maryland Democratic Representative Steny Hoyer, to be replaced by a new work of art honoring Justice Thurgood Marshall.

== Gallery ==
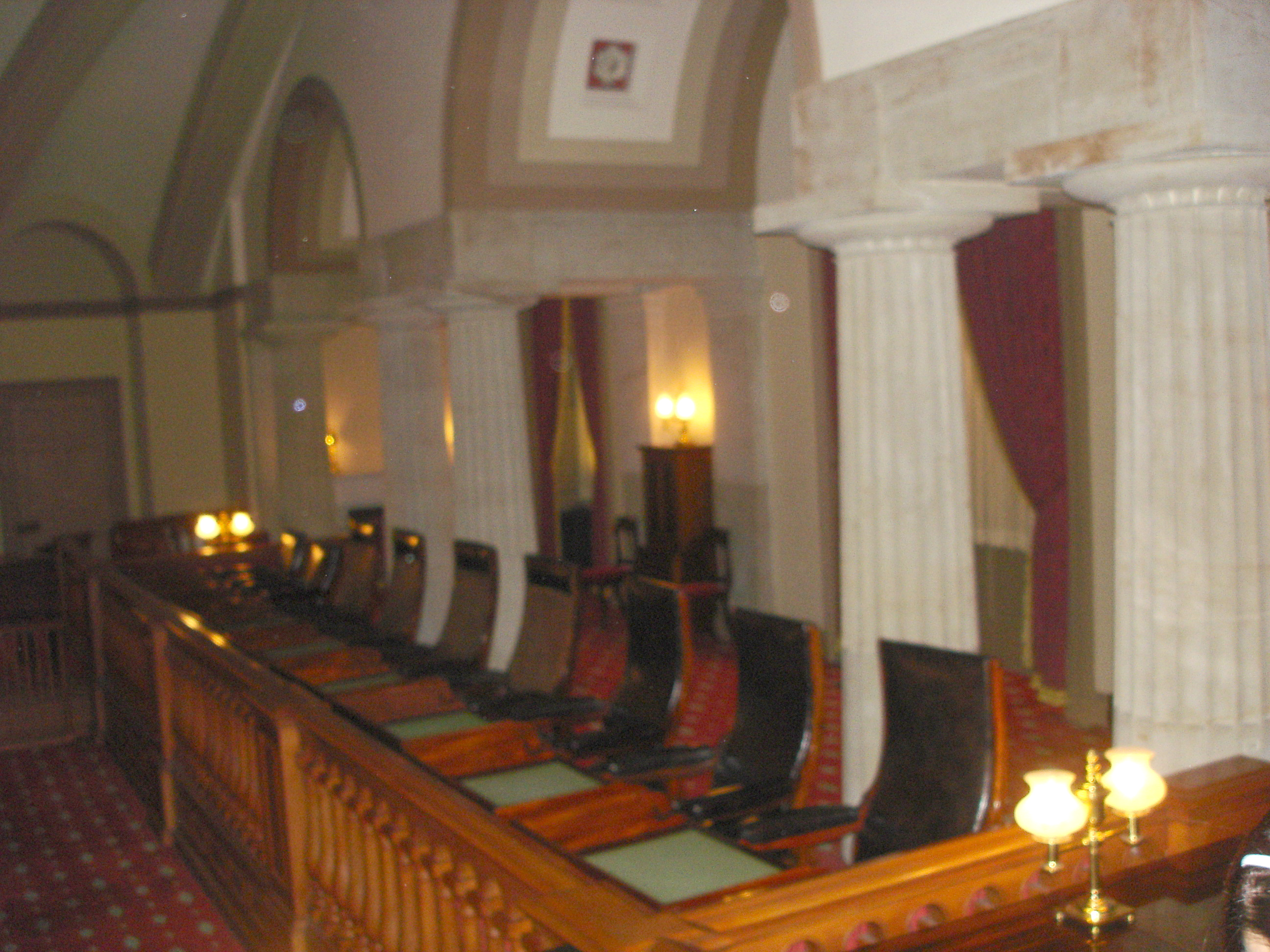

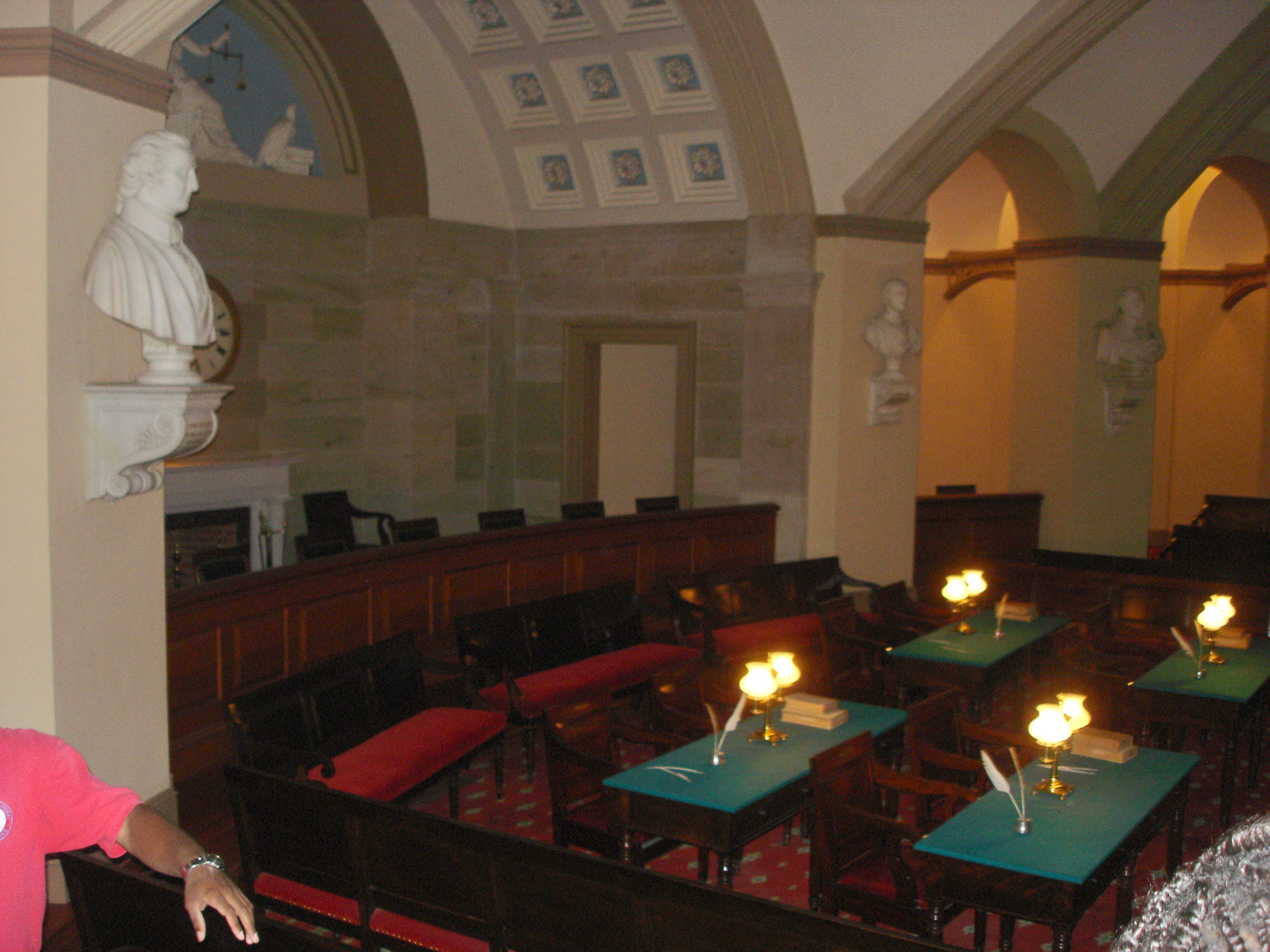

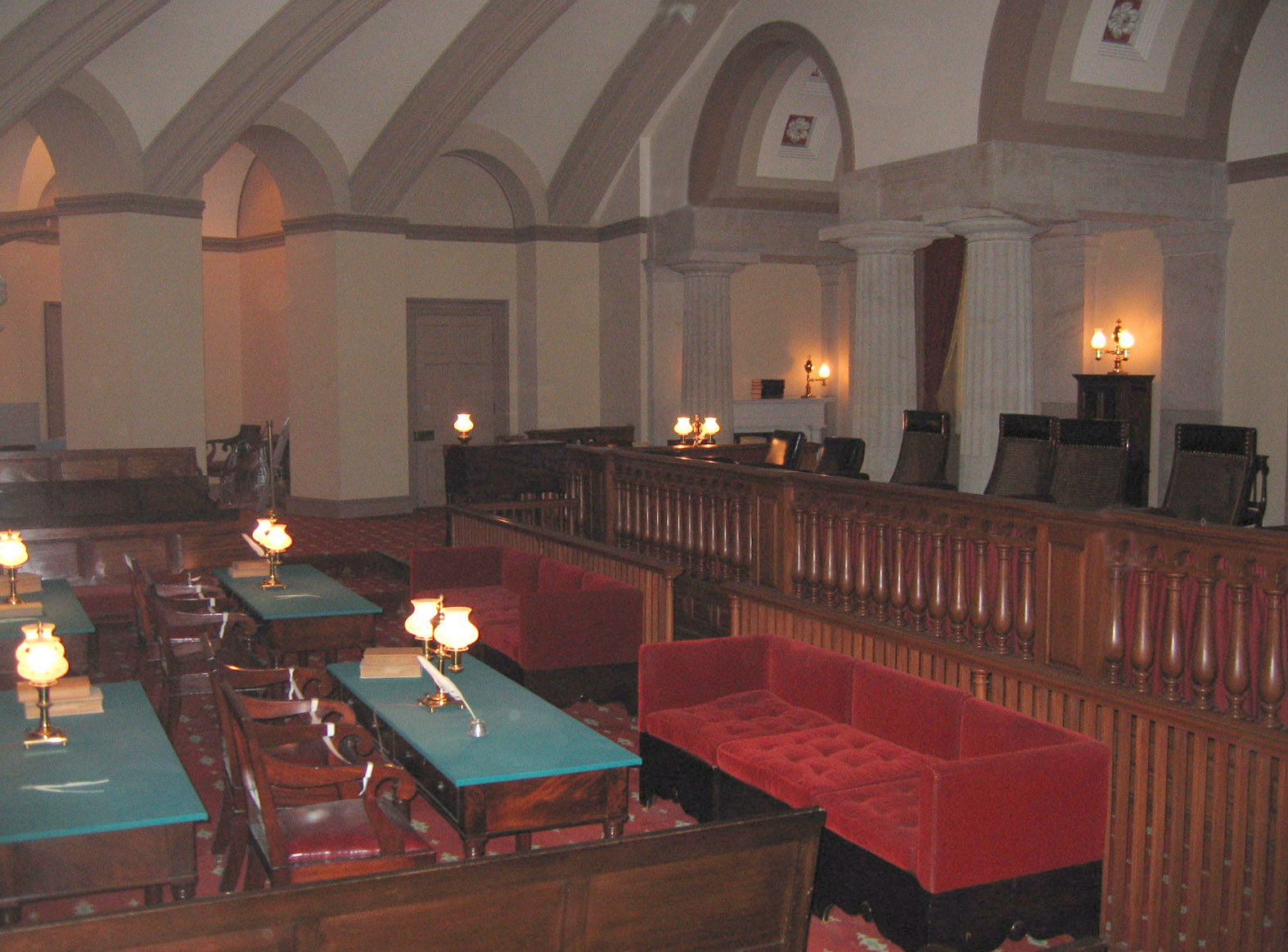

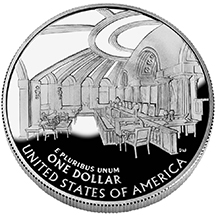
The reverse of the 2005 Chief Justice John Marshall silver dollar depicts the Supreme Court chamber during Marshall's term
