= Thomas Alva Edison silver dollar =

Commemorative coin of the United States

Thomas Alva Edison dollar
- United States
- Value: 1 U.S. Dollar
- Mass: 26.730 g
- Diameter: 38.1 mm
- Thickness: 2.58 mm
- Edge: Reeded
- Composition: 90% Ag / 10% Cu
- Years of minting: 2004
- Mintage: 92,150 Uncirculated 211,055 Proof
- Mint marks: P

Obverse
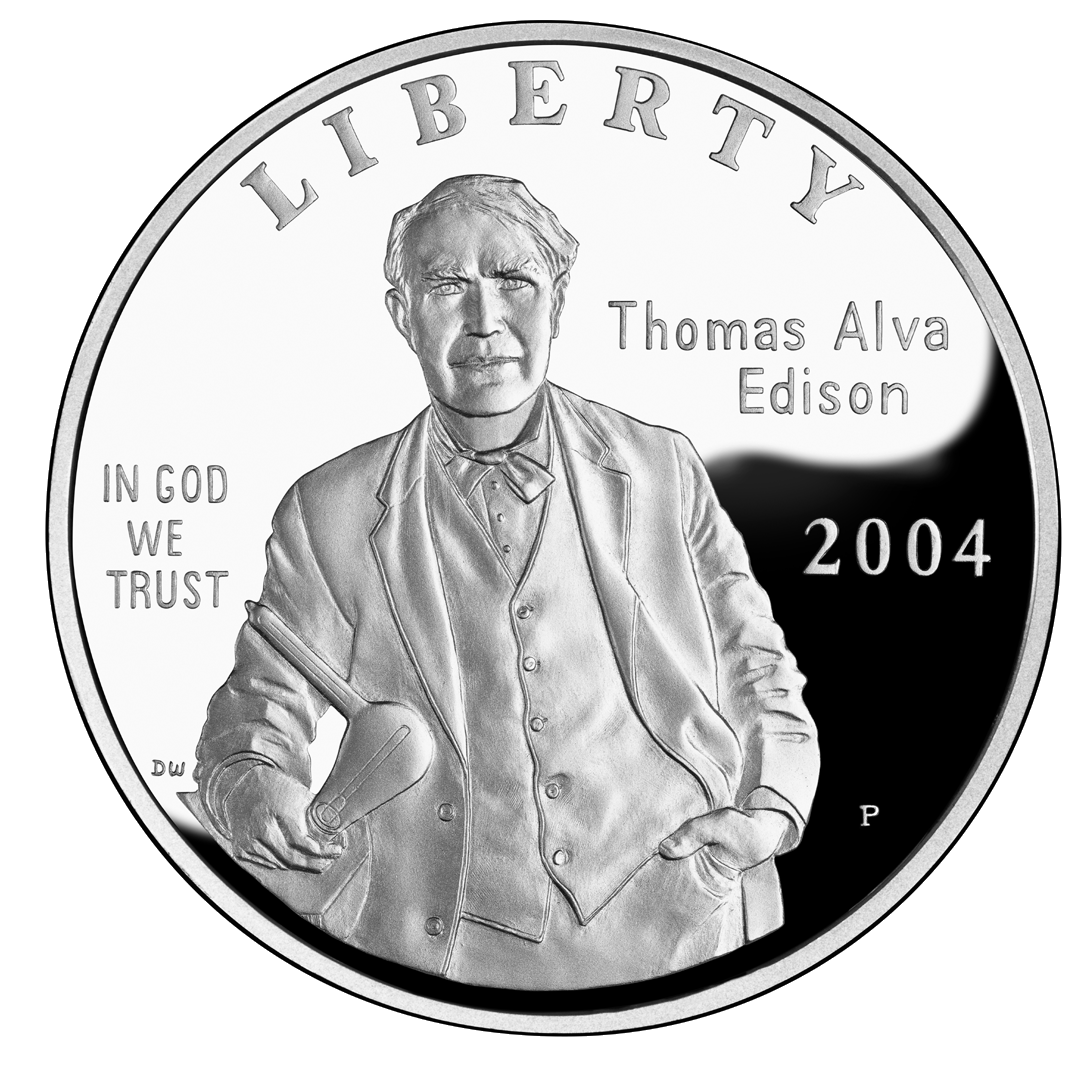
- Designer: Donna Weaver
- Design date: 2004
- Design: Portrait of Thomas Edison holding a light bulb

Reverse
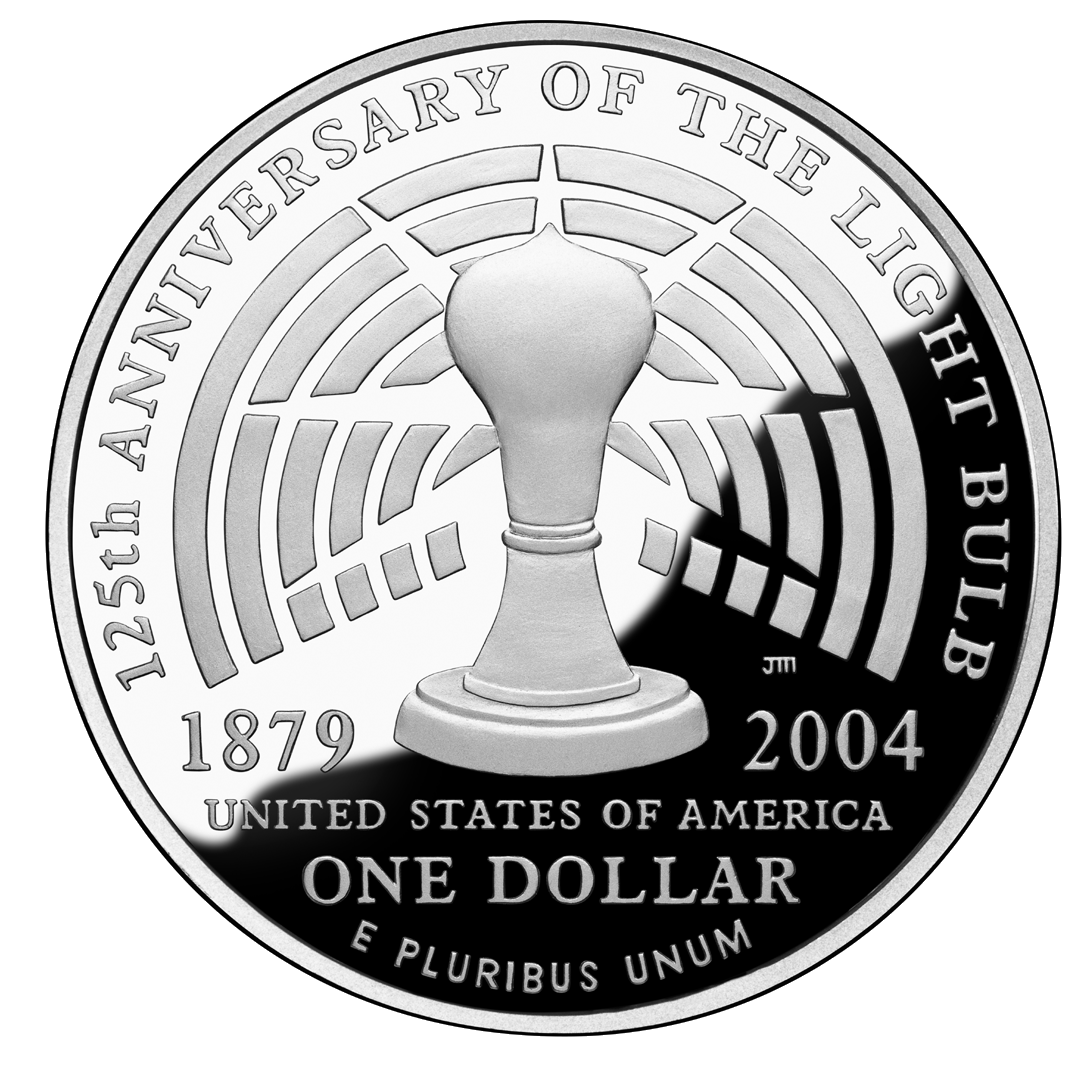
- Design: Edison's 1879 light bulb with arcs surrounding
- Designer: John Mercanti
- Design date: 2004

The Thomas Alva Edison silver dollar is a commemorative silver dollar issued by the United States Mint in 2004. It portrays American inventor Thomas Edison and was issued to commemorate the 125th anniversary of the invention of the light bulb by Edison.

== Legislation ==
The Thomas Alva Edison Commemorative Coin Act (Pub. L. 105–331 (text) (PDF)) was introduced in the House of Representatives by Paul Gillmor of Ohio on February 11, 1997. Earlier proposals were submitted to commemorate 150th anniversary of Edison's February 11, 1847 birth in a prior Congress but were not passed. The bill would pass the House the following year on September 9, 1998, and was passed by the Senate on October 7, 1998. President Bill Clinton signed the bill into law on October 31, 1998. The law authorized the production of a silver dollar to commemorate the life of Edison and the 125th anniversary of the invention of the light bulb in 2004. The act allowed the coins to be struck in both proof and uncirculated finishes, and stated that no more than 500,000 coins would be minted.

== Design ==
The obverse of the coin, designed by Donna Weaver, features a portrait of Edison holding an early experimental light bulb in his laboratory. The reverse, designed by John Mercanti, features a rendering of Edison's first light bulb.

== Production and distribution ==
The coins went on sale on February 11, 2004. A small discount was offered to those who purchased the coins prior to March 26. Uncirculated coins were sold for $33 and proof coins were sold for $37; the uncirculated coins were sold in various packaging. A $10 surcharge was included in the price, with the proceeds being split between eight different organizations. Among those organizations were the Edison Institute, the Edison Plaza Museum, and the National Park Service. Mintage totaled 92,150 for uncirculated coins and 211,055 for proof sets for a total of 303,205 coins minted. Although sales fell short of the 500,000 coins authorized, the dollar was received well by coin collectors.

== See also ==
- List of United States commemorative coins and medals (2000s)
- United States commemorative coins
