= Charter Oak =

Large oak tree in Hartford, Connecticut

Coordinates: 41.7593°N 72.6736°W

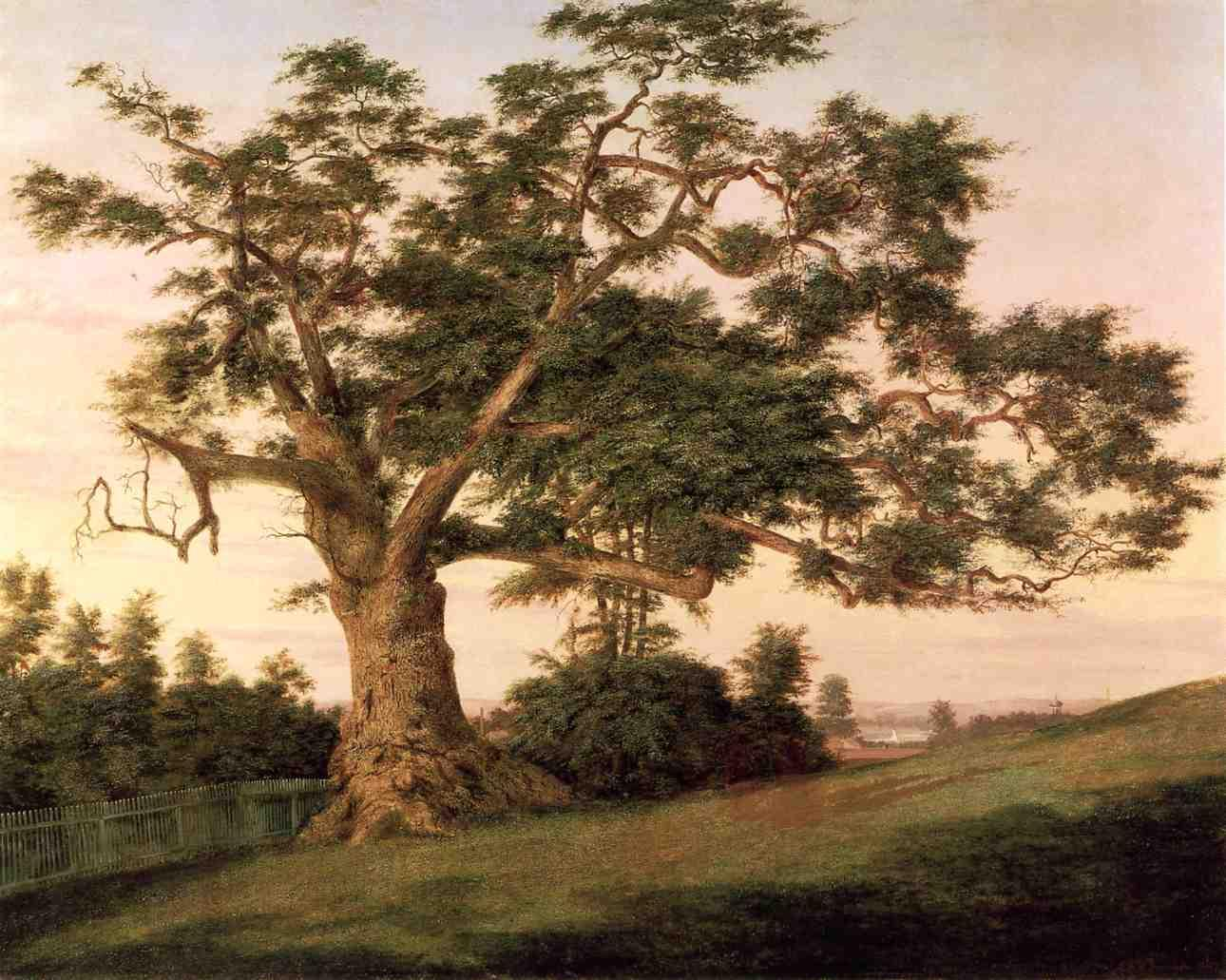
The Charter Oak, oil on canvas, Charles De Wolf Brownell, 1857. Wadsworth Atheneum

The Charter Oak was an exceptionally large white oak tree growing on Wyllys Hill in Hartford, Connecticut, from around the 12th or 13th century until it fell during a storm in 1856. Connecticut colonists hid Connecticut's Royal Charter of 1662 within the tree's hollow to thwart its confiscation by Sir Edmund Andros. The oak was viewed as a symbol of American independence and was commemorated on the Connecticut State Quarter. It was also depicted on a commemorative half dollar and a postage stamp for Connecticut's tercentennial in 1935.

== Early history ==
In the 1630s, a delegation of local Indians approached Samuel Wyllys, the settler who owned and cleared much of the land around Hartford, to encourage preservation of the tree, describing it as having been planted ceremonially for the sake of peace when their tribe first settled in the area:

It has been the guide of our ancestors for centuries as to the time of planting our corn; when the leaves are the size of a mouse's ears, then is the time to put the seed into the ground.

=== Incident ===
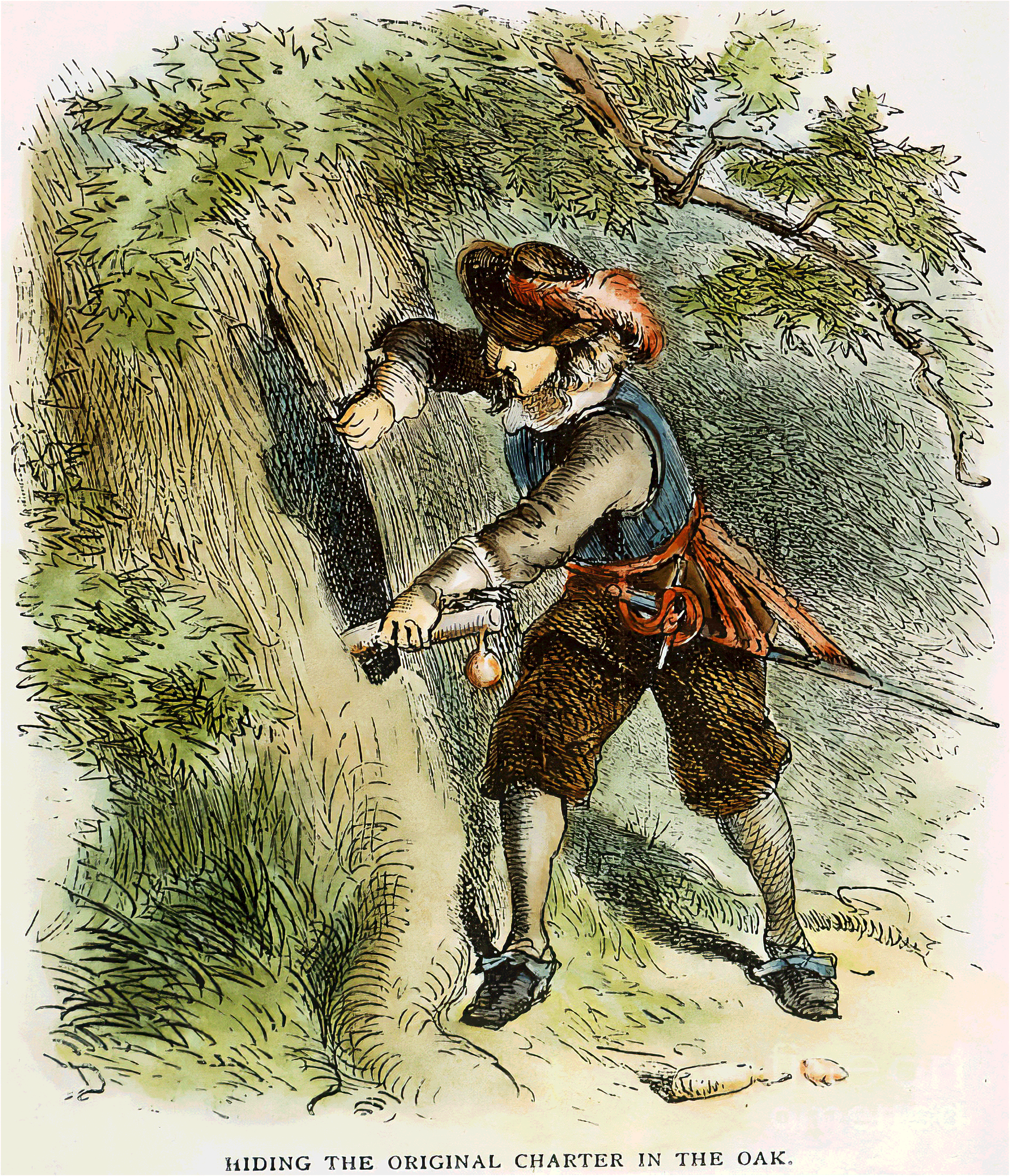
Hiding the charter in the Oak

The name "Charter Oak" stems from the event in late 1687, when Connecticut colonists used it as a hiding place for the Charter of 1662.

King Charles II granted the Connecticut Colony an unusual degree of autonomy in 1662. His successor James II consolidated several colonies into the Dominion of New England in 1686, in part to take firmer control of them. He later appointed Sir Edmund Andros as governor-general over it, who stated that his appointment had invalidated the charters of the various constituent colonies. He went to each colony to collect their charters, presumably seeing symbolic value in physically reclaiming the documents. Andros arrived in Hartford late in October 1687, where his mission was at least as unwelcome as it had been in the other colonies.

The incident took place on October 31, 1687, in the upper room at Zachariah Sanford's tavern. Andros demanded the document, and the colonists produced it, but the candle lights were suddenly doused during the ensuing discussion. The colonists spirited the document out a window, and Captain Joseph Wadsworth carried it to the oak tree.

In 1900, it was suggested that a copy was surreptitiously substituted for the original in June 1687 and the original was hidden in the oak lest Andros find it in any search of buildings. The Museum of Connecticut History credits the idea that Andros never got the original charter and displays a parchment that it regards as the original. The Connecticut Historical Society possesses a fragment of it.

Andros was overthrown in Boston two years later in the 1689 Boston revolt, and the Dominion of New England was dissolved.

== Relics ==
The Oak on coins and postage

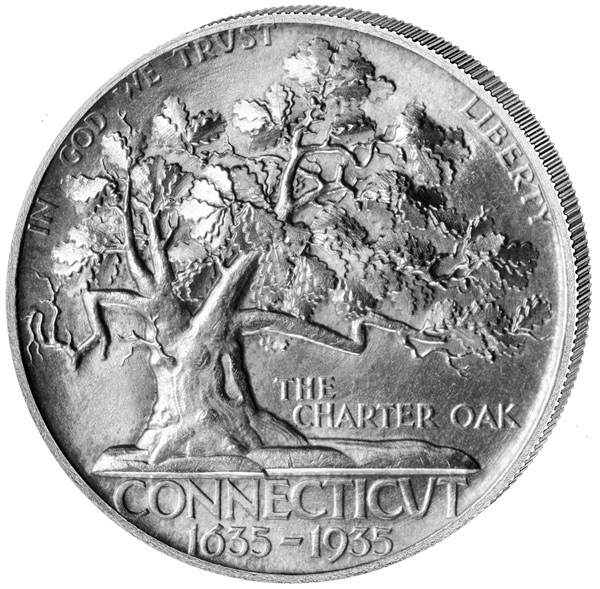
1935 Connecticut Commemorative half dollar

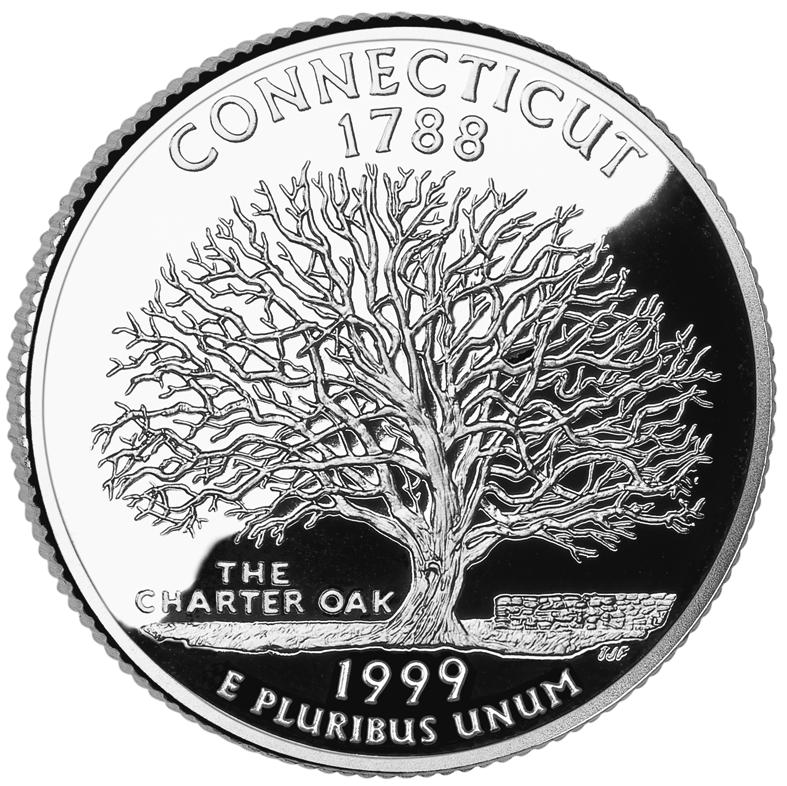
The Charter Oak on the 50 States Series Connecticut quarter (1999)

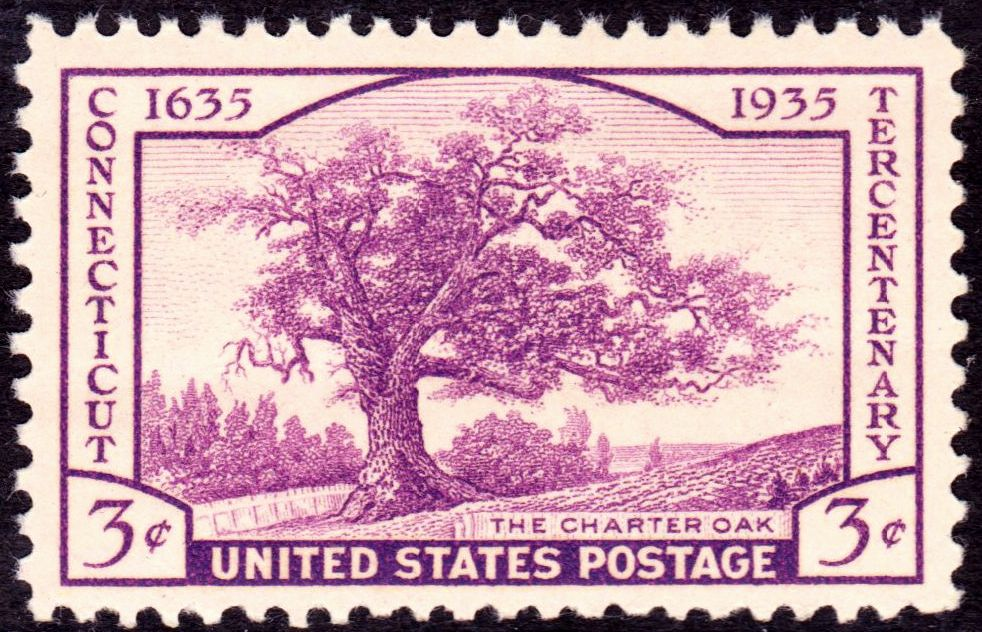
Connecticut 1935 tercentenary stamp

Speaker's Chair, CT State Capitol

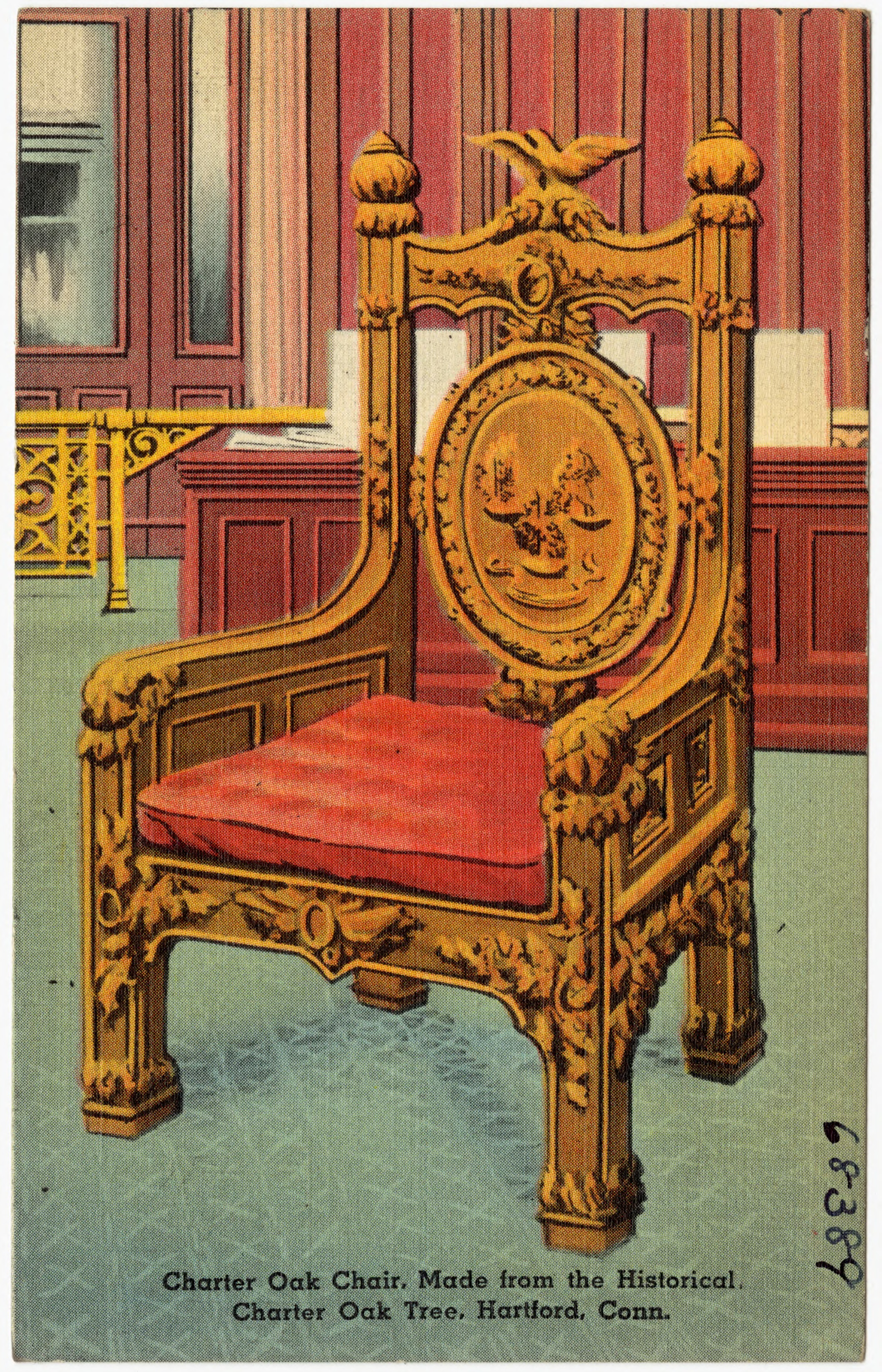
The Charter Oak Chair shown on a postcard

The oak was blown down by a violent, tempestuous storm on August 21, 1856, and its timber was used to make many chairs now displayed in the Hartford Capitol Building. The desk of the Governor of Connecticut and the chairs for the Speaker of the House of Representatives and President of the Senate in the state capitol were made from wood salvaged from the Charter Oak. Another chair was made by noted painter Frederic Church, a native of Hartford, and is still on display at his former home.

Charter Oak Engine Co. No. 1 presented a wooden baseball made from the Charter Oak to the Charter Oak Base Ball Club of Brooklyn on September 20, 1860.

Supporters of President Andrew Johnson presented him with a cane made from a branch of the oak in January 1868, as impeachment proceedings were underway.

In 1868, Mark Twain wrote of a trip that he took to Hartford and mused on the pride that his guide showed in the uses to which the lumber of the Charter Oak had been put:

Anything that is made of its wood is deeply venerated by the inhabitants, and is regarded as very precious. I went all about the town with a citizen whose ancestors came over with the Pilgrims in the Quaker City – in the Mayflower, I should say — and he showed me all the historic relics of Hartford. He showed me a beautiful carved chair in the Senate Chamber, where the bewigged and awfully homely old-time governors of the Commonwealth frown from their canvas overhead. "Made from Charter Oak," he said. I gazed upon it with inexpressible solicitude. He showed me another carved chair in the House, "Charter Oak," he said. I gazed again with interest. Then he looked at the rusty, stained, and famous old Charter, and presently I turned to move away. But he solemnly drew me back and pointed to the frame. "Charter Oak," said he. I worshipped. We went down to Wadsworth's Atheneum, and I wanted to look at the pictures; but he conveyed me silently to a corner, and pointed to a log, rudely shaped somewhat like a chair, and whispered, "Charter Oak." I exhibited the accustomed reverence. He showed me a walking stick, a needlecase, a dog-collar, a three-legged stool, a boot-jack, a dinner-table, a ten-pin alley, a toothpicker —

I interrupted him and said, "Never mind – we'll bunch the whole lumber-yard, and call it—"

"Charter Oak," he said.

"Well," I said, "now let us go and see some Charter Oak, for a change."

I meant that for a joke; But how was he to know that, being a stranger? He took me around and showed me Charter Oak enough to build a plank-road from here to Great Salt Lake City....

== Scions and descendants ==
Scions and descendants

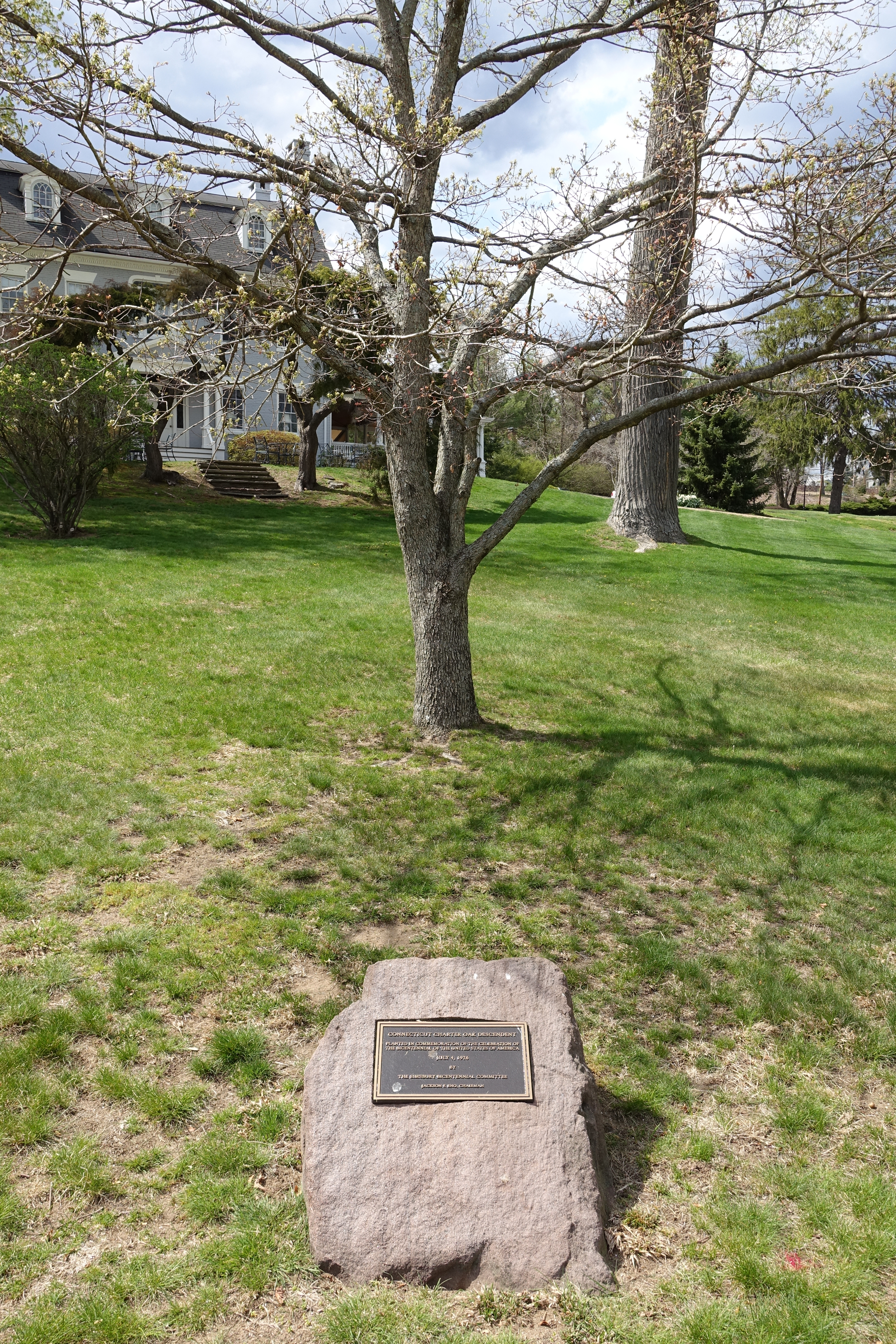
Charter Oak descendant in Simsbury

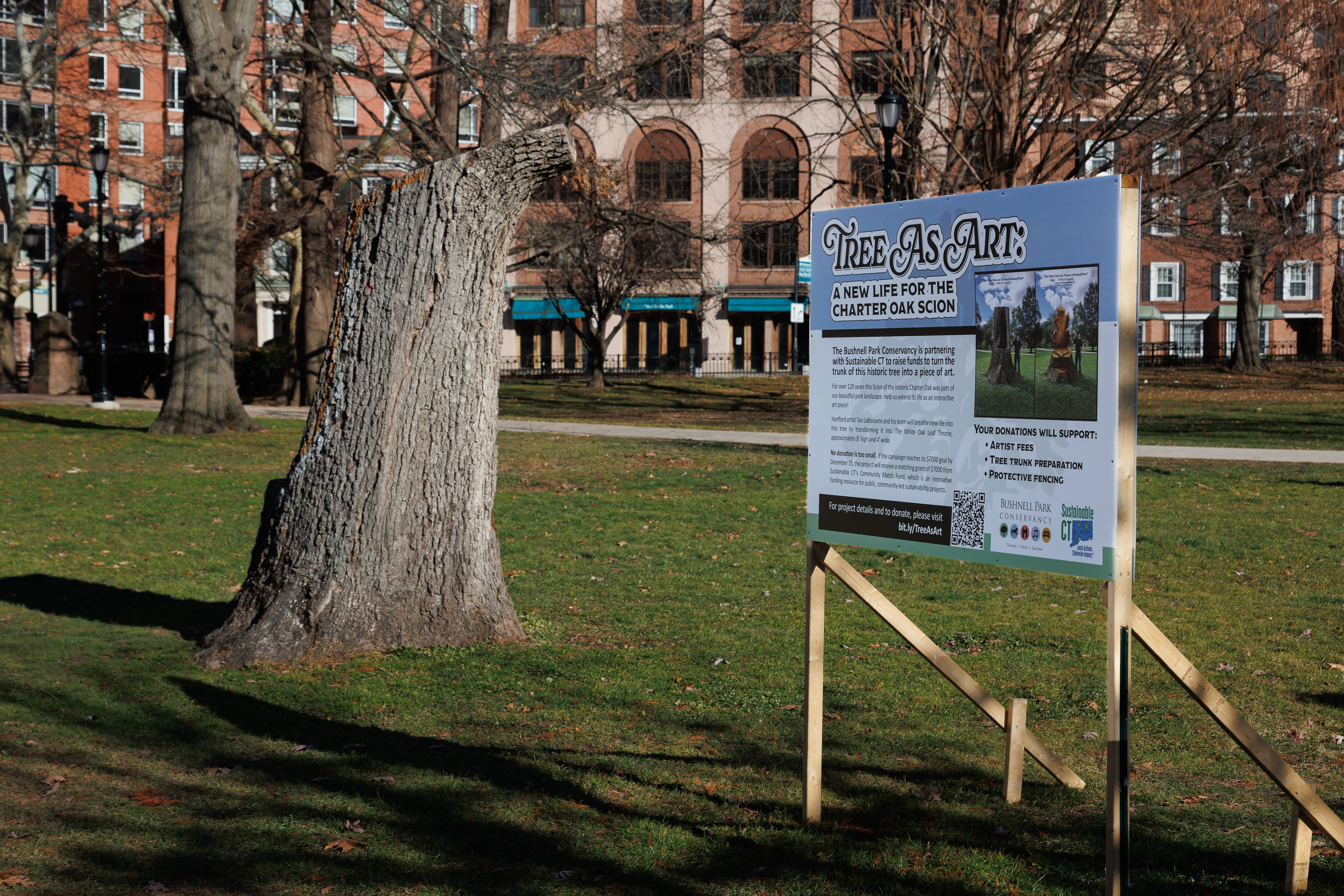
Stump of the Charter Oak Scion "Hoadley Oak" in Bushnell Park in 2023

Charter Oak fell during a storm on August 21, 1856, and residents collected many acorns and planted them in cities and towns across the state. These trees are known as "Charter Oak scions," and they were often planted in parks, town greens, cemeteries, and near post offices and town halls. Many of them are marked with plaques and monuments, but others are anonymous. The total number of Charter Oak scions is unknown, but was probably near 100.

As these scions grew to maturity, their acorns and seedlings were distributed around the state to mark civic occasions. Such occasions included George Washington's 200th birthday in 1932, the 300th anniversary of the charter in 1962, the new state constitution in 1965, and the national bicentennial in 1976. Each of these celebrations was marked by the distribution and planting of Charter Oak seedlings in Connecticut and elsewhere. Two were even sent to France and planted at the Versailles palace.

The Hoadley Oak is a Charter Oak scion in Hartford's Bushnell Park, estimated to be over 120 years of age. It was cut down by the city in February 2023 after "considerable rotting," perhaps due to an extended drought. A local artist plans to convert the remaining stump to an "interactive art piece".

== In literature ==
Lydia Sigourney published two poems on this tree. The first is Wyllys' Hill and the Charter Oak., in her 1827 collection of poetry. Here she remarks that this poem was occasioned by the death of the last proprietor of the name of Wyllys, in whose family this estate had remained since the country's first settlement. The second is The Charter-Oak, at Hartford., in Scenes in My Native Land (1845), which is accompanied by descriptive text.

== See also ==
- List of individual trees
