= Henry Kreis =

American sculptor (1899–1963)

- Born: July 27, 1899; Essen, Germany
- Died: January 22, 1963 (aged 63)
- Education: State School of Applied Arts in Munich
- Known for: sculpture

Henry Godfrey Kreis (July 27, 1899–January 22, 1963) was an American sculptor.

== Life ==
He studied at the State School of Applied Arts in Munich. In 1935 Kreis designed the Connecticut Tercentenary half dollar, then in 1936 he designed the Bridgeport, Connecticut, Centennial half dollar and the reverse of the Arkansas-Robinson half dollar.

In 1947, he created the Wise virgins and Foolish virgins medal for the Society of Medalists.
