= Donna Weaver =

American coin sculptor (born 1942)

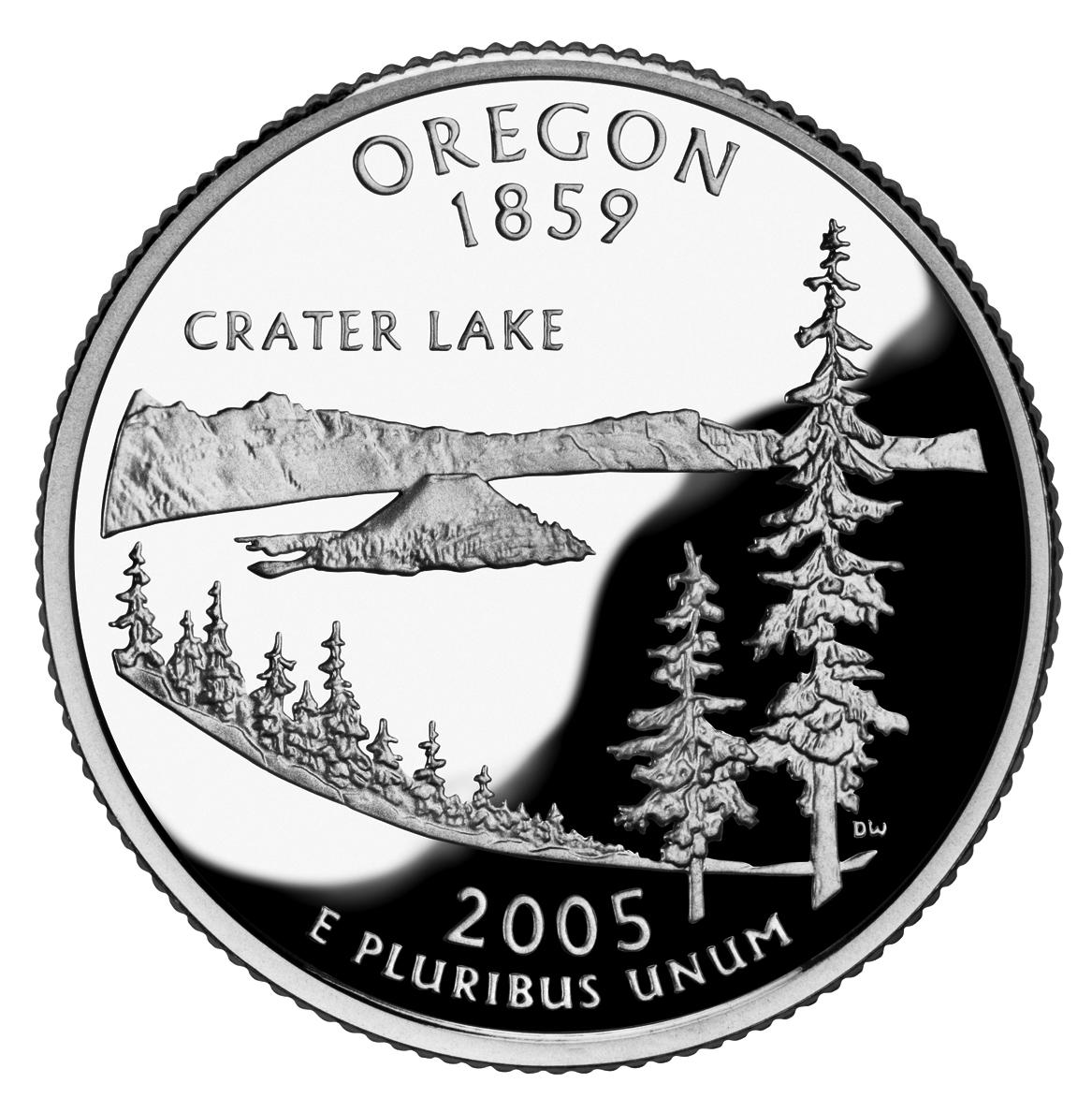
Weaver designed and engraved the reverses of several U.S. state quarters, including that of Oregon, depicting Crater Lake.

Donna Weaver (born 1942) is an American sculptor known for her designs of United States coins and medals. From 2000 to 2006, she worked as a sculptor-engraver for the United States Mint, where she designed seven state quarters, along with several commemorative coins. Weaver has since contributed to the Mint through the Artistic Infusion Program.

== Early life ==
Weaver was raised in Fort Mitchell, Kentucky, and attended the Art Academy of Cincinnati, where she studied painting and sculpting. She graduated with a Fine Arts degree in 1966.

== Career ==
Beginning in the 1970s, Weaver worked at Kenner, where she designed action figures and toys. She later worked for Gibson Greeting Cards, creating and designing greeting cards.

=== United States Mint ===
Weaver began working at the Philadelphia Mint in July 2000 as a sculptor-engraver. She designed and sculpted four of the five state quarters released in 2002: Indiana, Mississippi, Ohio, and Tennessee; and later designed and sculpted the Maine, Illinois, and Oregon state quarters. Weaver also sculpted the redesigned forward-facing obverse of the Jefferson nickel, which was designed by Jamie Franki. She also worked on designs for commemorative coins, including the Lewis & Clark Bicentennial silver dollar, the reverse of the Chief Justice John Marshall silver dollar, and the obverse of the Thomas Alva Edison silver dollar. In total, Weaver designed more than 30 coins and medals at the Mint.

=== Artistic Infusion Program ===
In 2007, Weaver was accepted into the Artistic Infusion Program (AIP) and continued to design models for the Mint as a contractor. Through the AIP, she modeled the Idaho, Montana, and Wyoming state quarters. Her design for the 10th Anniversary September 11th National Medal received praise. She would also design several of the reverses for the America the Beautiful quarters program, such as those representing Chaco Culture National Historical Park, Arches National Park, and Cumberland Island National Seashore.

== Personal life ==
Weaver lives in Vevay, Indiana. She volunteers at a living history museum at the Venoge Farmstead, where she serves as director.

She was married to Thomas Weaver, who died in December 2002.
