= Chief Justice John Marshall silver dollar =

2005 US commemorative coin

Chief Justice John Marshall dollar
- United States
- Value: 1 U.S. Dollar
- Mass: 26.730 g
- Diameter: 38.1 mm
- Thickness: 2.58 mm
- Edge: Reeded
- Composition: 90% Ag / 10% Cu
- Years of minting: 2005
- Mintage: 67,096 Uncirculated 196,753 Proof
- Mint marks: P
- Catalog number: KM# 375

Obverse
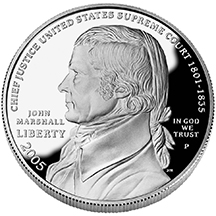
- Design: Chief Justice John Marshall, based on an 1808 portrait. Inscriptions: "Liberty", "In God We Trust", "Chief Justice United States Supreme Court 1801-1835", "John Marshall", & "2005"
- Designer: John Mercanti
- Design date: 2005

Reverse
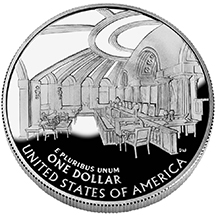
- Design: Depiction of the Old Supreme Court Chamber inside the Capitol. Inscriptions: "United States of America", "One Dollar", & "E Pluribus Unum"
- Designer: Donna Weaver
- Design date: 2005

The Chief Justice John Marshall silver dollar is a commemorative silver dollar issued by the United States Mint in 2005. It depicts former Chief Justice John Marshall and was issued to commemorate the 250th anniversary of Marshall's birth in 1755.

== Design ==
Nineteen different designs inspired by various representations of Marshall were submitted by United States Mint engravers for his depiction on the obverse. The selected design depicts a profile of John Marshall based on a 1808 engraving by the French portrait artist Charles Balthazar Julien Févret de Saint-Mémin and was designed by John Mercanti. The reverse, designed by Donna Weaver, shows the interior of the Old Supreme Court Chamber within the Capitol during the time Marshall was a justice.

== Production and distribution ==
Both uncirculated and proof pieces were struck. The coins were issued on June 27, 2005. A $10 surcharge for each coin sold was donated to the Supreme Court Historical Society. Mintage totaled 67,096 for uncirculated sets and 196,753 for proof sets for a total of 263,849 coins minted, well under the 400,000 maximum authorized by law.

== See also ==
- United States commemorative coins
- List of United States commemorative coins and medals (2000s)
