= Samuel H. Fisher =

Samuel Herbert Fisher (May 26, 1867 – 1957) was an American attorney and print historian. He was a member of the Acorn Club, to which he was elected in 1933. Fisher was a fellow of the Yale Corporation (1920–1935) and chaired the Connecticut Tercentenary Commission. He received honorary degrees from Yale University, Colgate University, and Wesleyan University.

== Works ==
- The Publications of Thomas Collier Printer 1784-1808 (Litchfield: Litchfield Historical Society, 1933)
