= 50 State quarters =

Series of US coins

50 State quarter
- United States
- Value: 0.25 US Dollar
- Mass: 6.25 (Ag); 5.67 (Cu-Ni) g
- Diameter: 24.26 mm (0.955 in)
- Thickness: 1.75 mm (0.069 in)
- Edge: 119 reeds
- Composition: 91.67% Cu 8.33% Ni (standard); 90% Ag 10% Cu (proof only)
- Years of minting: 1999–2008
- Mint marks: P, D, S (proof only)

Obverse
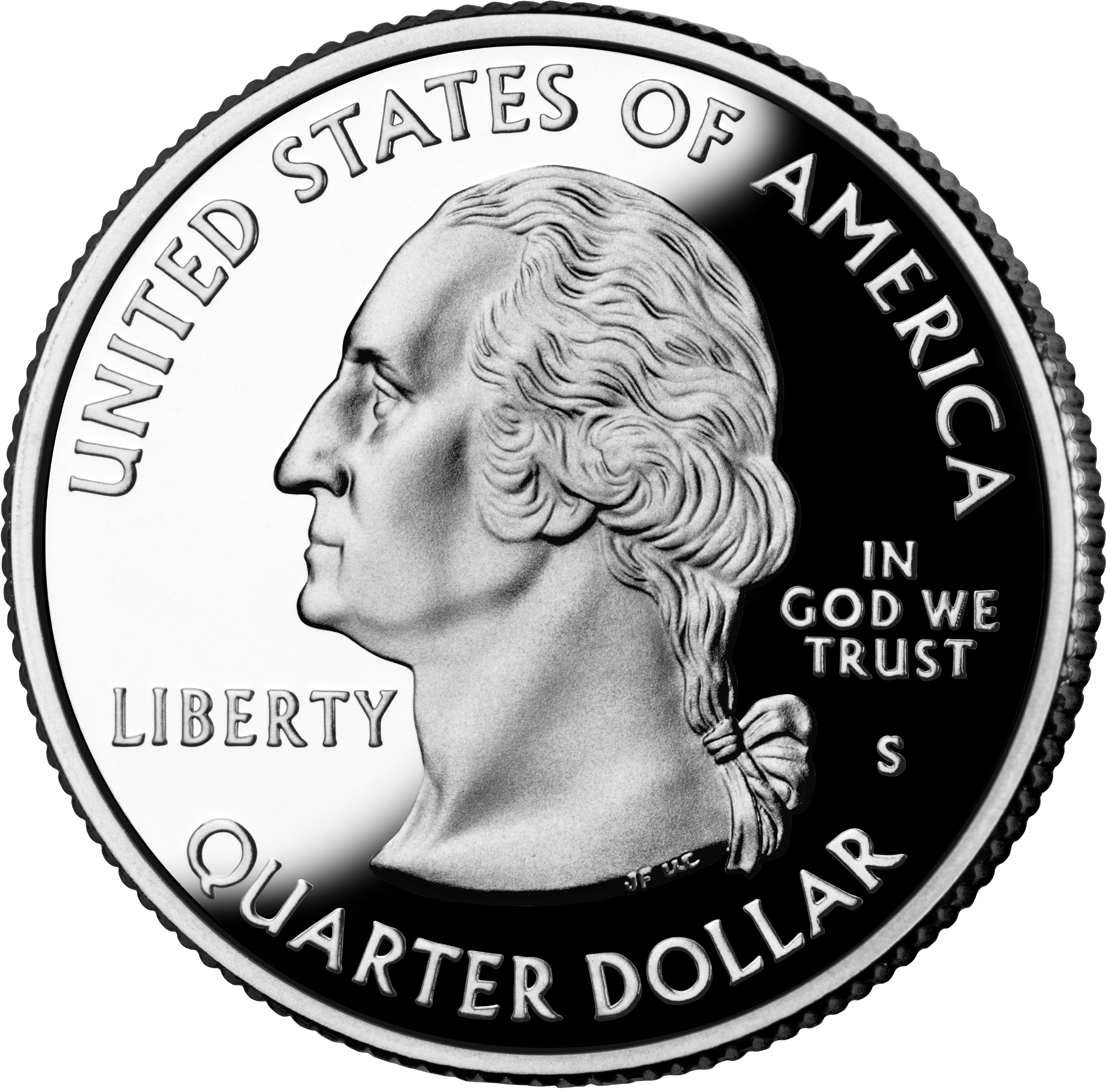
- Design: George Washington
- Designer: John Flanagan (1932 version) from a 1786 bust by Houdon / William Cousin (modification to Flanagan's design)
- Design date: 1999

Reverse
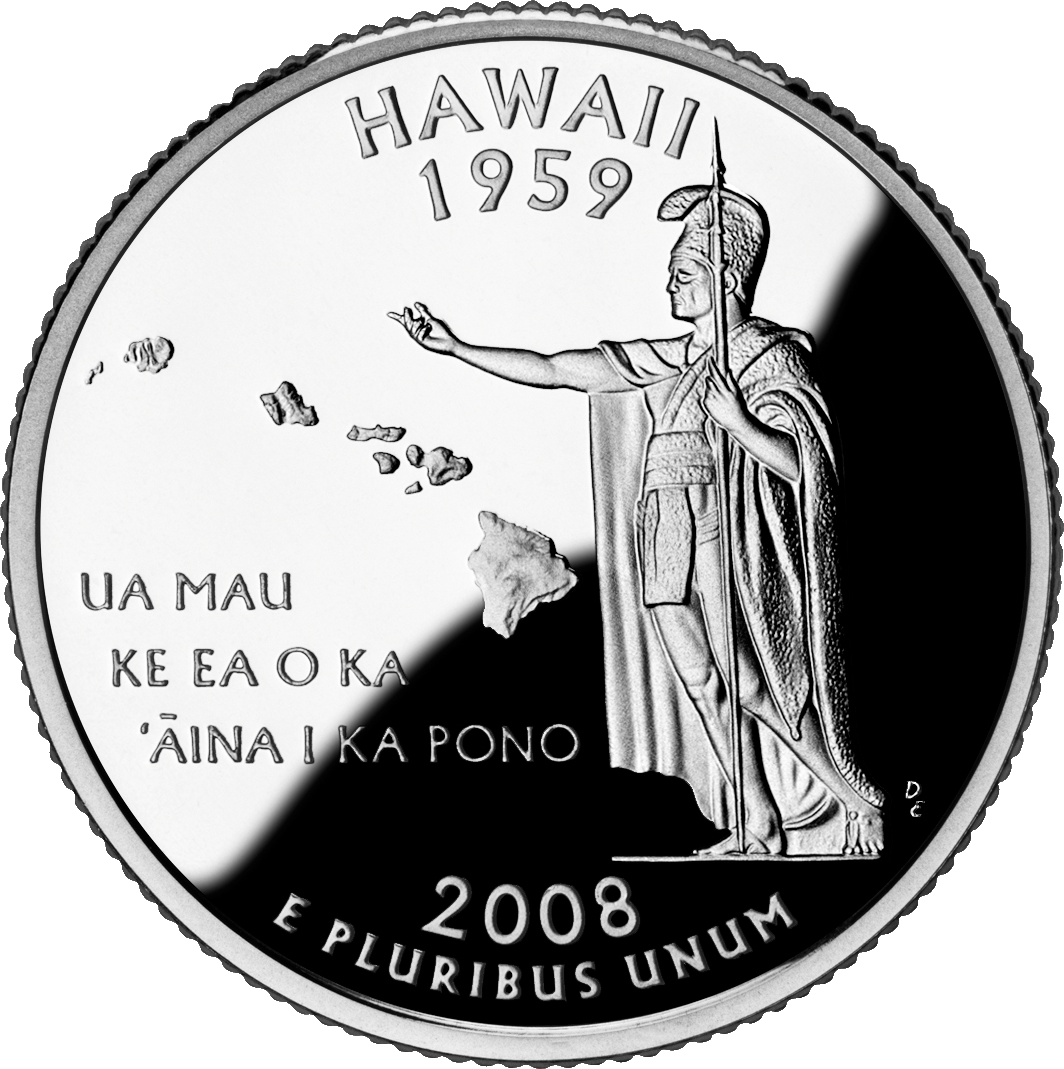
- Design: various; five designs per year (latest shown)
- Designer: various
- Design date: 1999–2008

The 50 State quarters (authorized by Pub. L. 105–124 (text) (PDF), 111 Stat. 2534, enacted December 1, 1997) were a series of circulating commemorative quarters released by the United States Mint. Minted from 1999 through 2008, they featured unique designs for each of the 50 US states on the reverse.

The 50 State Quarters Program was started to support a new generation of coin collectors, and it became the most successful numismatic program in US history, with roughly half of the US population collecting the coins, either in a casual manner or as a serious pursuit. The US federal government so far has made additional profits of $3 billion from collectors taking the coins out of circulation.

In 2009, the US Mint began issuing quarters under the 2009 District of Columbia and US Territories Program. The Territories Quarter Program was authorized by the passage of a newer legislative act, H.R. 2764. This program features the District of Columbia, Puerto Rico, American Samoa, Guam, the United States Virgin Islands, and the Northern Mariana Islands.

== Origins ==
The 50 State Quarters program was initially inspired by a 1992 Royal Canadian Mint program, "Canada 125", marking the 125th anniversary of the country's Confederation with a series of commemorative 25-cent pieces representing each of its 12 (at the time) provinces and territories. The Canada 125 program sparked a revival of interest in coin collecting among Canadians, which led American numismatists to advocate for the United States Mint to create a similar series of coins representing U.S. states.

In 1992, Congress passed the 1996 Atlanta Centennial Olympic Games Commemorative Coin Act. In addition to authorizing a series of commemorative coins marking the 1996 Summer Olympics, the law also established the Citizens Commemorative Coin Advisory Committee (CCCAC) to consider ideas for future releases. After Treasury Secretary Lloyd Bentsen appointed the committee in December 1993, several of its members, led by David Ganz, urged the committee to endorse a state quarters program. Initially, Ganz found support from only Charles Atherton, from the Federal Commission on Fine Arts, and Dan Hoffman, a young numismatist from South Carolina who also served on the CCCAC. However, by 1995, the CCCAC finally endorsed the idea. The committee then sought the support of Representative Michael Castle (R-Delaware), chairman of the House Banking subcommittee with jurisdiction over the nation's coinage. Castle's initial caution was resolved when Diehl suggested the coins be issued in the order the states entered the Union or ratified the Constitution. Delaware, Castle's home state, was the first state to ratify the Constitution, and would thus get to be the first state to have its quarter released. Castle subsequently held hearings and filed legislation to authorize the program.

Despite the support of the director of the mint and the Treasury Secretary-appointed CCCAC, the Treasury Department opposed the 50 States Quarters Program, as commemorative coinage had come to be identified with abuses and excesses. The Mint's economic models estimated the program would earn the government between $2.6 billion and $5.1 billion in additional seignorage and $110 million in additional numismatic profits. Diehl and Castle used these profit projections to urge the Treasury's support, but Treasury officials found the projections to lack credibility (at the program's conclusion, the Mint estimated the program had earned $3 billion in additional seignorage and $136.2 million in additional numismatic profits).

Diehl worked with Castle behind the scenes to move legislation forward despite the Treasury's opposition to the program. However, the Treasury suggested to Castle that the department should conduct a study to determine the feasibility of the program. With Diehl's advice, Castle accepted the Treasury's offer, and the agreement was codified in the United States Commemorative Coin Act of 1996. The act also authorized the Secretary to proceed with the 50 States Quarters Program without further congressional action if the results of the feasibility study were favorable.

The Treasury Department engaged the consulting firm Coopers and Lybrand to conduct the study in 1997, which confirmed the Mint's demand, seignorage, and numismatic profit projections for the program. Among other conclusions, the study found that 98 million Americans were likely to save one or more full sets of the quarters (at the program's conclusion, the Mint estimated that 147 million Americans collected the 50 state quarters). Nevertheless, the Treasury Department continued to oppose the program and declined to proceed with it without a congressional mandate to do so.

In 1997, Congress issued that mandate in the form of S. 1228, the 50 States Commemorative Coin Program Act, which was signed into law by President Bill Clinton on December 1, 1997.

== 50 State Quarters Program ==
The 50 State quarters were released by the United States Mint every ten weeks, or five each year. They were released in the same order that the states ratified the Constitution or were admitted to the Union. Each quarter's reverse commemorated one of the 50 states with a design emblematic of its unique history, traditions, and symbols. Certain design elements, such as state flags, images of living persons, and head-and-shoulder images of deceased persons were prohibited.

The authorizing legislation and Mint procedures gave each state a substantial role and considerable discretion in determining the design that would represent their state. The majority of states followed a process by which the governor solicited the state's citizens to submit design concepts and appointed an advisory group to oversee the process. Governors submitted three to five finalist design concepts to the Secretary of the Treasury for approval. Approved designs were returned to the states for selection of a final design.

States usually employed one of two approaches in making this selection. In 33 states, the governor selected the final recommended design, often based on the recommendations of advisory groups and citizens. In the other 17 states, citizens selected the final design through online, telephone, mail, or other public votes. US Mint engravers applied all final design concepts approved by the Treasury Secretary. The media and public attention surrounding this process and the release of each state's quarter was intense and produced significant publicity for the program.

In several cases, the process of creating and finalizing a design caused controversy in the represented state, with people and groups expressing disappointment that the design did not properly reflect their state. There were disputes over which state could lay claim to certain design elements that appeared in other states, such as an ear of corn or the Rocky Mountains. The Mint's conversion of each state's proposal into the final design that was used on the quarter also drew criticism for being overly simplified or poorly rendered. Paul Jackson, whose design was chosen for the Missouri quarter and then pared down by the Mint, led a series of protests which included placing stickers with Jackson's original design on the reverses of 250,000 quarters and distributing them nationwide. In response to these criticisms, the Mint established the Artistic Infusion Program in 2003, hiring more professional artists and engravers to create better-looking designs for all commemorative coins.

The 50 State Quarters Program was the most popular commemorative coin program in the United States history; the United States Mint has estimated that 147 million Americans have collected state quarters and 3.5 million participated in the selection of state quarter designs.

By the end of 2008, all of the original 50 States quarters had been minted and released. The official total, according to the US Mint, was 34,797,600,000 coins. The average mintage was 695,952,000 coins per state, but ranged from Virginia's 1,594,616,000 to Oklahoma's 416,600,000. Demand was stronger for quarters issued early in the program. This was due to weakening economic conditions in later years and the waning of the initial surge of demand when the program was launched. Another factor was the reassertion of the Treasury Department's opposition to the program. When the director's term ended in 2000, the Treasury proceeded to reduce and finally terminate the most effective elements of the Mint's promotional program despite the high return on investment they earned.

== Designs ==
Year	No.	State	Release date (statehood date)	Design	Elements depicted	Engraver	Mintage		
Year	No.	State	Release date (statehood date)	Design	Elements depicted	Engraver	Philadelphia	Denver	San Francisco
1999	1	Delaware	January 1, 1999 (December 7, 1787)	Delaware quarter	Caesar Rodney on horseback Captions: "The First State", "Caesar Rodney"	William Cousins	373,400,000	401,424,000	3,713,359 (proof); 804,565 (silver proof)
1999	2	Pennsylvania	March 8, 1999 (December 12, 1787)	Pennsylvania quarter	Commonwealth statue, state outline, keystone symbol Caption: "Virtue, Liberty, Independence"	John Mercanti	349,000,000	358,332,000	3,713,359 (proof); 804,565 (silver proof)
1999	3	New Jersey	May 17, 1999 (December 18, 1787)	New Jersey quarter	Washington Crossing the Delaware, which includes George Washington (standing) and James Monroe (holding the flag); Caption: "Crossroads of the Revolution"	Alfred Maletsky	363,200,000	299,028,000	3,713,359 (proof); 804,565 (silver proof)
1999	4	Georgia	July 19, 1999 (January 2, 1788)	Georgia quarter	Peach, live oak (state tree) sprigs, state outline Banner with text: "Wisdom, Justice, Moderation" (the state motto)	T. James Ferrell	451,188,000	488,744,000	3,713,359 (proof); 804,565 (silver proof)
1999	5	Connecticut	October 12, 1999 (January 9, 1788)	Connecticut quarter	Charter Oak; Caption: "The Charter Oak"	T. James Ferrell	688,744,000	657,880,000	3,713,359 (proof); 804,565 (silver proof)
2000	6	Massachusetts	January 3, 2000 (February 6, 1788)	Massachusetts quarter	The Minute Man statue, state outline Caption: "The Bay State"	Thomas D. Rogers	628,600,000	535,184,000	4,020,172 (proof); 965,421 (silver proof)
2000	7	Maryland	March 13, 2000 (April 28, 1788)	Maryland quarter	Dome of the Maryland State House, white oak (state tree) clusters Caption: "The Old Line State"	Thomas D. Rogers	678,200,000	556,532,000	4,020,172 (proof); 965,421 (silver proof)
2000	8	South Carolina	May 22, 2000 (May 23, 1788)	South Carolina quarter	Carolina wren (state bird), yellow jessamine (state flower), cabbage palmetto (state tree), state outline Caption: "The Palmetto State"	Thomas D. Rogers	373,400,000	401,424,000	4,020,172 (proof); 965,421 (silver proof)
2000	9	New Hampshire	August 7, 2000 (June 21, 1788)	New Hampshire quarter	Old Man of the Mountain, nine stars (representing New Hampshire as the 9th state to ratify the U.S. Constitution); Captions: "Old Man of the Mountain", "Live Free or Die"	William Cousins	673,040,000	495,976,000	4,020,172 (proof); 965,421 (silver proof)
2000	10	Virginia	October 16, 2000 (June 25, 1788)	Virginia quarter	Ships Susan Constant, Godspeed, Discovery; Captions: "Jamestown, 1607–2007", "Quadricentennial"	Edgar Z. Steever	943,000,000	651,616,000	4,020,172 (proof); 965,421 (silver proof)
2001	11	New York	January 2, 2001 (July 26, 1788)	New York quarter	Statue of Liberty, 11 stars (representing New York as the 11th state to ratify the U.S. Constitution), state outline with line tracing Hudson River and Erie Canal; Caption: "Gateway to Freedom"	Alfred Maletsky	619,640,000	655,400,000	3,094,140 (proof); 889,697 (silver proof)
2001	12	North Carolina	March 12, 2001 (November 21, 1789)	North Carolina quarter	Wright Flyer, John T. Daniels's iconic photo of the Wright brothers Caption: "First Flight"	John Mercanti	627,600,000	427,876,000	3,094,140 (proof); 889,697 (silver proof)
2001	13	Rhode Island	May 21, 2001 (May 29, 1790)	Rhode Island quarter	America's Cup yacht Reliance on Narragansett Bay, Claiborne Pell Newport Bridge; Caption: "The Ocean State"	Thomas D. Rogers	423,000,000	447,100,000	3,094,140 (proof); 889,697 (silver proof)
2001	14	Vermont	August 6, 2001 (March 4, 1791)	Vermont quarter	Maple trees with sap buckets, Camel's Hump Mountain; Caption: "Freedom and Unity"	T. James Ferrell	423,400,000	459,404,000	3,094,140 (proof); 889,697 (silver proof)
2001	15	Kentucky	October 15, 2001 (June 1, 1792)	Kentucky quarter	Thoroughbred racehorse behind fence, Bardstown mansion, Federal Hill; Caption: "My Old Kentucky Home"	T. James Ferrell	353,000,000	370,564,000	3,094,140 (proof); 889,697 (silver proof)
2002	16	Tennessee	January 2, 2002 (June 1, 1796)	Tennessee quarter	Fiddle, trumpet, guitar, musical score, three stars Banner with text: "Musical Heritage"	Donna Weaver	361,600,000	286,468,000	3,084,245 (proof); 892,229 (silver proof)
2002	17	Ohio	March 11, 2002 (March 1, 1803)	Ohio quarter	Wright Flyer III (built by the Wright Brothers who were from Dayton); astronaut; state outline Caption: "Birthplace of Aviation Pioneers"	Donna Weaver	217,200,000	414,832,000	3,084,245 (proof); 892,229 (silver proof)
2002	18	Louisiana	May 20, 2002 (April 30, 1812)	Louisiana quarter	Brown pelican (state bird); trumpet with musical notes, outline of Louisiana Purchase on map of US; Caption: "Louisiana Purchase"	John Mercanti	362,000,000	402,204,000	3,084,245 (proof); 892,229 (silver proof)
2002	19	Indiana	August 2, 2002 (December 11, 1816)	Indiana quarter	IndyCar, state outline, 19 stars (representing Indiana as the 19th state to join the Union); Caption: "Crossroads of America"	Donna Weaver	362,600,000	327,200,000	3,084,245 (proof); 892,229 (silver proof)
2002	20	Mississippi	October 15, 2002 (December 10, 1817)	Mississippi quarter	Two magnolia blossoms (state flower); Caption: "The Magnolia State"	Donna Weaver	290,000,000	289,600,000	3,084,245 (proof); 892,229 (silver proof)
2003	21	Illinois	January 2, 2003 (December 3, 1818)	Illinois quarter	Young Abraham Lincoln; farm scene; Chicago skyline; state outline; 21 stars, 11 on left edge and 10 on right Captions: "Land of Lincoln;" "21st state/century"	Donna Weaver	225,800,000	237,400,000	3,408,516 (proof); 1,125,755 (silver proof)
2003	22	Alabama	March 17, 2003 (December 14, 1819)	Alabama quarter	Helen Keller, seated, longleaf pine (state tree) branch, magnolia blossoms Banner with text: "Spirit of Courage"; Caption: "Helen Keller" in standard print and Braille	Norman E. Nemeth	225,000,000	232,400,000	3,408,516 (proof); 1,125,755 (silver proof)
2003	23	Maine	June 2, 2003 (March 15, 1820)	Maine quarter	Pemaquid Point Lighthouse; the schooner Victory Chimes at sea	Donna Weaver	217,400,000	231,400,000	3,408,516 (proof); 1,125,755 (silver proof)
2003	24	Missouri	August 4, 2003 (August 10, 1821)	Missouri quarter	Gateway Arch, Lewis and Clark and York returning down Missouri River; Caption: "Corps of Discovery 1804–2004"	Alfred Maletsky	225,000,000	228,200,000	3,408,516 (proof); 1,125,755 (silver proof)
2003	25	Arkansas	October 20, 2003 (June 15, 1836)	Arkansas quarter	Diamond (state gem), rice stalks, mallard flying above a lake	John Mercanti	228,000,000	229,800,000	3,408,516 (proof); 1,125,755 (silver proof)
2004	26	Michigan	January 26, 2004 (January 26, 1837)	Michigan quarter	State outline, outline of Great Lakes system Caption: "Great Lakes State"	Donna Weaver	233,800,000	225,800,000	2,740,684 (proof); 1,769,786 (silver proof)
2004	27	Florida	March 29, 2004 (March 3, 1845)	Florida quarter	Spanish galleon, Sabal palmetto (state tree), Space Shuttle; Caption: "Gateway to Discovery"	T. James Ferrell	240,200,000	241,600,000	2,740,684 (proof); 1,769,786 (silver proof)
2004	28	Texas	June 1, 2004 (December 29, 1845)	Texas quarter	State outline, star, lariat Caption: "The Lone Star State"	Norman E. Nemeth	278,800,000	263,000,000	2,740,684 (proof); 1,769,786 (silver proof)
2004	29	Iowa	August 30, 2004 (December 28, 1846)	Iowa quarter	Schoolhouse, teacher and students planting a tree; based on the Grant Wood painting Arbor Day; Captions: "Foundation in Education", "Grant Wood"	John Mercanti	213,800,000	251,400,000	2,740,684 (proof); 1,769,786 (silver proof)
2004	30	Wisconsin	October 25, 2004 (May 29, 1848)	Wisconsin quarter	Head of a cow, round of cheese and ear of corn (state grain). Banner with text: "Forward"	Alfred Maletsky	226,400,000	226,800,000	2,740,684 (proof); 1,769,786 (silver proof)
2005	31	California	January 31, 2005 (September 9, 1850)	California quarter	John Muir, California condor, Half Dome; Captions: "John Muir," "Yosemite Valley"	Don Everhart	257,200,000	263,200,000	3,262,960 (proof); 1,678,649 (silver proof)
2005	32	Minnesota	April 4, 2005 (May 11, 1858)	Minnesota quarter	Common loon (state bird), fishing, state outline Caption: "Land of 10,000 Lakes"	Charles L. Vickers	239,600,000	248,400,000	3,262,960 (proof); 1,678,649 (silver proof)
2005	33	Oregon	June 6, 2005 (February 14, 1859)	Oregon quarter	Crater Lake National Park; Caption: "Crater Lake"	Donna Weaver	316,200,000	404,000,000	3,262,960 (proof); 1,678,649 (silver proof)
2005	34	Kansas	August 29, 2005 (January 29, 1861)	Kansas quarter	American bison (state mammal), sunflowers (state flower)	Norman E. Nemeth	263,400,000	300,000,000	3,262,960 (proof); 1,678,649 (silver proof)
2005	35	West Virginia	October 14, 2005 (June 20, 1863)	West Virginia quarter	New River Gorge Bridge; Caption: "New River Gorge"	John Mercanti	365,400,000	356,200,000	3,262,960 (proof); 1,678,649 (silver proof)
2006	36	Nevada	January 31, 2006 (October 31, 1864)	Nevada quarter	Mustangs, mountains, rising sun, sagebrush (state flower); Banner with text: "The Silver State"	Don Everhart	277,000,000	312,800,000	2,882,428 (proof); 1,585,008 (silver proof)
2006	37	Nebraska	April 3, 2006 (March 1, 1867)	Nebraska quarter	Chimney Rock National Historic Site, Conestoga wagon Caption: "Chimney Rock"	Charles L. Vickers	318,000,000	276,400,000	2,882,428 (proof); 1,585,008 (silver proof)
2006	38	Colorado	June 14, 2006 (August 1, 1876)	Colorado quarter	Longs Peak; Banner with text: "Colorful Colorado"	Norman E. Nemeth	274,800,000	294,200,000	2,882,428 (proof); 1,585,008 (silver proof)
2006	39	North Dakota	August 28, 2006 (November 2, 1889)	North Dakota quarter	American bison, badlands	Donna Weaver	305,800,000	359,000,000	2,882,428 (proof); 1,585,008 (silver proof)
2006	40	South Dakota	November 6, 2006 (November 2, 1889)	South Dakota quarter	Mount Rushmore, ring-necked pheasant (state bird), wheat (state grass)	John Mercanti	245,000,000	265,800,000	2,882,428 (proof); 1,585,008 (silver proof)
2007	41	Montana	January 29, 2007 (November 8, 1889)	Montana quarter	American bison skull in the center with mountains and the Missouri River in the background. Caption: "Big Sky Country"	Don Everhart	257,000,000	265,240,000	2,374,778 (proof); 1,313,481 (silver proof)
2007	42	Washington	April 2, 2007 (November 11, 1889)	Washington quarter	Salmon leaping in front of Mount Rainier; Caption: "The Evergreen State"	Charles L. Vickers	265,200,000	280,000,000	2,374,778 (proof); 1,313,481 (silver proof)
2007	43	Idaho	June 4, 2007 (July 3, 1890)	Idaho quarter	Peregrine falcon, state outline with star indicating location of state capital Boise, Idaho; Caption: "Esto Perpetua"	Don Everhart	294,600,000	286,800,000	2,374,778 (proof); 1,313,481 (silver proof)
2007	44	Wyoming	September 4, 2007 (July 10, 1890)	Wyoming quarter	Bucking Horse and Rider; Caption: "The Equality State"	Norman E. Nemeth	243,600,000	320,800,000	2,374,778 (proof); 1,313,481 (silver proof)
2007	45	Utah	November 5, 2007 (January 4, 1896)	Utah quarter	Golden spike, Locomotives Jupiter, No. 119, and the completion of the Transcontinental Railroad; Caption: "Crossroads of the West"	Joseph F. Menna	255,000,000	253,200,000	2,374,778 (proof); 1,313,481 (silver proof)
2008	46	Oklahoma	January 28, 2008 (November 16, 1907)	Oklahoma quarter	Scissor-tailed flycatcher (state bird), with Indian blankets (state wildflower) in background	Phebe Hemphill	222,000,000	194,600,000	2,078,112 (proof); 1,192,908 (silver proof)
2008	47	New Mexico	April 7, 2008 (January 6, 1912)	New Mexico quarter	State outline with relief, Zia sun symbol from flag Caption: "Land of Enchantment"	Don Everhart	244,200,000	244,400,000	2,078,112 (proof); 1,192,908 (silver proof)
2008	48	Arizona	June 2, 2008 (February 14, 1912)	Arizona quarter	Grand Canyon, saguaro cactus closeup. Banner with text: "Grand Canyon State"	Joseph F. Menna	244,600,000	265,000,000	2,078,112 (proof); 1,192,908 (silver proof)
2008	49	Alaska	August 25, 2008 (January 3, 1959)	Alaska quarter	Grizzly bear with salmon (state fish) and North Star; Caption: "The Great Land"	Charles L. Vickers	251,800,000	254,000,000	2,078,112 (proof); 1,192,908 (silver proof)
2008	50	Hawaii	November 3, 2008 (August 21, 1959)	Hawaii quarter	Statue of Kamehameha I with state outline and motto Caption: "Ua Mau ke Ea o ka ʻĀina i ka Pono"	Don Everhart	254,000,000	263,600,000	2,078,112 (proof); 1,192,908 (silver proof)

== Additional notes on individual designs ==
- Alabama: The Alabama state quarter is the first coin circulated in the US that features Braille writing.
- Arizona: The banner reading "Grand Canyon State" in the design is intended to split the quarter into two sections and indicate the Grand Canyon and the saguaro cactus are in two different Arizona scenes, as the saguaro cactus is not native to the area near the Grand Canyon.
- Connecticut: The Charter Oak on the reverse of the Connecticut quarter fell during a storm on August 21, 1856. It also appears on a 1936 half dollar commemorating the 300th anniversary of the state's settlement by Europeans.
- Georgia: The outline of the state of Georgia on the quarter appears to have accidentally left out Dade County, which is in the extreme northwestern part of the state. In 1860, Dade residents voted to secede from the United States and from the state of Georgia. The county's secession was never legally recognized, and Dade residents chose to "rejoin" the United States in 1945.
- Hawaii: The Hawaii quarter features a rendition of the statue of King Kamehameha I, who united the Hawaiian Islands in 1810, with the state outline and motto. This is the first business strike US coin to feature royalty or a monarch of any kind.
- Illinois: The Illinois quarter is the only quarter to directly reference and portray an urban city, with a picture of the Chicago skyline (the Missouri quarter indirectly references the city of St. Louis with its portrayal of the iconic Gateway Arch).
- Indiana: The Indiana quarter—having a problem similar to Georgia's quarter—is missing part of its northwestern corner. Lake County is either partially or completely missing (where it borders with Lake Michigan). The error did not garner considerable notice.
- Iowa: When Iowans were debating the design for its state quarter in 2002, there was a grassroots effort to use a design featuring the Sullivan brothers (to honor the five Waterloo siblings who died when the ship they were aboard—the USS Juneau (CL-52)—sank during the Naval Battle of Guadalcanal, 1942). The effort was ultimately unsuccessful, and a Grant Wood design was used, but not before some copyright issues were resolved.
- Maryland: The Maryland Statehouse featured on the coin is the country's largest wooden dome built without nails. Some residents complained that the quarter did not feature the state's famous blue crab.
- Missouri: The design contest winner for the Missouri quarter, Paul Jackson, has claimed that the Mint engraver needlessly redesigned Jackson's original submission. The Mint stated that Jackson's design was not coinable, but a private mint later demonstrated that it was. It emerged that Mint engravers may exercise discretion in the final design of US coinage, and the term "design contest" was dropped from solicitations for ideas for later state quarters.
- Nebraska: One of the final concepts for the Nebraska quarter was based on the Ponca leader Standing Bear, who, in a suit brought against the federal government, successfully argued that Native Americans were citizens entitled to rights under the US Constitution.
- New Hampshire: The Old Man of the Mountain, featured on the back of the New Hampshire quarter, collapsed in 2003, less than three years after the quarter's release.
- New Jersey. The first coin in history to ever depict George Washington on both sides.
- Ohio: Astronauts John Glenn, Neil Armstrong, James Lovell, and Judith Resnik were all natives of Ohio, as were the Wright Brothers.
- Oregon: Oregon's design features a scene of Crater Lake and Wizard Island. This design was chosen by the Oregon Commemorative Quarter Commission. The Quarter Commission was made up of 18 members, including Governor Ted Kulongoski, State Treasurer Randall Edwards, Columbia Sportswear Chairperson Gert Boyle, numismatist Monte Mensing, and Beaverton High School student Laura Davis, along with state legislators Charles Starr, Joan Dukes, Betsy Johnson, and Betsy Close, among others. The Quarter Commission chose the Crater Lake design from three other finalists: a jumping salmon, the Oregon Trail, and Mount Hood.
- Rhode Island: With a mast height of 199 ft (61m) the yacht Reliance could not have sailed under the Claiborne Pell Newport Bridge, which has a clearance below of 188 ft (57m), although the coin does not show the ship sailing under the bridge. This would also not have happened because Reliance was sold for scrap in 1913 and the Pell Bridge opened in 1969.
- South Dakota: Although South Dakota has the second highest proportion of Native Americans of any state, the South Dakota quarter features three items that are the result of European settlement. These symbols are Mount Rushmore, which honors four U.S. presidents and is carved into the Black Hills which are seen as sacred by the Lakota, a ring-necked pheasant (an introduced species of Asian origin), and wheat, a Eurasian crop which has replaced much of the state's native grasslands.
- Tennessee: There has also been some controversy over the Tennessee quarter. Some sources claim that the details on the instruments depicted on the quarter are inaccurate, such as the number of strings on the guitar and the location of the tubing on the trumpet. The number of strings on the guitar-like instrument would be accurate if the instrument was a Mexican vihuela that influenced the country-and-western music prominent in Nashville culture and business.
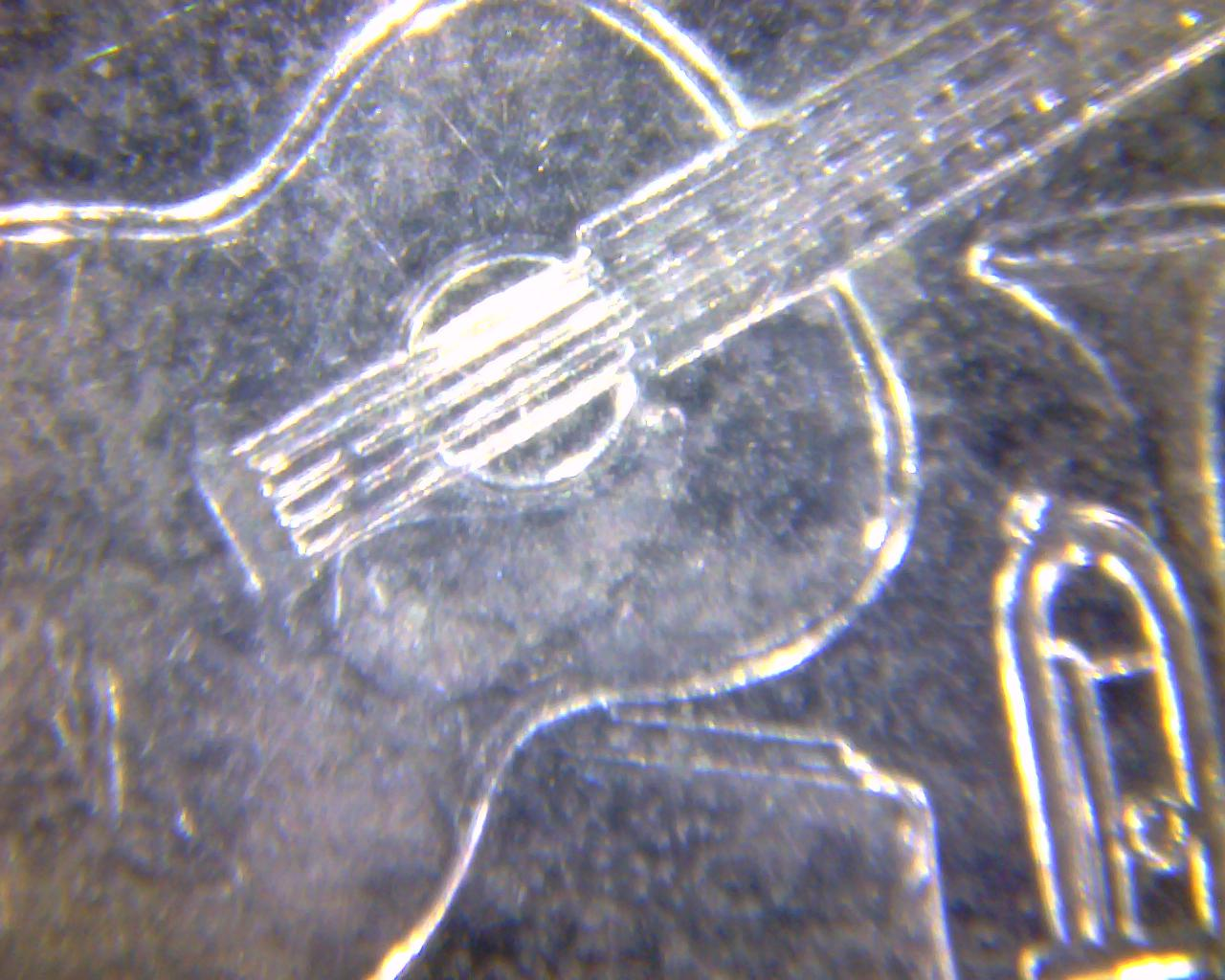
  5 strings on the guitar on the Tennessee state quarter.
  The instrument, however, has six tuning pegs, so is, in fact, a guitar and not a vihuela.
- West Virginia: During the submission process for the design of the West Virginia quarter, there was an apparent movement to put the famous Mothman on the final design.
- Wisconsin: There are two known misprints in circulation, both featuring an extra leaf on the corn stalk in different configurations. Theories for how this happened range from accidental mint error to deliberate modification. The average value for one of these misprints is $250 to $300
- Wyoming: Some Wyoming quarters were released in 2007 with indications of improper quality control. Many persons, upon first seeing the same cowboy outline design used on the state's automobile license plates, have mistakenly believed that the lack of detail is itself a flaw, the result of an incomplete striking. However, evidence of cracks in the die and subsequent hasty repairs have been observed in a few circulation specimens.

== Year map ==
The following map shows the years each state, federal district, or territory was released as a state quarter.

The following table has the quarters grouped by year.
Color	Year	1st release	2nd release	3rd release	4th release	5th release	6th release
	1999	Delaware	Pennsylvania	New Jersey	Georgia	Connecticut	—N/a
	2000	Massachusetts	Maryland	South Carolina	New Hampshire	Virginia	—N/a
	2001	New York	North Carolina	Rhode Island	Vermont	Kentucky	—N/a
	2002	Tennessee	Ohio	Louisiana	Indiana	Mississippi	—N/a
	2003	Illinois	Alabama	Maine	Missouri	Arkansas	—N/a
	2004	Michigan	Florida	Texas	Iowa	Wisconsin	—N/a
	2005	California	Minnesota	Oregon	Kansas	West Virginia	—N/a
	2006	Nevada	Nebraska	Colorado	North Dakota	South Dakota	—N/a
	2007	Montana	Washington	Idaho	Wyoming	Utah	—N/a
	2008	Oklahoma	New Mexico	Arizona	Alaska	Hawaii	—N/a
	2009	District of Columbia	Puerto Rico	Guam	American Samoa	US Virgin Islands	Northern Mariana Islands

== Collectible value ==
In 1997, Congress passed the 50 States Commemorative Coin Program Act, which instructed the creation of the 50 State quarters series to "honor the unique Federal Republic of 50 States that comprise the United States; and to promote the diffusion of knowledge among the youth of the United States about the individual states, their history and geography, and the rich diversity of the national heritage...", and to encourage "young people and their families to collect memorable tokens of all of the States for the face value of the coins."

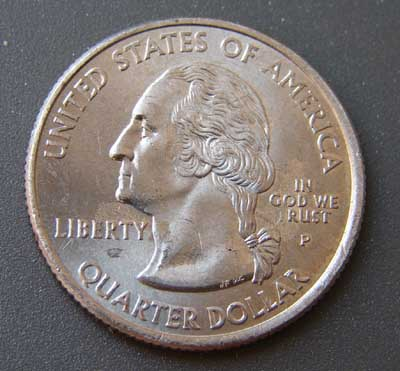
Coin with partially rubbed off "In God We Trust" motto

While mintage totals of the various designs vary widely—Virginia quarters are almost 20 times as abundant as the Northern Marianas quarters—none of the regular circulating issues are rare enough to become a valuable investment.

There was, however, a measure of collector interest over die errors in the Wisconsin quarter. Some designs from the Denver mint feature corn without a smaller leaf, others feature a small leaf pointing upwards, and still others have the leaf bending down. A set of all three quarters sold on eBay in February 2005 for $300 and initially saw significant increases, such as $1500 for individual coins, but as of February 2020 PCGS lists the value of MS-62 specimens from $92 to $130 each.

Another die cast error ran with the first Delaware quarters. Being the first model of state quarter made, the mint gave it a disproportionate weight causing vending machines to not accept it. The quarter die was quickly fixed. Some Delaware quarters appeared without the last E, now saying, "THE FIRST STAT". There also exists a die crack on the Delaware known as the "spitting horse" variety, which is caused by a die crack near the horses' mouth, resembling a horse spitting.

A major error occurred in 2000 when the reverse die of a Sacagawea dollar was combined with the obverse die of a state quarter on dollar-coin planchets to form what is known as a "mule". As of August 2019, only 19 of these specimens, produced on dollar planchets, are known to have escaped from the Mint.

A 2005 Minnesota double die quarter, as well as a 2005 Minnesota quarter with extra trees (another die error), have both triggered numismatic interest. An unusual die break on some 2005 Kansas quarters created a humpback bison. Relatively more common are Kansas quarters bearing the motto "IN GOD WE RUST."

The United States produces proof coinage in circulating base metal and, since 1992, in separately sold sets with the dimes, quarters, and half-dollars in silver. For the silver issues, the 1999 set is the most valuable, being the first year of the series and with a relatively small mintage, although prices have significantly decreased since the 50 State Quarters Program ended. The set in base metal, of this or any other year, is worth only a fraction as much. The silver proof sets of later years, while having some intrinsic and collector worth, are also priced far lower. The public is cautioned to research prices before buying advertised state quarter year or proof sets.

In general, the program increased interest in quarter and general coin collecting. Large numbers of advertisements, quarter products and quarter information were available during the years the program ran. Home Shopping Network, Franklin Mint, and Littleton Coin Company were among the most prominent in advertising space.

== Seigniorage ==
Since the 50 State Quarters Program was expected to increase public demand for quarters which would be collected and taken out of circulation, the Mint used economic models to estimate the additional seigniorage the program would produce. These estimates established a range of $2.6 billion to $5.1 billion. (At the end of the program, the Mint estimated the actual increase in seigniorage to be $3 billion.) The Mint also estimated the program would earn $110 million in additional numismatic profits. (The final, post-program estimate was $136.2 million.) The Mint used these estimates to support the proposed program, and the legislation enacting the 50 States Quarters program cited these estimates.

== Satire ==
- On July 25, 2001, The Onion ran a satirical news story titled "Collecting All 50 State Quarters Senior's Only Reason To Remain Alive". On May 4, 2005, it ran a further story titled "U.S. Mint Gears Up To Issue Commemorative County Pennies".
- The Late Night with Conan O'Brien television show aired several segments about fictional satirical designs for new state quarters.
- Sculptor Daniel Carr, whose designs were used for the New York and Rhode Island state quarters and whose concept was adapted for the Maine state quarter, has created a series of parody quarters making light of the state quarter concept.

== See also ==
- District of Columbia and United States Territories quarters
- America the Beautiful quarters
- Westward Journey Nickel Series
- Presidential dollar coins
- American Innovation dollars
- United States Bicentennial coinage
- German Bundesländer €2 coins
- Canadian 125th Anniversary provincial quarters
- 60th Anniversary of Enforcement of the Local Autonomy Law 500 yen commemorative coins

== Bibliography ==
- Yeoman, R.S. (2014). Bressett, Kenneth (ed.). A Guide Book of United States Coins 2015 (68th ed.). Atlanta, Georgia: Whitman Publishing. ISBN 978-079484215-4. OCLC 875521690. OL 28306197M.

Preceded by Washington quarter	50 State quarters (1999–2008)	Succeeded by District of Columbia and United States Territories quarters
