= Renato Signorini =

Italian sculptor

Renato Signorini (Asmara, 29 August 1902 – Rome, 30 December 1966) was an Italian sculptor, painter and medalist.

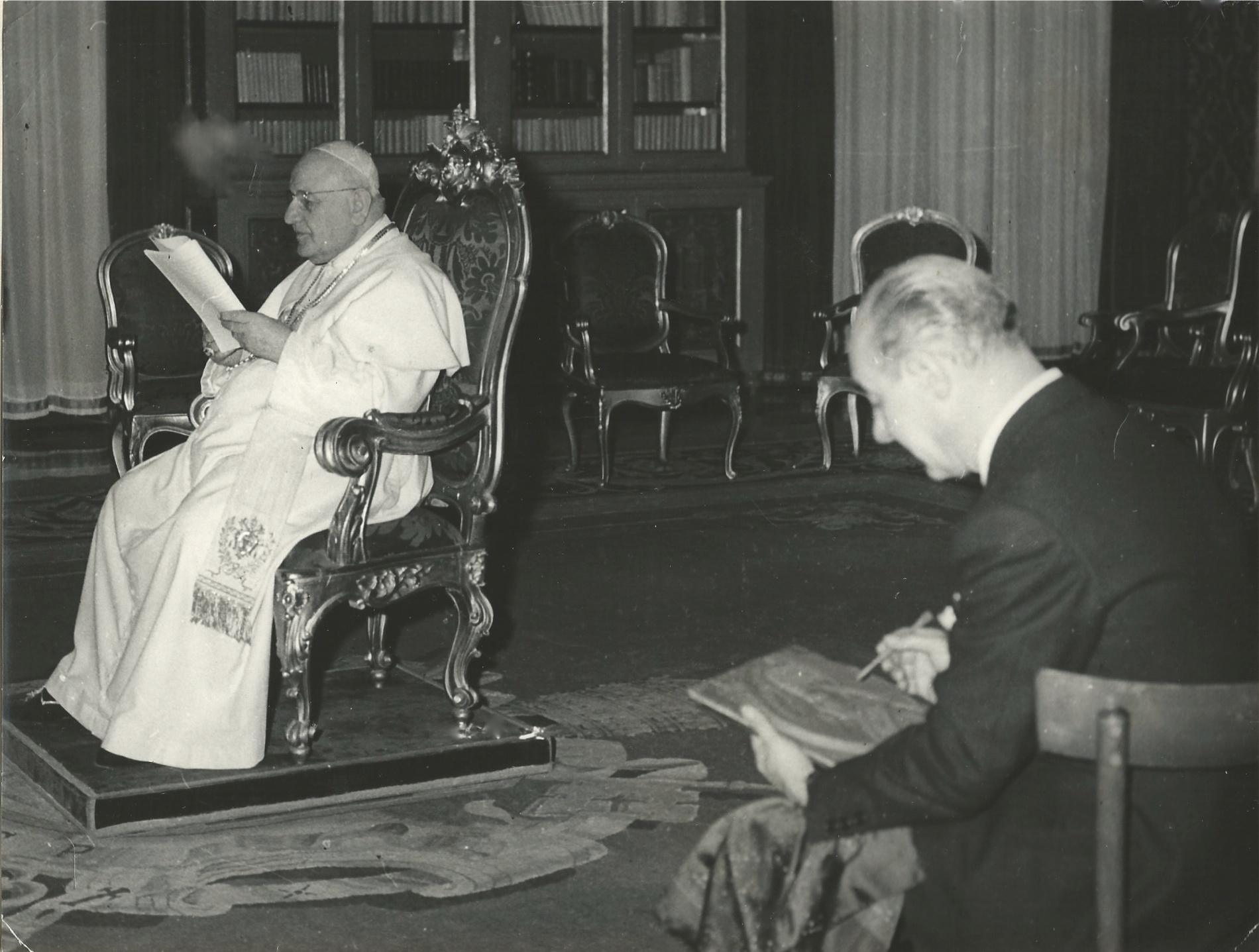
Renato Signorini while sculpts the portrait of Pope John XXIII to commemorate his coronation in 1958. The same portrait will be used, in reduced form, to coin a medal.

== Biography ==
Renato Signorini was known for his sculpted heads in silver, vermeil, glazed or gilded bronze and occasionally gold, portraying popes, monarchs and actresses. The sculptures, obtained using the so-called cire perdue casting technique, were later polished and often decorated with gems and semi-precious stones. Generally, the portraits were small half-length busts, depicting the subject in a front head pose gazing distantly, with simple and neat details, as inspired by the Tuscan renaissance portraiture. Or else, they were carved in bas-relief on medals and medallions.

He was also the owner of the Hotel Flora, situated along the via Veneto in Rome.

On 11 September 1930 he married the Sicilian writer Livia De Stefani, daughter of a family of landowners, with whom he had three children. He died from leukemia in Rome on 30 December 1966.

== Work ==
Signorini’s career started in 1937, as declared by the artist himself in his personal file now kept at the "Fondazione La Quadriennale di Roma". He was the pupil of the sculptor Aurelio Mistruzzi in the "Scuola dell'Arte della Medaglia", inside the Mint of Rome.

In 1945 he sculpted a bust in Carrara marble (cm. 80 x 70 x 35) portraying Filippo De Grenet, a victim of the Fosse Ardeatine massacre by the German occupation troops in Rome. The work is currently located in the "Sala delle Galere" at Palazzo Chigi in Rome.

In November 1948 he took part in the "Great Exhibition of Italian Art" in Pretoria, as reported by the artist himself in his personal file kept at the Fondazione La Quadriennale di Roma.

In 1948 he also participated in Rome V Quadrennial Exhibition – at the National Gallery of Modern Art – with his "Portrait of Ms Lever". He exhibited at several art galleries, in Italy and abroad, among which: Galleria Giosi, Rome (1954); in the Galleria Montenapoleone, Milan (1955); O’Hana Gallery, London (1956); Sagittarius Art Gallery, New York, and its branch in Rome (1957). In 1958 he exhibited in Palm Springs, at the Venetian Room of the Tennis Club (Desert Sun, December 2, 1958) and in 1959 at the Pasadena Museum (San Martino Tribune, April 16, 1959).

A major event took place in 1957, when 45 of his works were exhibited at Tiffany & Co., 727 5th Avenue, New York. Among them, the portraits of: Pope Pius XII; Clare Boothe Luce (1903-1987), ambassador of the United States to Italy in the 50s; Princess Isabelle Colonna; Audrey Hepburn; Queen Elizabeth II (New York Times, 9 October 1957). The works on display also included a small bust of Queen Soraya, a mantel designed for the Tokyo opera season, a Chiang Kai-shek commemorative medal, more than 10 drawings. The opening ceremony was held by the Italian Consul General in New York, baron Carlo De Ferrariis Salzano (Pacific Stars and Stripes, 10 October 1957, p. 9). The introduction of the catalogue was by the writer James Albert Michener (New York 1907 – Austin 1977).

Signorini obtained many commissions in the United States. Among them: the small bust of Mona Williams von Bismark (1897-1983), considered as an American fashion icon; the bust of Ms. Cowles, the wife of editor Gardner "Mike" Cowles (1903-1985), depicted wearing some of her favourite jewels in miniature. His works were on display at the Sun Lounge of the Beverly Hills Hotel, Los Angeles, in October 1958 (Anderson Herald Bulletin 20/10/1958) and then in San Francisco, Dallas, New Orleans, Paris, Madrid and Johannesburg.

He carved a commemorative medal, among others, to celebrate the IV centenary of the foundation of the city of São Paulo in Brazil in 1954, the golden medal issued by the Italian Institute of Numismatics on the occasion of Rome Olympic Games in 1960, and the commemorative medal on the occasion of the Paris "Exhibition of Italian Medal" in 1965. He also sculpted medium-size bas-reliefs depicting religious subjects and small madonnas, besides sculptures of animals.

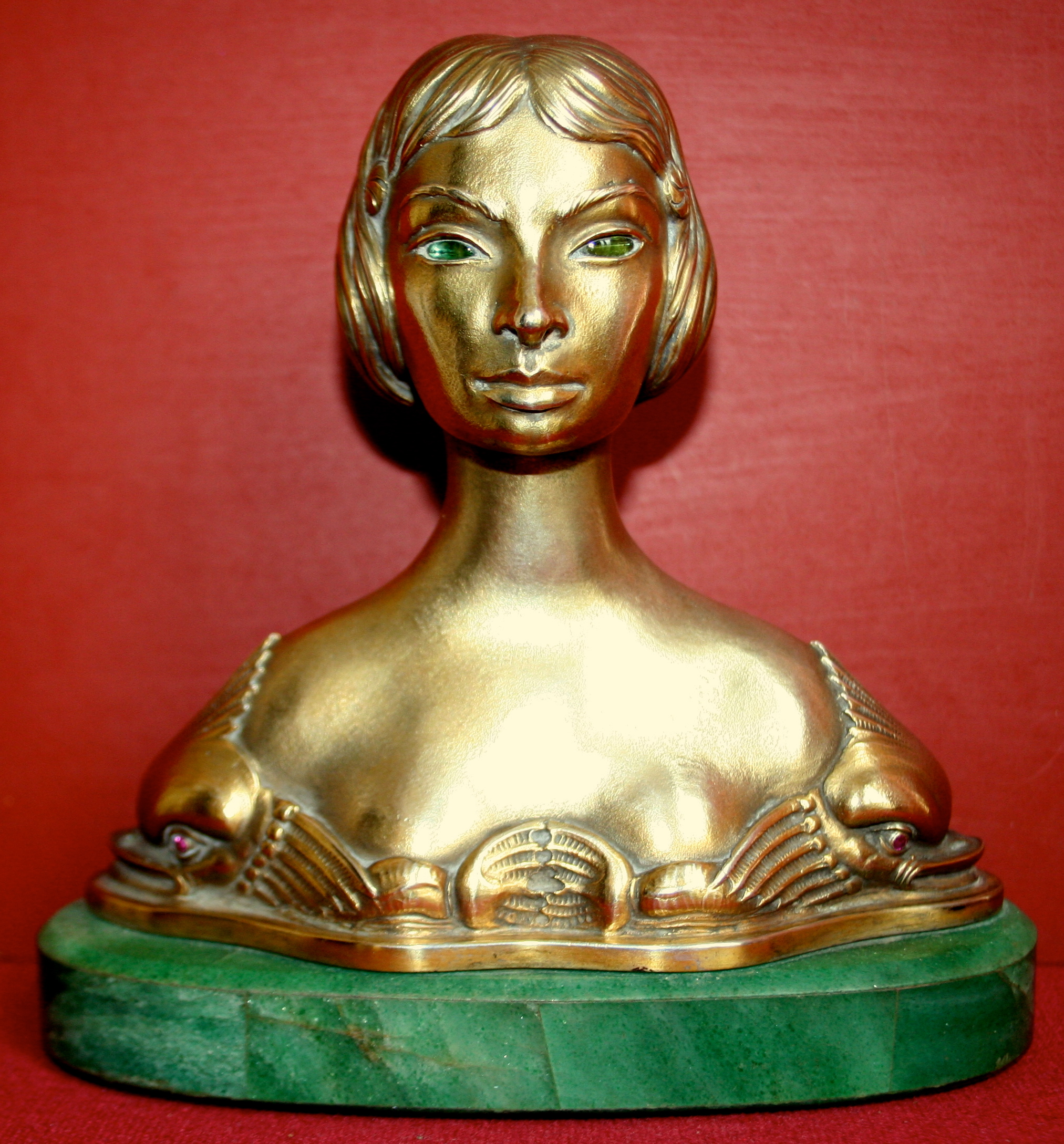
Bust of Soraya Esfandiary-Bakhtiary, Queen of Iran

Among the famous characters portrayed by Signorini, it is worth mentioning Pope Pius XII, whose portrait in gold and gems is currently kept in the Vatican City, as declared by the artist himself in his personal file now kept at the "Fondazione La Quadriennale di Roma"; Sophia Loren; Grace Kelly; Soraya Esfandiary-Bakhtiary, the second wife of the last Shah of Persia, Shah Mohammad Reza Pahlavi; Pope John XXIII; Cardinal Ernesto Ruffini. In the collection of the Patrick and Beatrice Haggerty Museum of Art of Milwaukee, in the United States of America, there is a silver bas-relief of Pope John XXIII.

He was a member of the Academy of the Mediterranean, as reported in the Archives "Giovanni Alliata di Montereale", the historical archives of the Italian House of representatives, and he was adviser to the sculpture section, in the "Movimento della pittura di piccolo formato", of which he was part and with which he exhibited his smallest works. He was also in the advisory board in the AIAM, Associazione Italiana dell’Arte della Medaglia (Italian Association of the Art of the Medal), from the beginning of its establishment, in 1963.

His only pupil and assistant ("The Argus", Fremont California, Thursday 5 January 1967, p. 11) was the American medalist Elizabeth Jones (Montclair, USA, 1934).

His works are signed R. SIGNORINI or SIGNORINI, in block letters, even if sometimes the signature is missing.

He is not to be confused with the homonymous mosaicist from Ravenna, Renato Signorini (1908-1999).

== Photo gallery ==
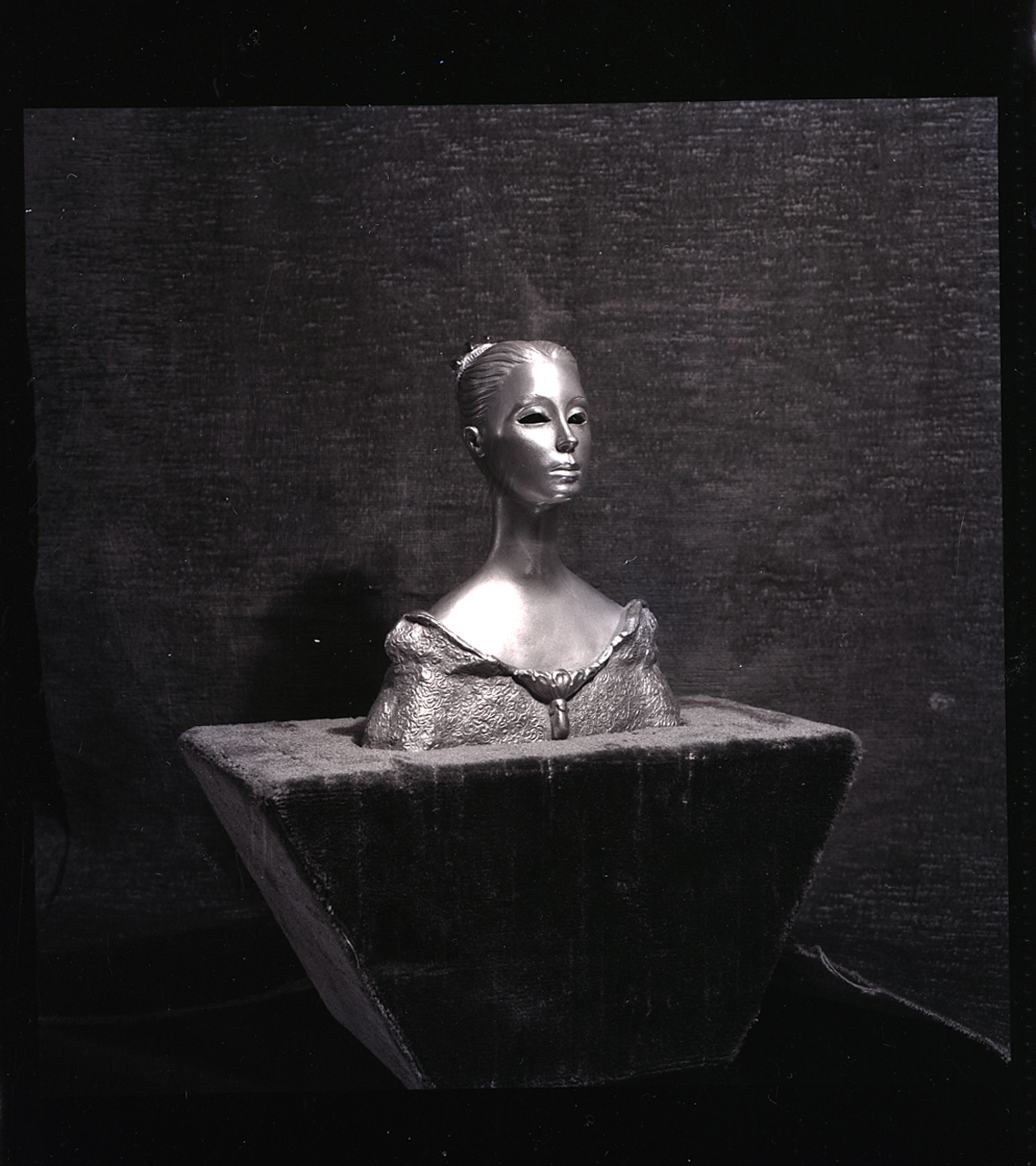
Bust of woman. Photo by Paolo Monti, 1960.

== Publications ==
- Catalog of the "Rassegna Nazionale di Arti Figurative", Rome, Istituto Grafico Tiberino, 1948, pp. 78, tavv. CXXXIV.
- "Storia del movimento della pittura di piccolo formato - La Tavoletta dal 1950 al 1954", Gruppo Internazionale dei Tavolettisti, De Luca Editore, Rome, 1954.
- "This Week Magazine", The Salt Lake Tribune, 12 agosto 1956, story by Louis Berg, with, in the cover, Audrey Hepburn's bust by Signorini.
- "Capitoli su Renato Signorini", James A. Michener, Indro Montanelli, Giorgio de Chirico, Alfredo Mezio and others, La Rocca editore, Rome, 1957.
- Catalog of the exhibition held at "Tiffany", New York, James Albert Michener, 1957.
- "Modern Medallions", Elizabeth Jones, Renato Signorini, Montclair Art Museum, USA, Art Museum ed., 1966.
- "Il Covile" - Rivista aperiodica diretta da Stefano Borselli, story "Ritratti di attrici" by Gabriella Rouf, 2015. Il Covile n° 839
- "Il Covile" - Rivista aperiodica diretta da Stefano Borselli, story "Lusinghieri aggiornamenti su Renato Signorini", pp. 3, 2016. Il Covile n° 903
