= The New Colossus =

Sonnet by Emma Lazarus, inscribed at the Statue of Liberty

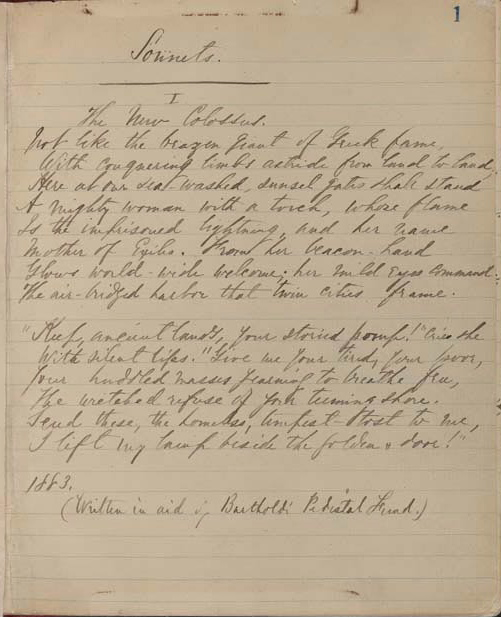
- Emma Lazarus's manuscript for "The New Colossus"
- Created: 1883
- Location: Statue of Liberty, Liberty Island, New York City
- Author: Emma Lazarus
- Purpose: To raise money for construction of the statue's pedestal

Full text
- The New Colossus at Wikisource

"The New Colossus" is a sonnet by American poet Emma Lazarus (1849–1887). She wrote the poem in 1883 to raise money for the construction of a pedestal for the Statue of Liberty (Liberty Enlightening the World). In 1903, the poem was cast onto a bronze plaque and mounted inside the pedestal's lower level.

== History ==
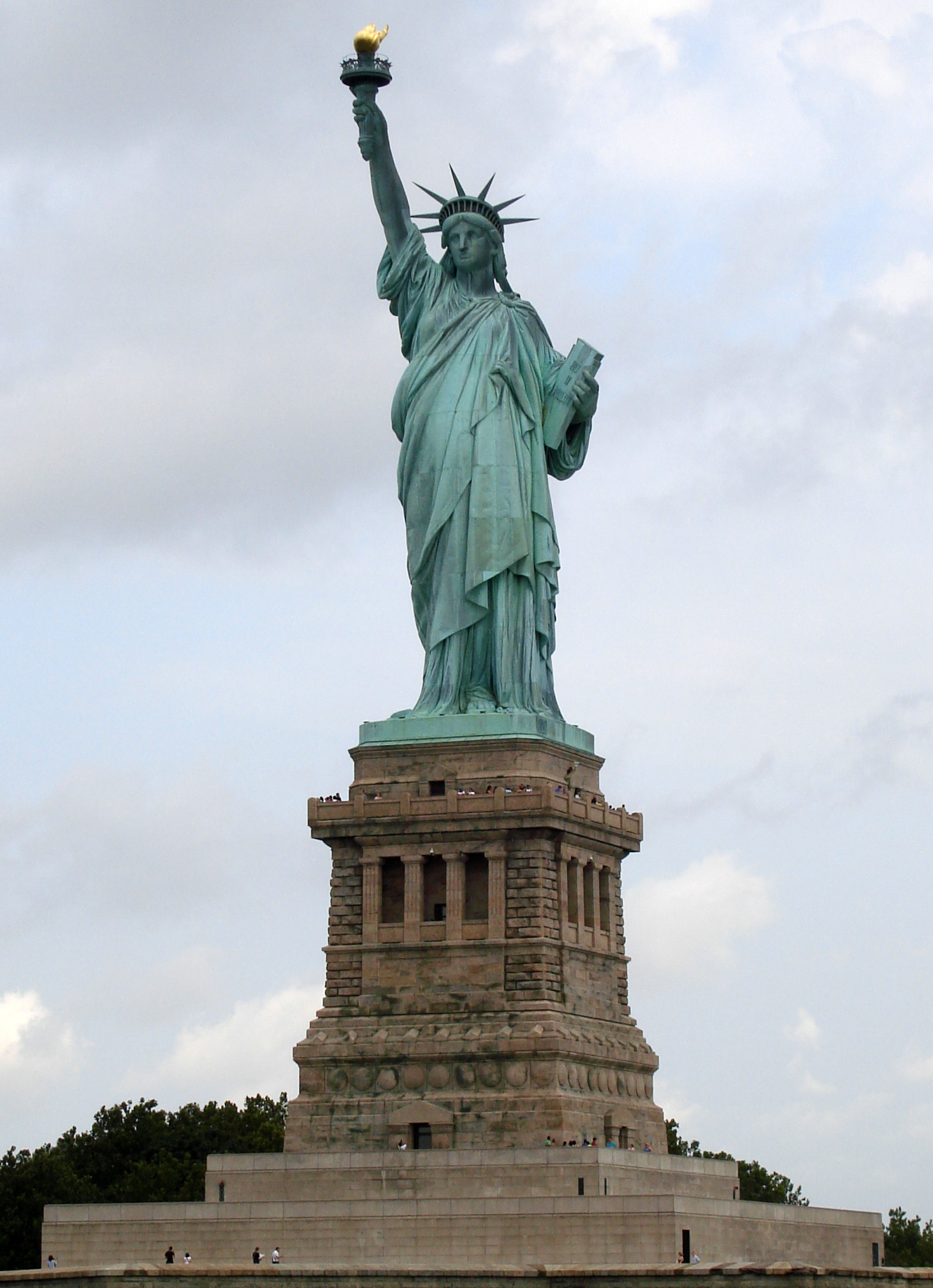
Statue of Liberty in New York City

This poem was written as a donation to an auction of art and literary works conducted by the "Art Loan Fund Exhibition in Aid of the Bartholdi Pedestal Fund for the Statue of Liberty" to raise money for the pedestal's construction. Lazarus's contribution was solicited by fundraiser William Maxwell Evarts. Initially, she refused, but writer Constance Cary Harrison convinced her that the statue would be of great significance to immigrants sailing into the harbor. Lazarus was involved in aiding Jewish refugees to New York who had fled antisemitic pogroms in eastern Europe, and she saw a way to express her empathy for these refugees in terms of the statue.

"The New Colossus" was the first entry read at the exhibit's opening on November 2, 1883. It remained associated with the exhibit through a published catalog until the exhibit closed after the pedestal was fully funded in August 1885, but was forgotten and played no role at the opening of the statue in 1886. It was, however, published in Joseph Pulitzer's New York World as well as The New York Times during this time period. In 1901, Lazarus's friend Georgina Schuyler began an effort to memorialize Lazarus and her poem, which succeeded in 1903 when a plaque bearing the text of the poem was put on the inner wall of the pedestal of the Statue of Liberty.

On the plaque hanging inside the Statue of Liberty, the line "Keep, ancient lands, your storied pomp!" is missing the comma after the word "keep." The plaque also describes itself as an engraving; it is actually a casting.

The original manuscript is held by the American Jewish Historical Society.

== Text ==
Not like the brazen giant of Greek fame,
With conquering limbs astride from land to land;
Here at our sea-washed, sunset gates shall stand
A mighty woman with a torch, whose flame
Is the imprisoned lightning, and her name
Mother of Exiles. From her beacon-hand
Glows world-wide welcome; her mild eyes command
The air-bridged harbor that twin cities frame.

"Keep, ancient lands, your storied pomp!" cries she
With silent lips. "Give me your tired, your poor,
Your huddled masses yearning to breathe free,
The wretched refuse of your teeming shore.
Send these, the homeless, tempest-tost to me,
I lift my lamp beside the golden door!"

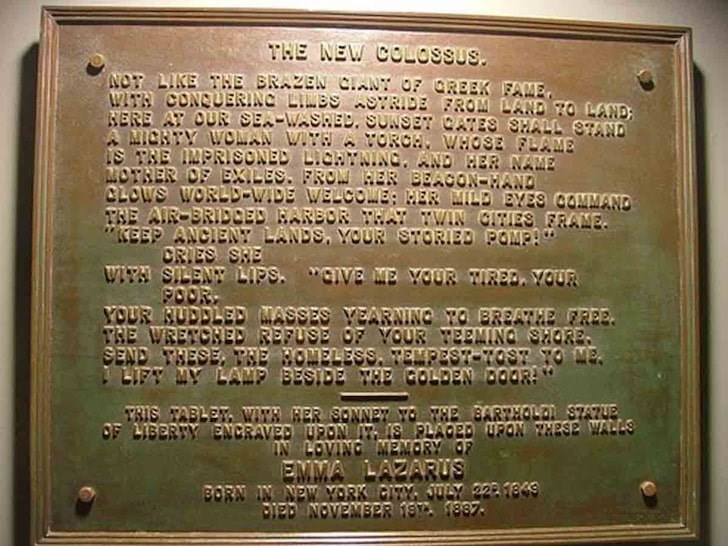
Bronze plaque inside the Statue of Liberty with the text of the poem

== Interpretation ==
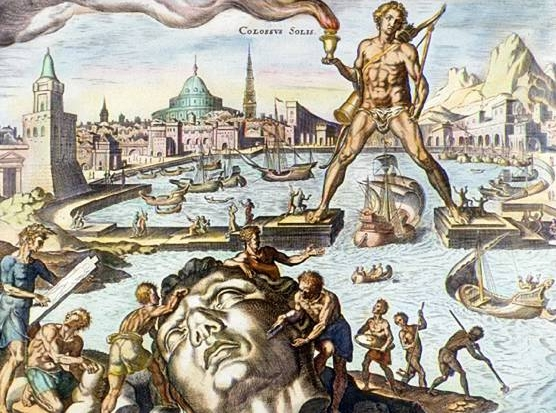
The poem references the Colossus of Rhodes in the lines: "... the brazen giant of Greek fame, With conquering limbs astride from land to land."

The poem is a Petrarchan sonnet.

The title of the poem and the first two lines reference the Greek Colossus of Rhodes, one of the Seven Wonders of the Ancient World, a famously gigantic sculpture that stood beside or straddled the entrance to the harbor of the island of Rhodes in the 3rd century BC. In the poem, Lazarus contrasts that ancient symbol of grandeur and empire ("the brazen giant of Greek fame") with a "New" Colossus – the Statue of Liberty, a female embodiment of commanding "maternal strength" ("Mother of Exiles").

The "sea-washed, sunset gates" are the mouths of the Hudson and East Rivers, to the west of Brooklyn. The "imprisoned lightning" refers to the electric light in the torch, then a novelty.

The "air-bridged harbor that twin cities frame" refers to New York Harbor between New York City and Brooklyn, which were separate cities at the time the poem was written, before being consolidated as boroughs of the City of Greater New York in 1898.

The "huddled masses" refers to the large numbers of immigrants arriving in the United States in the 1880s, particularly through the port of New York. Lazarus was an activist and advocate for Jewish refugees fleeing persecution in Imperial Russia.

== Influence ==
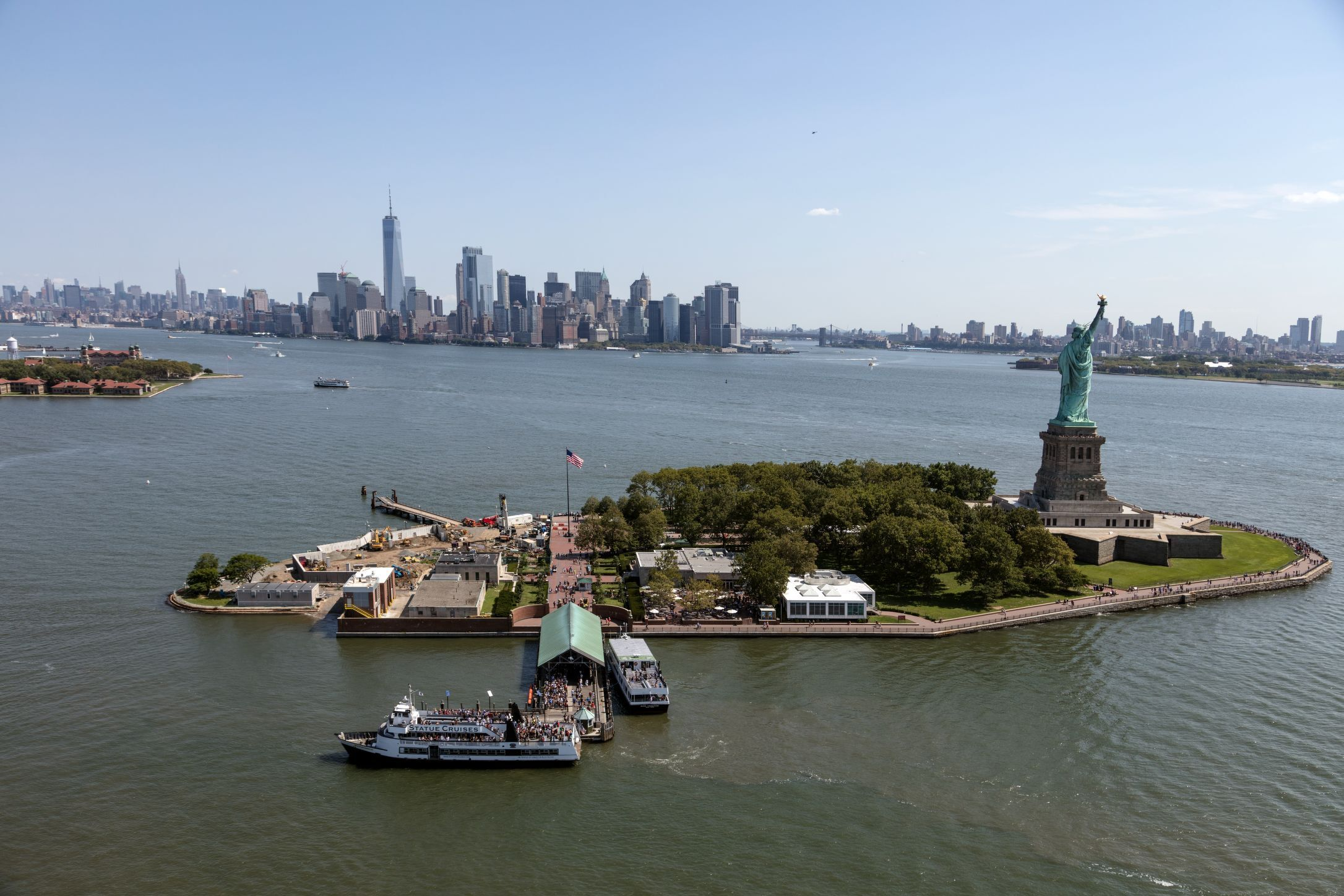
New York Harbor with the Hudson River (far left), the East River (right) and the Statue of Liberty (foreground)

=== Immigration to the United States ===
Paul Auster wrote, "Bartholdi's gigantic effigy was originally intended as a monument to the principles of international republicanism, but 'The New Colossus' reinvented the statue's purpose, turning Liberty into a welcoming mother, a symbol of hope to the outcasts and downtrodden of the world."

John T. Cunningham wrote, "The Statue of Liberty was not conceived and sculpted as a symbol of immigration, but it quickly became so as immigrant ships passed under the torch and the shining face, heading toward Ellis Island. However, it was [Lazarus's poem] that permanently stamped on Miss Liberty the role of unofficial greeter of incoming immigrants."

The poem was quoted in John F. Kennedy's book A Nation of Immigrants (1958).

In 2019, during the first Trump administration, Ken Cuccinelli, whom Trump appointed as acting director of U.S. Citizenship and Immigration Services, revised a line from the poem in support of the administration's "public charge rule", which would have rejected would-be immigrants who lacked adequate income and education to support themselves. Cuccinelli would have rewritten the caveat as, "Give me your tired and your poor who can stand on their own two feet, and who will not become a public charge". He later suggested that the "huddled masses" should be European, and he downplayed the poem as "not actually part of the original Statue of Liberty." Cuccinelli's remark prompted criticism. The Trump administration rule was later blocked by a federal appeals court.

== Cultural reception ==
=== Musical settings ===
The 1949 Irving Berlin musical Miss Liberty includes, as its final song, "Give Me Your Tired, Your Poor", which is a setting of the final part of "The New Colossus".

The song "The Ballad of Sacco and Vanzetti Part 1" by Joan Baez, from the 1971 Italian film Sacco & Vanzetti, uses text from "The New Colossus" for some of its lyrics.

"Give Me Your Tired, Your Poor", a song from the 1986 animated film An American Tail, includes a choral arrangement of "The New Colossus" by James Horner.

=== Other ===
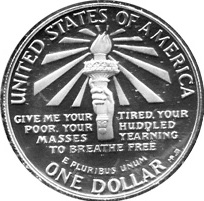
Reverse of the 1986 Statue of Liberty dollar by John Mercanti, featuring an extract from the second stanza of The New Colossus

The 1941 motion picture Hold Back the Dawn paraphrases "The New Colossus" in its dialogue. In Alfred Hitchcock's wartime film Saboteur (1942), a character quotes lines from the sonnet.

The 2014 video game Wolfenstein: The New Order takes place in an alternate reality where the Nazis win The Second World War. The resistance fighter and central character of the game mentally recites "The New Colossus" during the final scene of the game. A subsequent 2017 sequel was thus titled Wolfenstein II: The New Colossus.

In 2020, the American Jewish Historical Society in New York City produced a New Colossus Project of exhibitions, videos, and curriculum related to the poem. It also hosts the Emma Lazarus Translation Project. Translations of the poem into other languages by poets from around the world are collected.
