= Statue of Liberty commemorative coins =

Series of United States commemorative coins

The Statue of Liberty commemorative coins are a series of commemorative coins which were issued by the United States Mint in 1986, the 100th anniversary of the dedication of the Statue of Liberty (formally Liberty Enlightening the World).

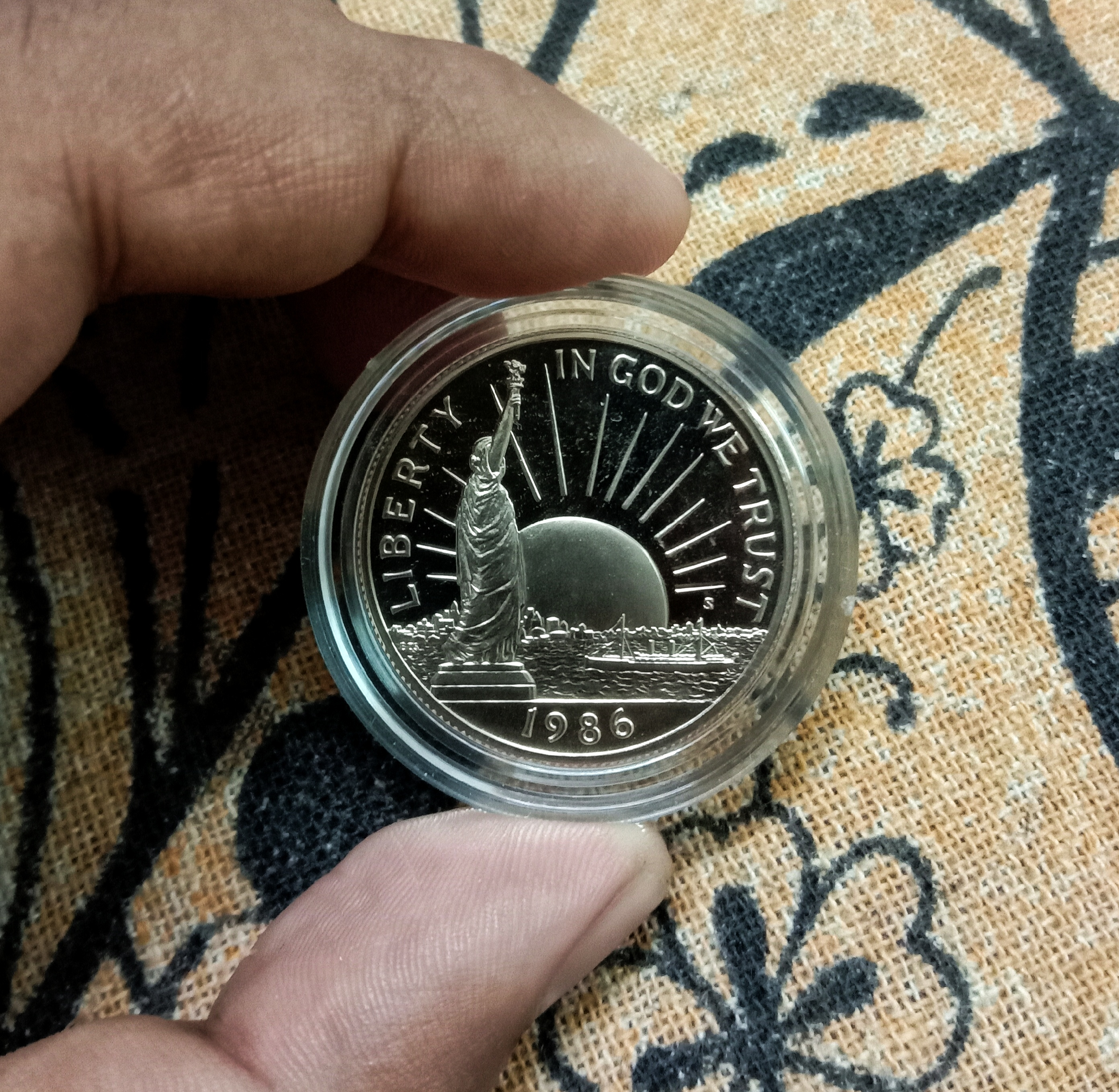
An encapsulated Statue of Liberty commemorative half dollar proof coin

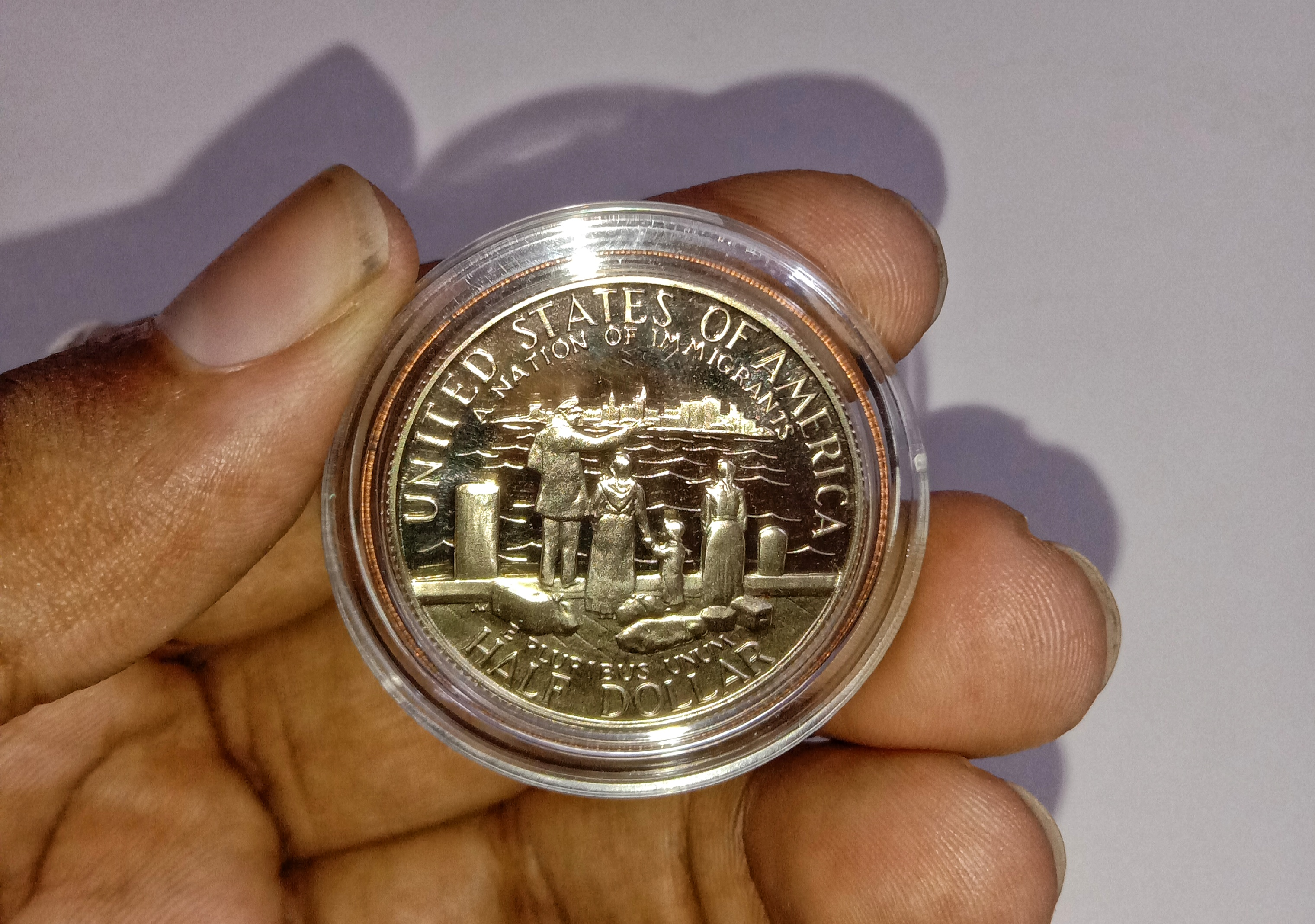

== Legislation ==
The Statue of Liberty-Ellis Island Commemorative Coin Act (Pub. L. 99–61) authorized the production of three coins, a clad half dollar, a silver dollar, and a gold half eagle, to commemorate the centennial of the Statue of Liberty (Liberty Enlightening the World). The act allowed the coins to be struck in both proof and uncirculated finishes.

== Designs ==
=== Half dollar ===
The obverse of the Statue of Liberty half dollar, designed by Edgar Z. Steever, features a view of the Statue of Liberty in 1913 with an immigrant ship in the background. The reverse, designed by Sheryl J. Winter, depicts an immigrant family viewing America from Ellis Island.

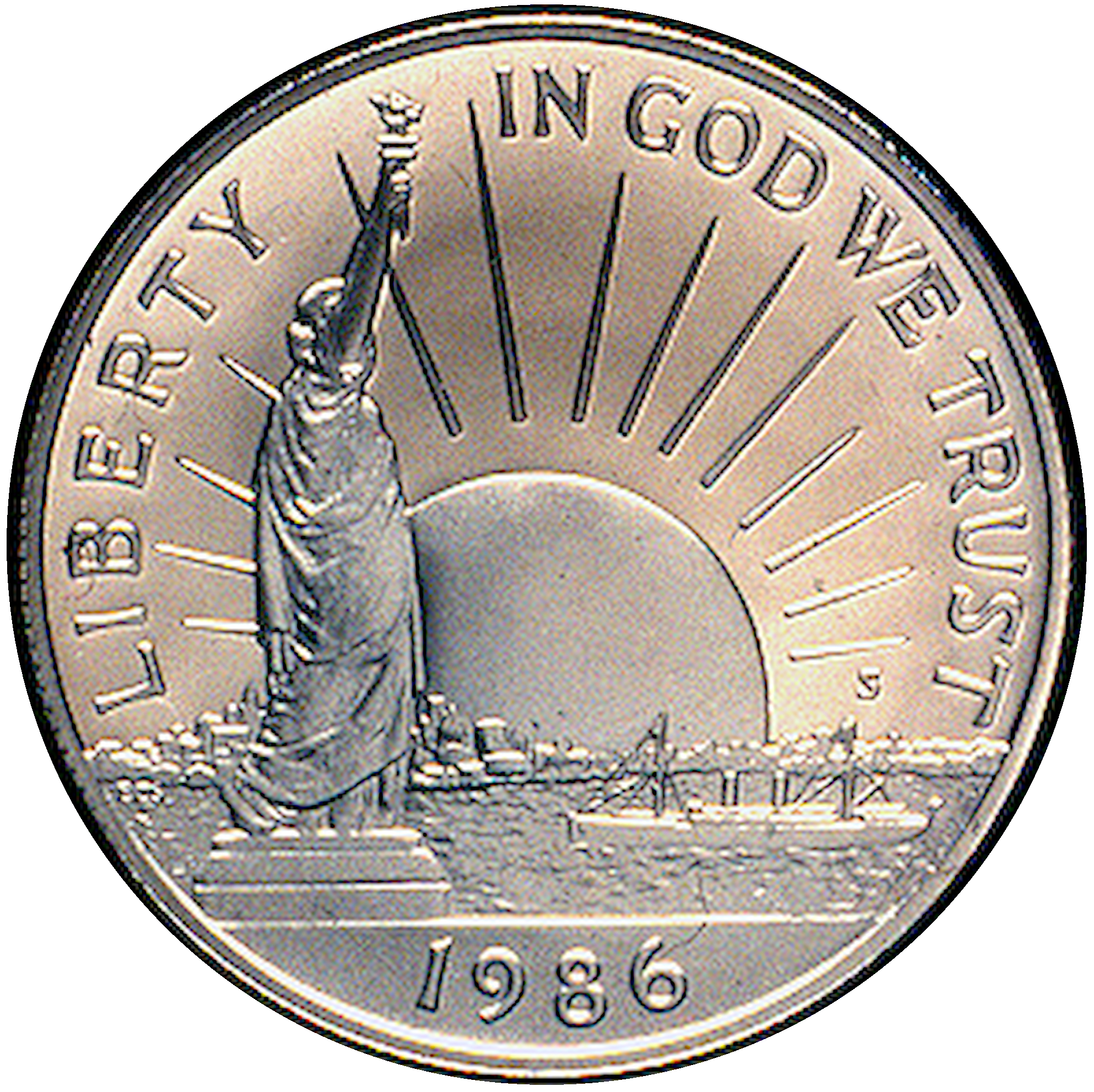
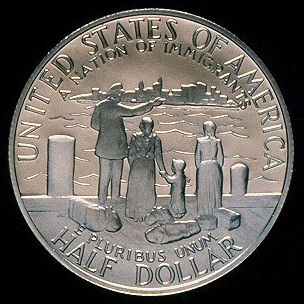
Obverse (left) and reverse (right) of the half dollar

=== Dollar ===
The obverse of the Statue of Liberty dollar, designed by John Mercanti, features the Statue of Liberty in front of the main building of Ellis Island. The reverse, also designed by Mercanti but with assistance from Matthew Peloso, features the statue's torch and a quote from Emma Lazarus' 1883 poem The New Colossus.

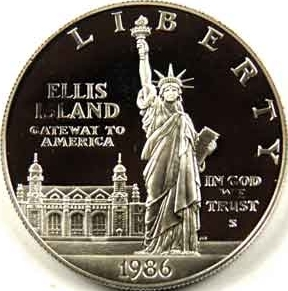
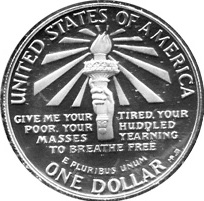
Obverse (left) and reverse (right) of the dollar

=== Half eagle ===
The obverse of the Statue of Liberty half eagle (five dollars) features a close-up view of the Statue of Liberty's face, while the reverse depicts a bald eagle in flight. Both sides were designed by Elizabeth Jones.

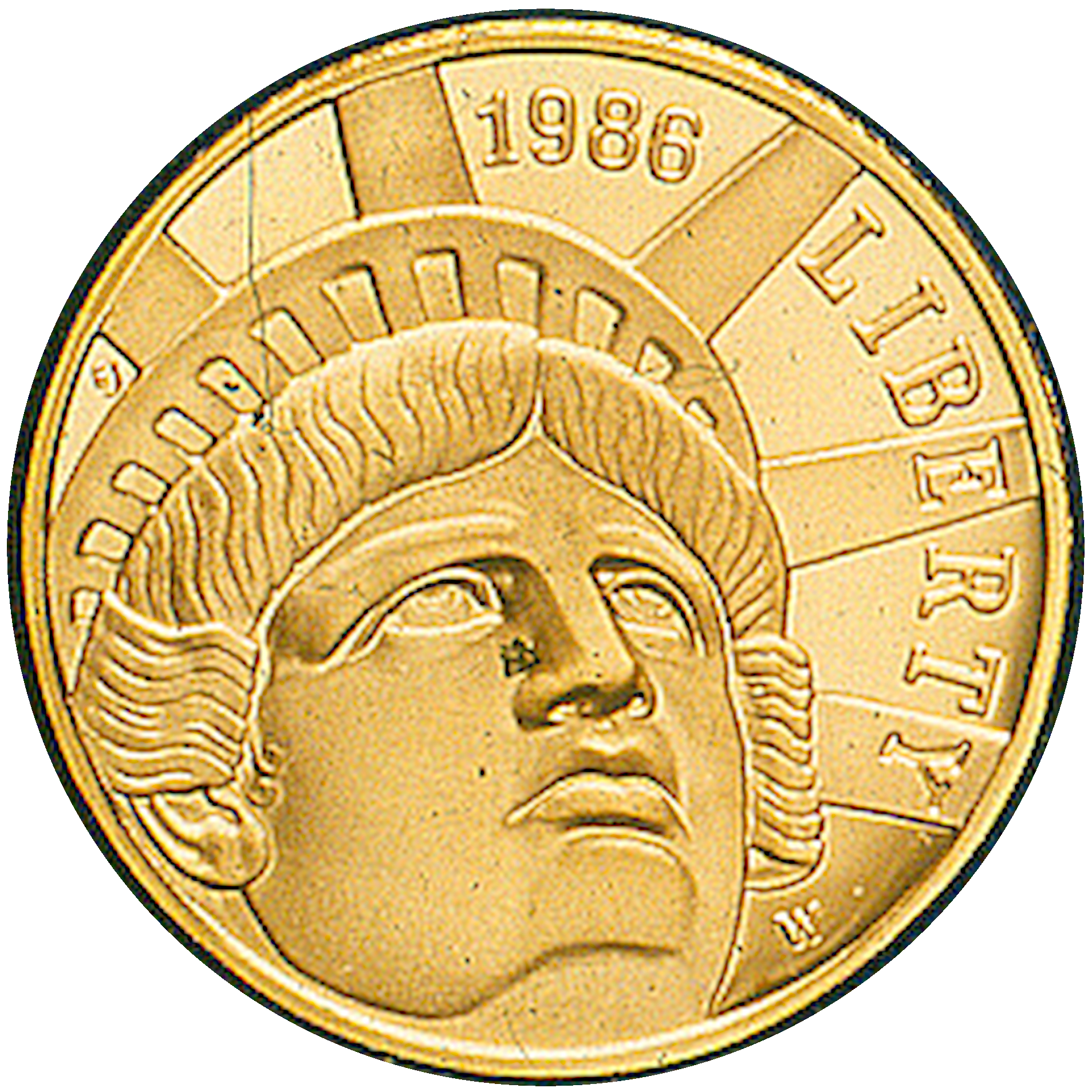
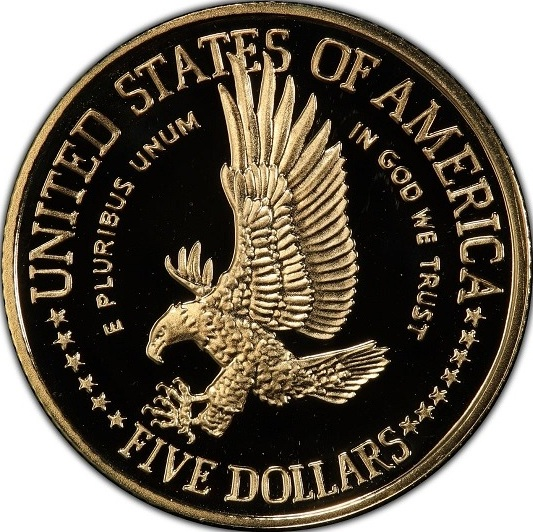
| Obverse (left) and reverse (right) of the half eagle

== See also ==
- United States commemorative coins
- List of United States commemorative coins and medals (1980s)
