= Livia De Stefani =

Italian writer

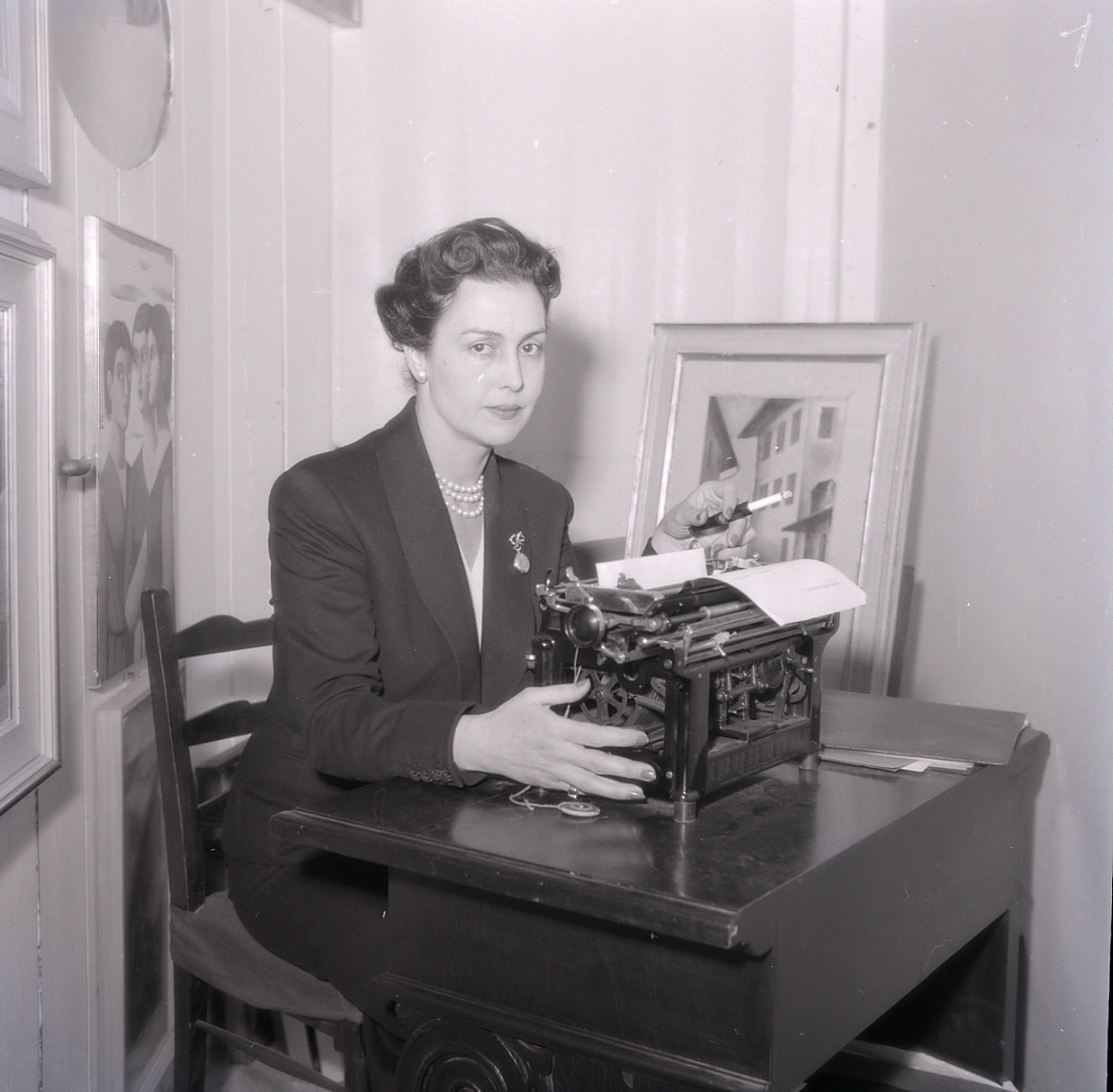
- Livia De Stefani
- Born: 23 June 1913; Palermo
- Died: 28 March 1991 (aged 77); Rome
- Occupation: Writer
- Notable work: The Vineyard of Black Grapes (1953)
- Spouse: Renato Signorini
- Relatives: Jacques Sernas (son-in-law)

Livia De Stefani (23 June 1913 – 28 March 1991) was an Italian writer.

== Early life ==
Livia De Stefani was born into a wealthy landowning family in Palermo, and educated at a convent.

== Career ==
In midlife, De Stefani began writing fiction, and published her novel La vigna di uve nere (1953, published in English as Black Grapes). She went on to write a collection of three short stories, Gli affatturati (1955), another collection of short stories, Viaggio di una sconosciuta (1963, Journey of an Unknown Woman), several more novels, Passione di Rosa (1958, The Passion of Rosa), La signora di Cariddi (1971, The Lady of Cariddi), and La Stella Assenzio (1975, The Star Absinthe), and a memoir, La mafia alle mie (1991, The Mafia Behind Me).

De Stefani's writing is known for its dark psychological themes and its Sicilian cultural context, or sicilianità, including her descriptions of the 1968 Belice earthquake. She is sometimes described as "the first woman to write about the Mafia."

De Stefani won the Premio Venezia in 1952 and the Premio Selento in 1953. De Stefani's novel La vigne di uve nere was adapted for television in 1984. She appeared onscreen in the film Summer Night with Greek Profile, Almond Eyes and Scent of Basil (1986). Her social circles included writers Elsa Morante, Maria Bellonci, and Vitaliano Brancati.

== Personal life ==
In 1930, De Stefani married sculptor Renato Signorini, and moved to Rome. They had three children; their daughter Maria Stella Signorini married actor Jacques Sernas. Renato Signorini died in 1966. De Stefani died in 1991.
