= Chief Engraver of the United States Mint =

Highest staff member at the United States Mint

Chief Engraver of United States Mint
- Incumbent; Joseph Menna since February 2019
- United States Mint
- Formation: 1792
- First holder: Robert Scot

The Chief Engraver of the United States Mint is the highest staff member at the United States Mint.

The Chief Engraver is the person in charge of coin design and engraving of dies at all four United States Mints: Philadelphia, Denver, San Francisco and West Point. The position was created by Congress with the Coinage Act of 1792, and placed within the Department of Treasury that produces circulating coinage for the United States. In 1990 after the resignation of Elizabeth Jones, the post of Chief Engraver was left vacant, and in 1996, with Public Law 104-208, was abolished by Congress.

On February 3, 2009, Mint Director Edmund C. Moy, appointed John Mercanti to the position of Chief Engraver, with duties and prerogatives determined by the Mint’s Office of Public Affairs. The appointment was not a restoration of the original congressionally approved office, but a temporary promotion, renewable annually for one officeholder for no more than five years. Following Mercanti's retirement in 2010, the post remained vacant until February 2019, when Joseph Menna was appointed to the position.

== List of Chief Engravers of the United States Mint ==
Image	Name	Tenure
	Robert Scot	1793 until his death in 1823
	William Kneass	1824 until his death in 1840
	Christian Gobrecht	1840 until his death in 1844
	James B. Longacre	1844 until his death in 1869
	William Barber	1869 until his death in 1879
	Charles E. Barber	1880 until his death in 1917
	George T. Morgan	1917 until his death in 1925
	John R. Sinnock	1925 until his death in 1947
	Gilroy Roberts	1948 to 1964
	Frank Gasparro	1965 to 1981
	Elizabeth Jones	1981 to 1991
	Vacant	1991 to 2006
	John Mercanti	2006 to 2010
	Vacant	2010 to 2019
	Joseph Menna	2019 to present
