= Joseph Menna =

American sculptor and engraver

13th Chief Engraver of the United States Mint
- Incumbent
- Assumed office February 2019
- Preceded by: John Mercanti

Personal details
- Born: Joseph Francis Menna; March 1970 (age 56)
- Children: 3
- Education: University of the Arts; New York Academy of Art; Saint Petersburg Stieglitz State Academy of Art and Design; Art Students League of New York
- Profession: Sculptor, engraver

Joseph Francis Menna (born March 1970) is an American sculptor. He has been the Chief Engraver of the United States Mint since February 2019.

== Biography ==
Menna trained formally at the University of the Arts in Philadelphia, Pennsylvania, New York Academy Graduate School of Figurative Art in New York City, New York and Saint Petersburg Art and Industry Academy in Saint Petersburg, Russia. He also supplemented his training with studies at Arts Students League, and the Sculpture Center in Manhattan, New York City.

Menna was raised in the Blackwood section of Gloucester Township, New Jersey. After graduating from Highland Regional High School he attended the University of the Arts in Philadelphia from which he graduated in 1992. He was awarded a master's degree in 1994 from the New York Academy of Art.

As an art sculptor, Menna's clients include the United States Mint, DC Comics, Fisher-Price and Hasbro, among others.

In 2005, Menna joined the United States Mint as a medallic sculptor.

Menna has also done the digital concept sculpture for the Statue of Unity, situated in Gujarat, India. It is currently the tallest statue in the world.

In February 2019, Menna became the 14th Chief Engraver of the United States Mint. The position had been vacant since 2010.

A resident of Bordentown, New Jersey, Menna and his wife have three children.

== Awards and honors ==
Menna has worked professionally for over two decades as a private artist, United States Mint artist, and collectibles industry artist. His initials "JFM" appear on the obverse of the Trump dollar, and along with artist Lyndall Bass on the Lincoln cent with Union shield reverse, first minted in 2010.

Government offices
Preceded by John Mercanti	Chief Engraver of the U.S. Mint; 2019–present	Succeeded by Incumbent
