= Soraya Esfandiary-Bakhtiary =

Queen of Iran from 1951 to 1958

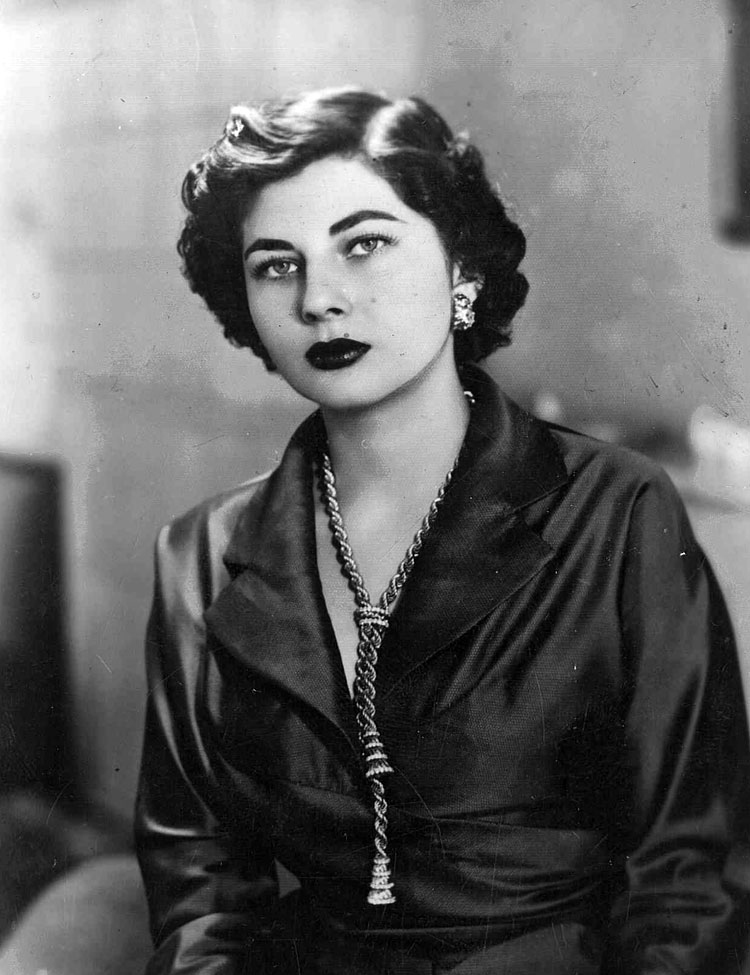
- Soraya in 1953

Queen consort of Iran
- Tenure: 12 February 1951 – 15 March 1958
- Born: 22 June 1932; Isfahan, Pahlavi Iran
- Died: 25 October 2001 (aged 69); Paris, France
- Burial: Westfriedhof, Munich, Germany
- Spouse: Mohammad Reza Pahlavi (m. 1951; div. 1958)
- Father: Khalil Esfandiary-Bakhtiary
- Mother: Eva Karl
- Occupation: Actress (1965)

Soraya Esfandiary-Bakhtiary (Persian: ثریا اسفندیاری بختیاری, romanized: Sorayâ Esfandiâri-Baxtyâri; 22 June 1932 – 25 October 2001) was the second wife of Shah Mohammad Reza Pahlavi and Queen of Iran from 1951 to 1958. Their marriage suffered many pressures, particularly when it became clear that she was infertile. In March 1958, their divorce was announced. After a brief career as an actress, and a liaison with Italian film director Franco Indovina, Soraya lived with her brother in Paris until her death.

== Early life and education ==
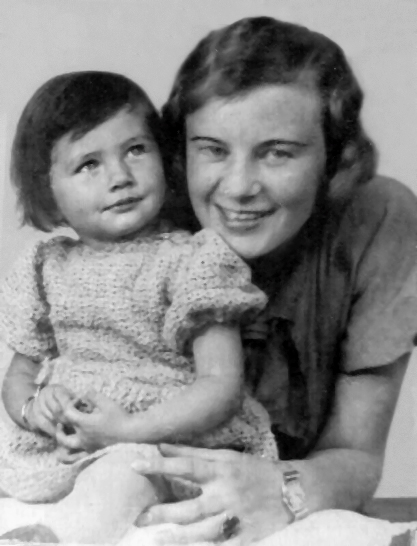
Soraya in childhood with her mother, c. 1935

Soraya was the elder of two children and the only daughter of Khalil Esfandiary-Bakhtiary (1901–1983), a Bakhtiari nobleman and Iranian ambassador to West Germany in the 1950s, and his Russian-born German wife Eva Karl (1906–1994).

She was born in the English Missionary Hospital in Isfahan on 22 June 1932. She had one sibling, a younger brother, Bijan (1937–2001). Her family had long been involved in the Iranian government and diplomatic corps. An uncle of her father, Sardar Assad, was a leader in the Persian Constitutional Revolution of the early 20th century. Soraya was raised in Berlin and Isfahan, and educated in London and Switzerland.

== Marriage ==
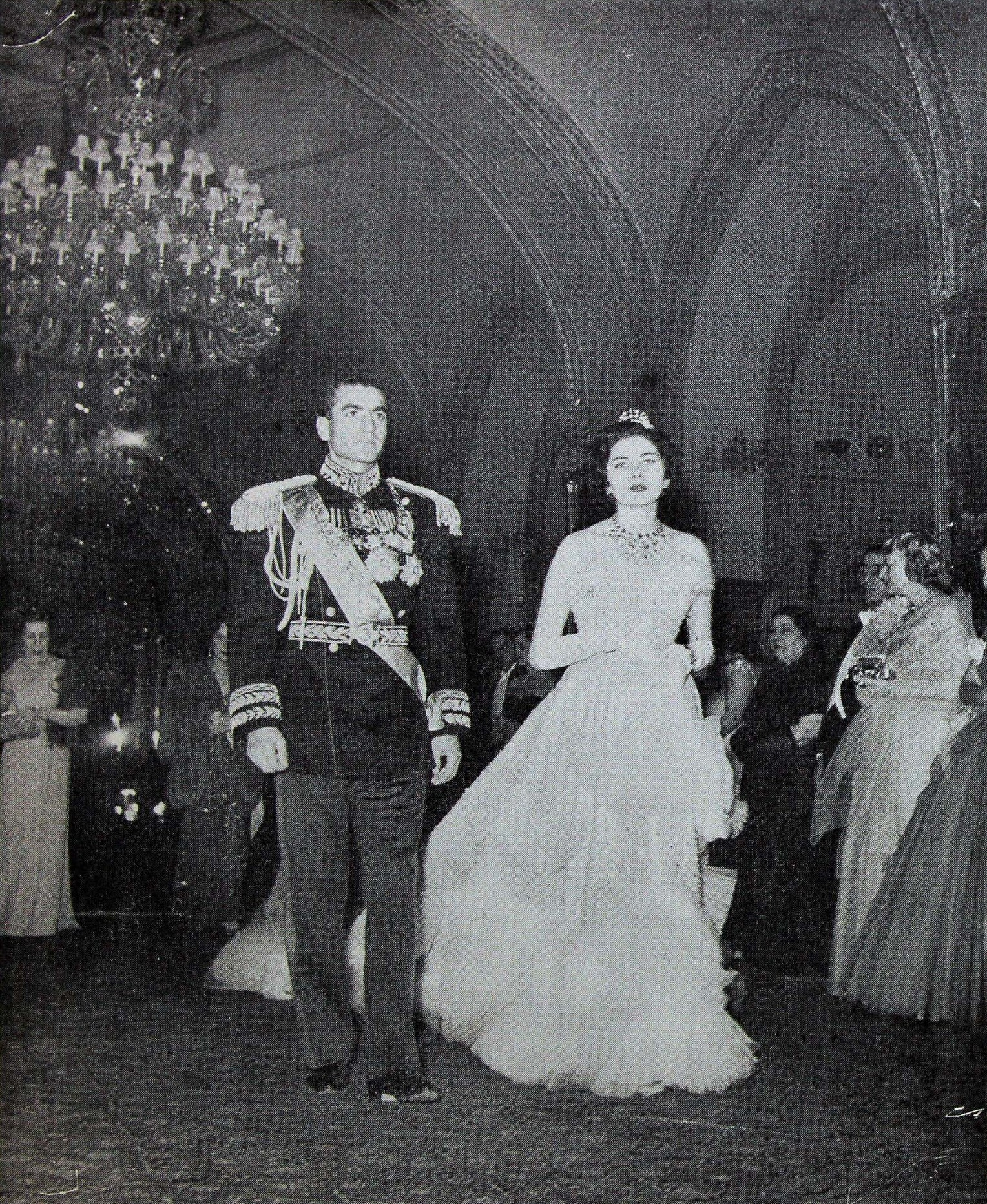
Wedding in 1951

In 1948, Soraya was introduced to the recently divorced Shah Mohammad Reza Pahlavi, by Forough Zafar Bakhtiari, a close relative of Soraya's, via a photograph taken by Goodarz Bakhtiary, in London, per Forough Zafar's request. At the time Soraya had completed high school at a Swiss finishing school and was studying the English language in London. They were soon engaged: the Shah gave her a 22.37 carat (4.474 g) diamond engagement ring.

Soraya married the Shah at Marble Palace, Tehran, on 12 February 1951. Originally the couple had planned to wed on 27 December 1950, but the ceremony was postponed due to the bride being ill.

Although the Shah announced that guests should donate money to a special charity for the Iranian poor, among the wedding gifts were a mink coat and a desk set with black diamonds sent by Joseph Stalin; a Steuben glass Bowl of Legends designed by Sidney Waugh and sent by President of the United States, Harry S. Truman and Mrs. Truman; and silver Georgian candlesticks from King George VI and Queen Elizabeth. The 2,000 guests included Aga Khan III.

The ceremony was decorated with 1.5 tonnes of orchids, tulips and carnations, sent by plane from the Netherlands. Entertainment included an equestrian circus from Rome. The bride wore a silver lamé gown studded with pearls and trimmed with marabou stork feathers, designed for the occasion by Christian Dior. Of all the Shah's many women, it is generally believed that Soraya was the "true love" of his life as she was the one he loved the most.

Soraya later wrote about herself and Iran: "I was a dunce. I knew next to nothing of the geography, the legends of my country; nothing of its history, nothing of the Muslim religion". Soraya's upbringing had been entirely German and Catholic, which left her with a mixed identity, and made her the object of much distrust in Iran with Muslim clerics saying the Shah should not marry this "half-European girl" who was not raised a Muslim. Soraya wrote: "The feeling of being both Christian and Muslim, but at the same time of being neither one nor the other has engraved in my flesh two divergent poles between which my existence has unfolded. The one is methodically European, the other savagely Persian".

== Queen of Iran ==
Following the marriage, Soraya headed the family charity in Iran.

During the confrontation with Prime Minister Mohammad Mosaddegh of the left-wing National Front, Mohammad Reza was often depressed, being in her words "somber and distressed" to the extent he even stopped playing poker with his friends, which had been one of his main passions.

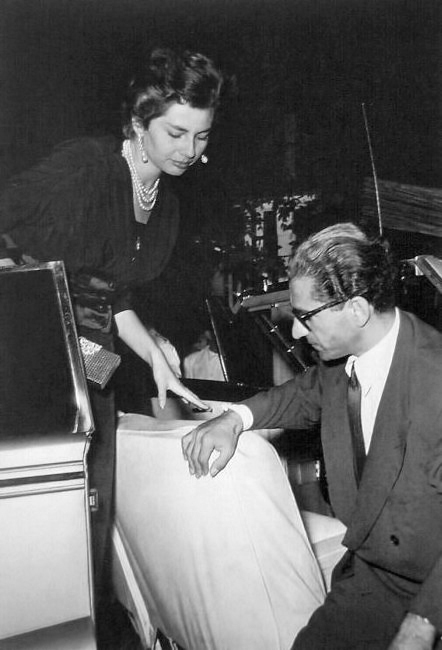
Soraya and the Shah in 1953

In August 1953, Soraya followed the Shah when he fled to Rome, and complained the Iranian ambassador to Italy failed to arrange for a place for them to stay while the royal couple were constantly harassed by the paparazzi. On 19 August 1953, Soraya remembered how a glum Mohammad Reza was talking about moving to the United States when he received a telegram announcing that Mosaddegh had been overthrown, leading him to shout with joy.

After the 1953 coup overthrew Mosaddegh, the Shah's spirits picked up. One of Mohammad Reza and Soraya's favorite activities was masked balls, although Soraya complained the Shah always wore a lion costume (the symbol of royalty) while her attempts to appear as Madame de Pompadour were vetoed under grounds this was inappropriate for a queen, and she was forced to appear as Joan of Arc instead. Soraya always praised her husband when he displayed "European" personality traits while criticizing him for "Oriental" behavior.

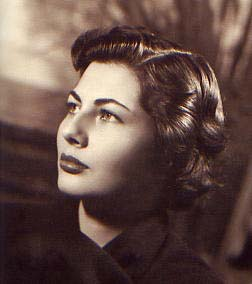
Court portrait in 1953

Soraya described her time in Paris as "every day my heart was filled with sunshine. Life was light... it was wonderful to be able to go to the cinemas, to drink a glass of lemonade on the terrace of the brassie... a pleasure forbade." Soraya wrote about her joy at attending school in Europe, unlike the Iranian schools with "the grey uniform, the stove which smoked and polluted the classroom, lessons, homework, work to the point of exhaustion".

In October 1954, Mohammad Reza told Soraya he was concerned about the fact that she had not given him an heir and suggested that they visit the United States to seek the help of American fertility doctors. In 1954-55, the Imperial couple paid a lengthy visit to the United States, leaving on 5 December 1954. In New York, Soraya visited doctors who assured her that an inability to bear a child was due to the "shocks, upsets and vexations of the last two years", which reassured her, but in Boston, the doctors told her she was infertile and could never have children. Much of the length of their trip was due to the Shah's efforts to do something to console Soraya who took the news that she was infertile very badly. Unaware of what the doctors had revealed to Soraya, Newsweek sarcastically wrote "even the Shahanshah (King of Kings), Vice Regent of God, Shadow of the Almighty and Center of the Universe deserves a vacation....They [the imperial couple] have spent this winter in a private visit to the U.S...physical check-ups in New York hospitals, sight-seeing in San Francisco, dancing the mambo in Hollywood, skiing in Sun Valley, water-skiing in Miami Beach".

Soraya was fascinated with Hollywood and enjoyed meeting American film stars during her stay in Los Angeles. During her time in Los Angeles, Soraya met her favorite stars who were Grace Kelly, Lauren Bacall, Bob Hope, Esther Williams, and Humphrey Bogart. A photograph of Queen Soraya water-skiing in Miami while wearing a bikini became extremely controversial in Iran. Soraya was widely condemned for the immorality of wearing her swimsuit, which was not considered a proper dress for a Muslim, and the photo was banned in Iran in an attempt to silence the criticism of the ulama.

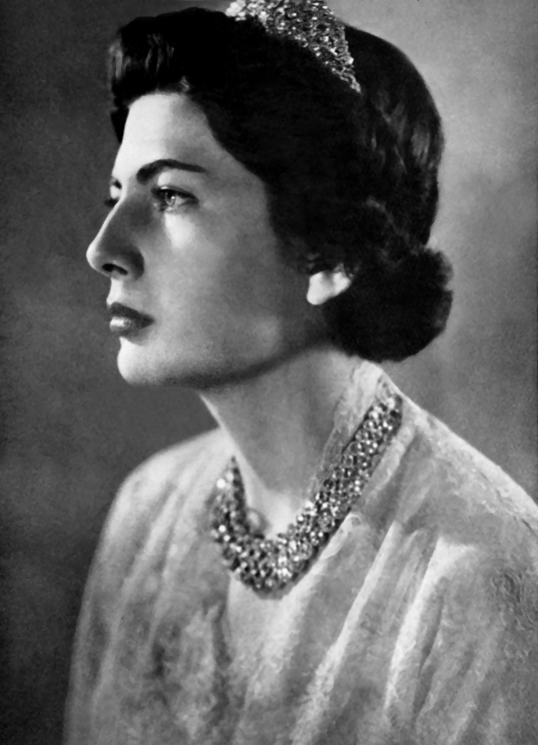
Queen Soraya in 1956

On 12 February 1955, the imperial couple left the United States for the United Kingdom on the famous liner, the Queen Mary. In London, Mohammad Reza and Soraya had dinner at Buckingham Palace with Queen Elizabeth II; Prince Philip, Duke of Edinburgh; the Prime Minister Sir Winston Churchill and the Foreign Secretary Sir Anthony Eden. In the final part of their trip, the imperial couple visited Cologne where they stayed with Soraya's parents. The Shah's daughter by his first marriage, Princess Shahnaz, who was studying in Belgium, also went to Cologne to see her father, which caused a jealous Soraya to throw what was called an "embarrassing tantrum", demanding that her husband show love only to her, which finally led to the Shah to tell her to shut up. On 12 March 1955, the Shah and the Queen returned to Tehran, where they were pleased that, despite the fact it was raining, thousands of people had come out to welcome them back. The Shah, who disliked his prime minister, General Fazlollah Zahedi, was well pleased that Zahedi who was suffering from gout was visibly uncomfortable standing out in the rain to welcome him back at the Tehran airport.

Later in 1955, the Shah resumed the persecution of the Baháʼí Faith minority, razing their temples. The British diplomat Denis Wright protested to the Shah's minister Asadollah Alam, only to be told that Mohammad Reza had to do something to appease the ulama after the photograph of Soraya in a bikini appeared, which had enraged Ayatollah Seyyed Hossein Borujerdi, a key ally of the Shah.

== Divorce ==
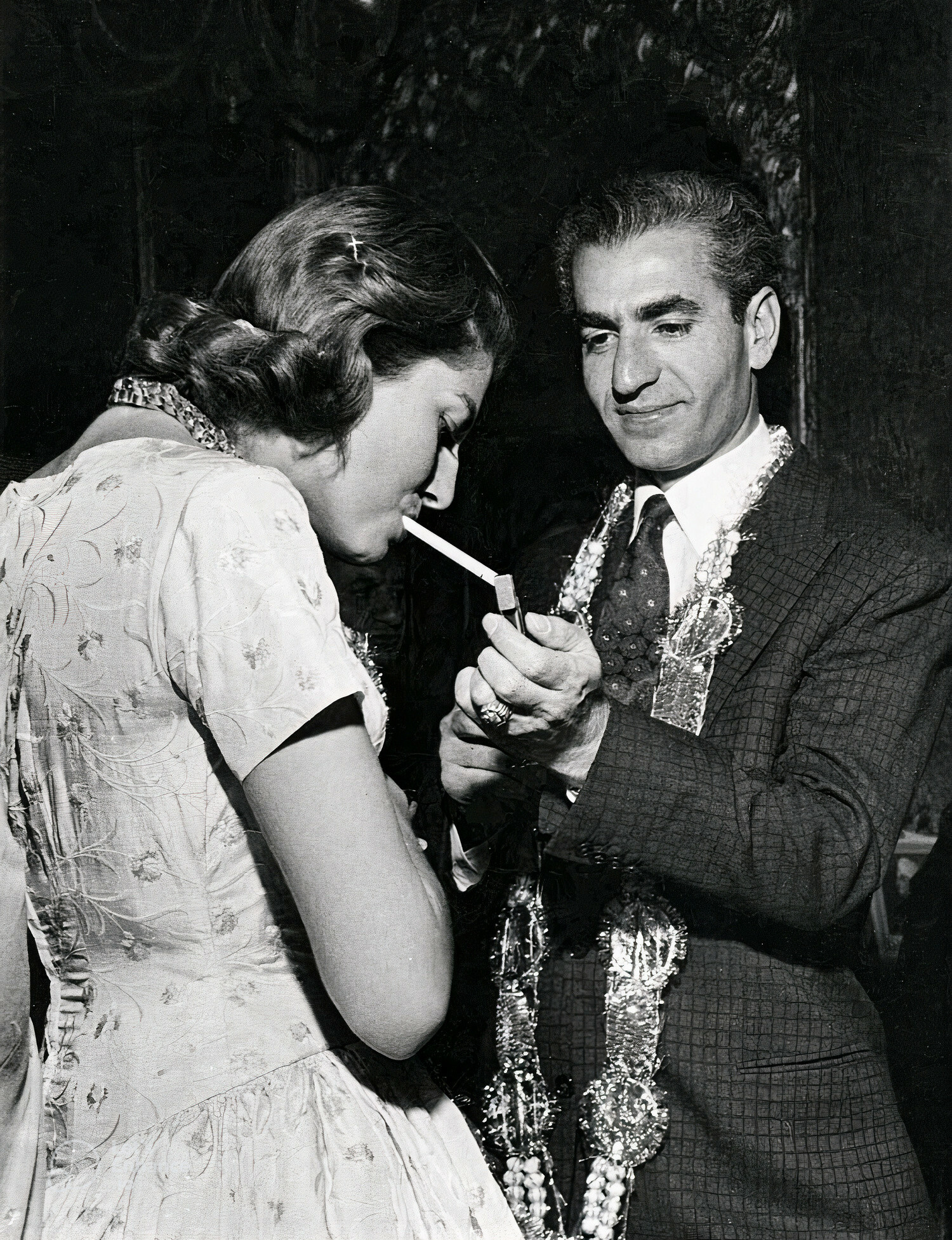
The Shah lighting a cigarette for his wife Soraya

Though the wedding took place during heavy snow, deemed a good omen, the imperial couple's marriage had disintegrated by early 1958 owing to Soraya's apparent infertility. The Shah's only child, his daughter Princess Shahnaz, had married Ardeshir Zahedi, the son of the former Prime Minister, General Fazlollah Zahedi, whom Mohammad Reza despised and had dismissed in 1955. The Shah told Soraya that "a Zahedi could not continue the dynasty of the Pahlavis", and that she had to give him a son so the House of Pahlavi could continue. She had sought treatment in Switzerland and France, and in St. Louis with William Masters.

The Shah's domineering mother hated Soraya and was pressuring him to divorce her, telling him it was his duty to father a son to continue the House of Pahlavi. Mohammad Reza persuaded Soraya to leave Iran while he promised he would call the "Council of Wise Men" to change the constitution. Despite this promise, Soraya sensed her husband had turned against her, and before she left Iran one courtier remembered she had "systematically put her house in order".

She left Iran in February and eventually went to her parents' home in Cologne, Germany, where the Shah sent his wife's uncle, Sardar Assad in early March 1958, in a failed attempt to convince her to return to Iran. Soraya rejected the offer that she remain queen while the Shah would take a second wife, writing in her memoirs that Mohammad Reza was "fundamentally an Oriental", drawing an unfavorable contrast with the Duke of Windsor "who sacrificed his throne for love", writing that only "Orientals" sacrificed love for their thrones. On 5 March, Mohammad Reza phoned her to tell her she would have to accept him taking a second wife or else he would divorce her. On 10 March, a council of advisers met with the Shah to discuss the situation of the troubled marriage and the lack of an heir. Four days later, it was announced that the imperial couple would divorce.

In a press statement issued by the Iranian government, it was announced that Soraya had agreed to the divorce while Soraya later claimed she had last heard from her husband on 5 March and she had not been informed beforehand. It was, the 25-year-old queen said, "a sacrifice of my own happiness". She later told reporters that her husband had no choice but to divorce her. The British Ambassador to Iran reported "Soraya was the Shah's only true love" and he was "a man at an emotional cross-roads", who was happy to be able to marry again while unable to "bring himself to face it" that he had just divorced Soraya.

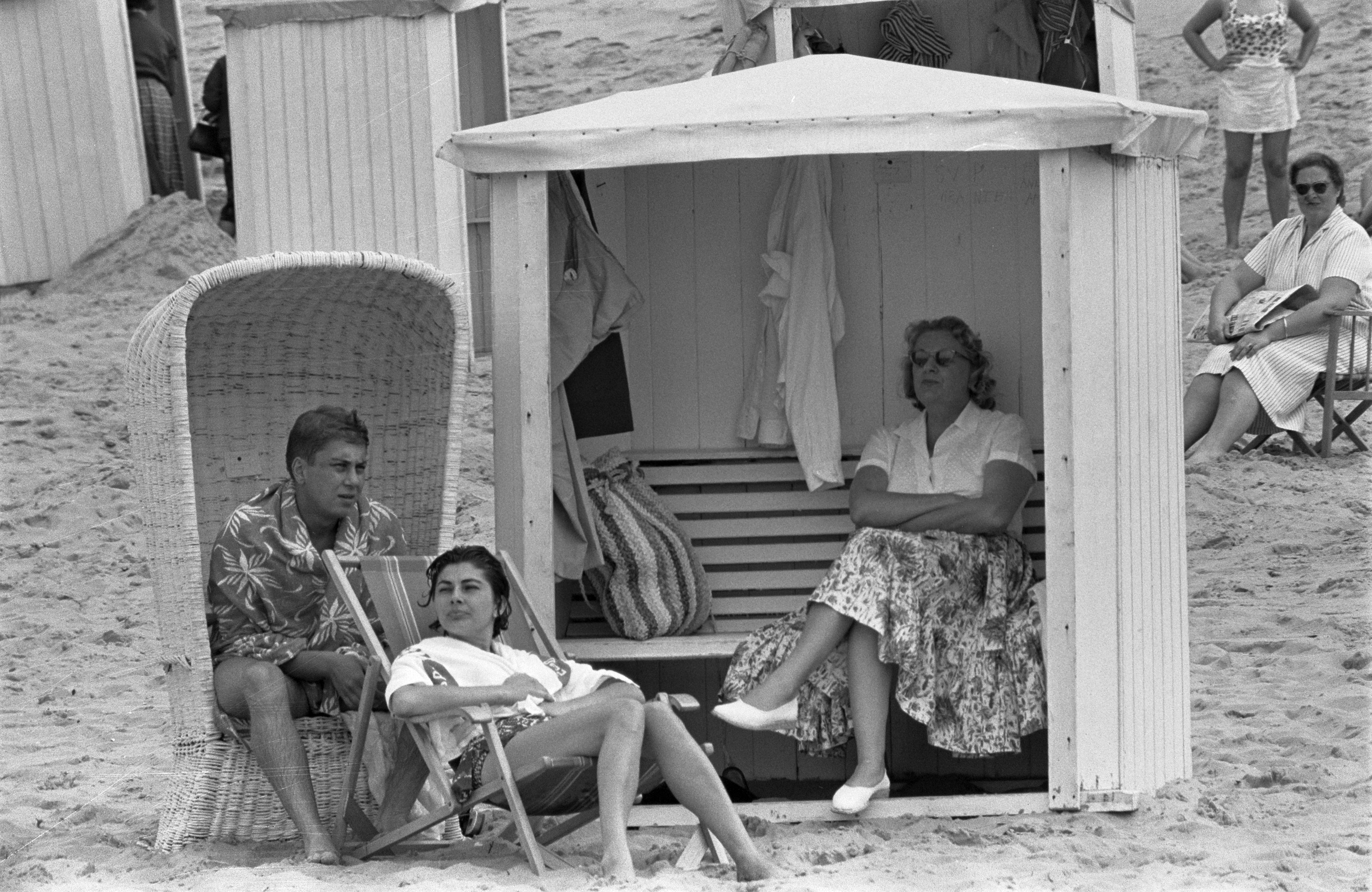
Soraya at Noordwijk beach after her divorce, August 1959

On 21 March 1958, the Nowruz, a weeping Shah announced his divorce to the Iranian people in a speech that was broadcast on radio and television; he said that he would not remarry in haste. The marriage officially ended on 6 April 1958. According to a report in The New York Times, extensive negotiations had preceded the divorce in order to convince Queen Soraya to allow her husband to take a second wife. The Queen, however, citing what she called the sanctity of marriage, decided that "she could not accept the idea of sharing her husband's love with another woman."

In a statement issued to the Iranian people from her parents' home in Germany, Soraya said, "Since His Imperial Majesty Mohammad Reza Shah Pahlavi has deemed it necessary that a successor to the throne must be of direct descent in the male line from generation to generation to generation, I will with my deepest regret in the interest of the future of the State and of the welfare of the people in accordance with the desire of His Majesty the Emperor sacrifice my own happiness, and I will declare my consent to a separation from His Imperial Majesty." Soraya was well rewarded for the divorce with the Shah buying her a penthouse apartment in Paris that was valued at US$3 million, paying her a monthly alimony of US$7,000 (that continued to be paid until the Islamic Revolution overthrew Mohammad Reza in 1979), together with various luxuries such as a 1958 Rolls-Royce Phantom IV, a Mercedes-Benz 300 SL, a Bulgari ruby, a Van Cleef & Arpels brooch and a Harry Winston platinum ring with a 22.37-carat diamond that after her death was sold at the estate auction for US$838,350.

After the divorce, the Shah, who had told a reporter who asked about his feelings for the former Queen that "nobody can carry a torch longer than me", indicated his interest in marrying Princess Maria Gabriella of Savoy, a daughter of the deposed Italian king Umberto II. In an editorial about the rumors surrounding the marriage of "a Muslim sovereign and a Catholic princess", the Vatican newspaper, L'Osservatore Romano, considered the match "a grave danger".

== Career as actress ==
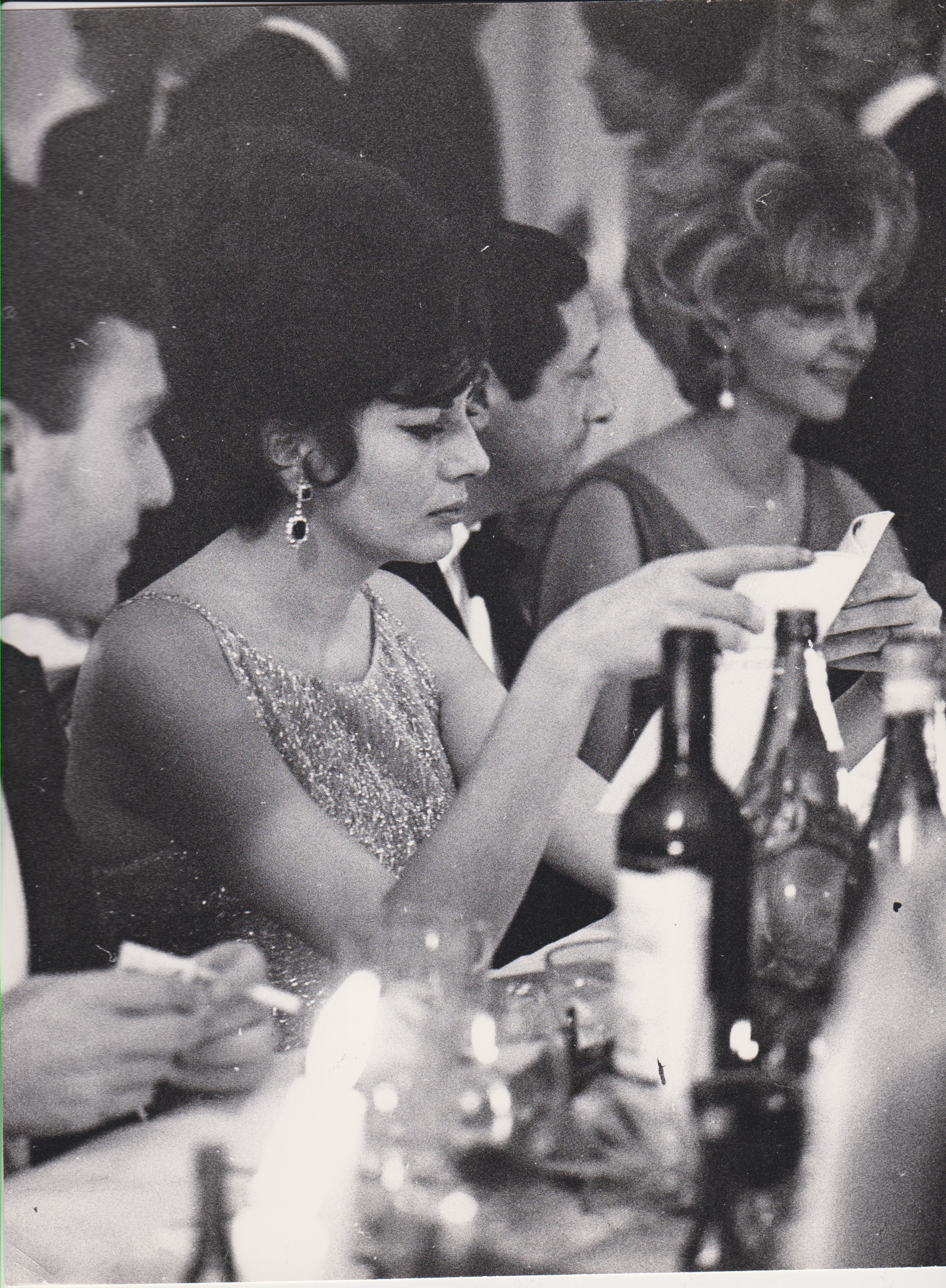
Soraya in 1962

After her divorce, Soraya was in a relationship with the Swiss actor Maximilian Schell and one with the German and Swiss industrial heir Gunter Sachs and also lived briefly in Munich. Later Soraya moved to France. She launched a brief career as a film actress, for which she used only her first name. Initially, it was announced that she would portray Catherine the Great in a movie about the Russian empress by Dino De Laurentiis, but that project fell through. Instead, she starred in the 1965 movie I tre volti (The Three Faces) and became the companion of its Italian director, Franco Indovina (1932–1972). She appeared as a character named Soraya in the 1965 movie She. After Indovina's death in a plane crash and the suicide of two other close friends, Swiss banker Edmond Artar and Vicomte Audoin de Barbot, she spent the remainder of her life in Europe, succumbing to depression, which she outlined in her 1991 memoir, Le Palais des solitudes (The Palace of Loneliness).

== Later years in Paris ==
In 1979, Soraya wrote to Mohammad Reza as he was dying of cancer in Panama, saying she still loved him and wanted to see him one last time. Mohammad Reza was greatly moved by her letters, and wrote back to her saying he also still loved her and wanted to see her one last time as well, but said his third wife Empress Farah could not be present, which presented problems as she was constantly by the former Shah's bedside as he lay dying. In 1980, it was agreed that Soraya would visit Mohammad Reza in Cairo, but he died before she could make the trip, which led Milani to comment that Mohammad Reza and Soraya were true "star-crossed lovers". Soraya did not communicate with Farah, even when both lived in Paris.

== Death ==
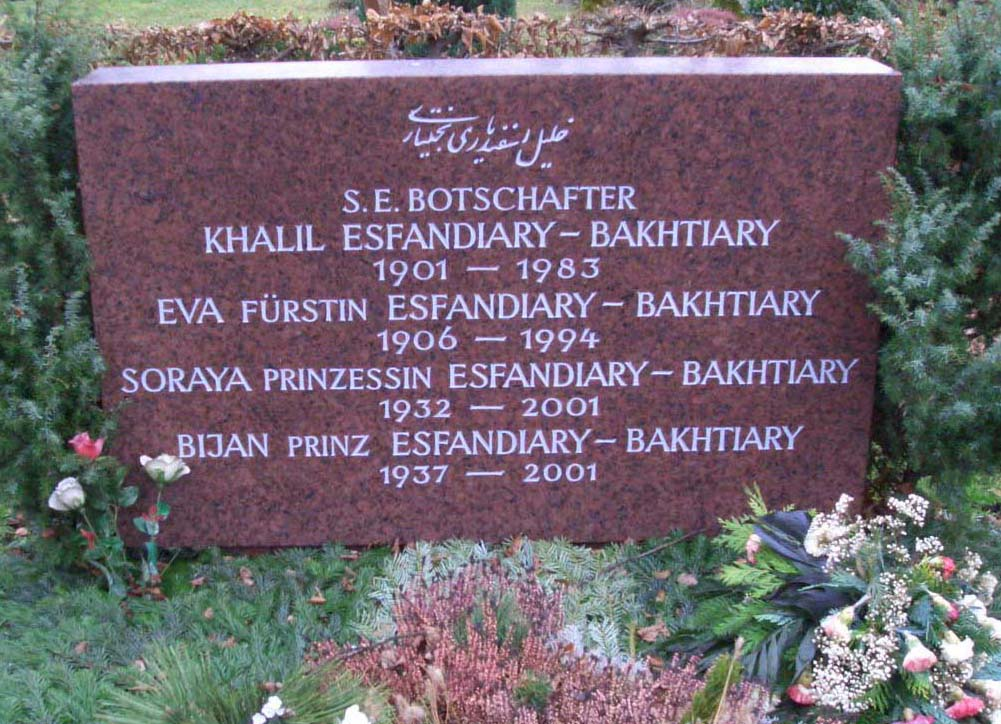
Grave of Soraya Esfandiary-Bakhtiary in Munich, 5th Grave in Quarter Nr. 143 in front of the Quarter Nr. 149

Soraya died on 25 October 2001 of undisclosed causes in her apartment in Paris, France; she was 69. Upon learning of her death, her younger brother, Bijan, sadly commented, "After her, I don't have anyone to talk to." Bijan died one week later.

After her funeral at the American Cathedral in Paris on 6 November 2001 which was attended by Princess Ashraf Pahlavi, Prince Gholam Reza Pahlavi, the Count and Countess of Paris, the Prince and Princess of Naples, Prince Michel of Orléans, and Princess Ira von Fürstenberg she was buried in the Westfriedhof Quarter Nr. 143, in a cemetery in Munich, along with her parents and brother.

Since her death, several women have come forward claiming to be her illegitimate daughter, reportedly born in 1962. According to the Persian-language weekly Nimrooz none of the claims have been confirmed. The newspaper also published an article in 2001 which suggested, without proof, that Princess Soraya and her brother had been murdered.

Her belongings were sold at auction in Paris in 2002, for more than $8.3 million. A legal dispute over her estate, valued at 4.5 million euros, continued until 2016. The Higher Regional Court of Cologne ultimately awarded the movable portion of the estate—including jewelry and the furnishings of Soraya’s Paris apartment—to three French nonprofit organizations that Soraya had named as heirs in her will in the event that her brother, Bijan Esfandiary Bakhtiary, died without legitimate children. The remainder of the estate went to the sole heir of Soraya’s brother, who had died just a few days after Soraya. A few hours before his death, he had named his chauffeur and private secretary, Hassan F., as his heir in a brief note. This was recognized by the Higher Regional Court of Cologne in 2016.

== Memoirs ==
Princess Soraya wrote two memoirs. The first, published in 1964 and published in the United States by Doubleday, was Princess Soraya: Autobiography of Her Imperial Highness. A decade before her death, she and a collaborator, Louis Valentin, wrote another memoir in French, Le Palais des solitudes (Paris: France Loisirs/Michel Laffon, 1991), which was translated into English as Palace of Solitude (London: Quartet Books Ltd, 1992); ISBN 0-7043-7020-4.

== Legacy ==
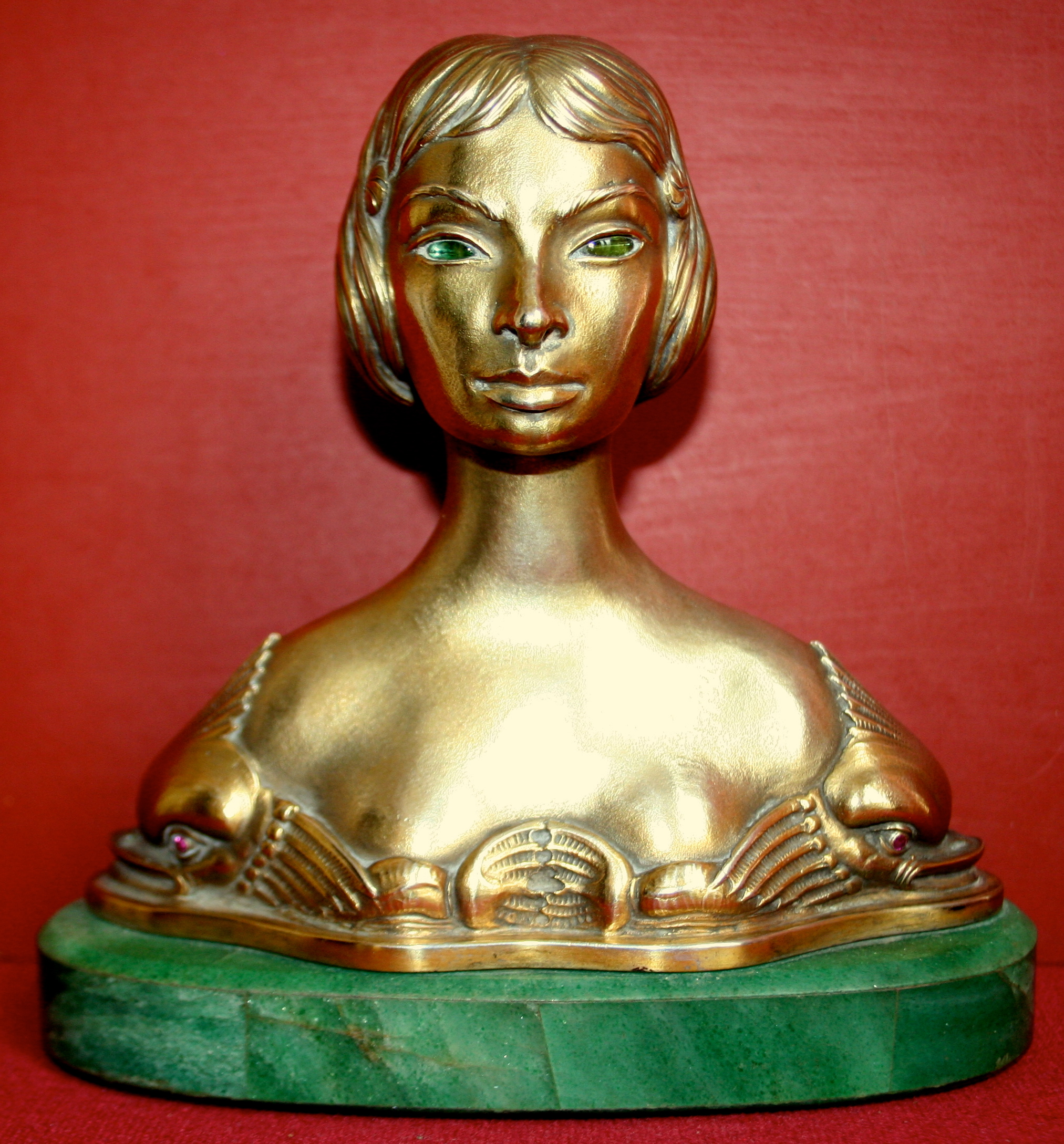
Bust of Soraya, by Renato Signorini

Sculptor Renato Signorini created a bust of Soraya in the 1950s.

A French rose grower bred a sunflower in the former queen's honor, which he called "Empress Soraya".

=== In popular culture ===
Soraya's divorce from the Shah inspired Belgian writer Françoise Mallet-Joris to write a poem which was adapted into a hit pop song, "Je veux pleurer comme Soraya" ("I Want to Cry Like Soraya"), sung by Marie-Paule Belle, released in 1995.

An Italian/German television movie about the princess's life, Soraya (a.k.a. Sad Princess), was broadcast in 2003, starring Anna Valle as Soraya and Erol Sander as the Shah. French actress Mathilda May appeared as the Shah's sister, Princess Shams Pahlavi.

The novel Raya, by Mahsa Rahmani Noble, is a work of historical fiction based on the life of Princess Soraya, published by Archway on 31 July 2018.

In 2021 it was announced that a film adaptation was set to begin. Production is by global entertainment company Sister, co-founded by U.K. TV veteran Jane Featherstone together with Elisabeth Murdoch and Stacey Snider, and Iranian-Australian filmmaker Noora Niasari is directing the film. Sister is funding the production, with Kate Fenske producing for Sister. US producers Krasnoff/Foster Entertainment have come on board as co-producers, with Gary Foster and Russ Krasnoff producing for that company. Principal photography was scheduled to take place in 2022.

== Filmography ==
Film and television
| Year | Title | Role | Notes |
|---|---|---|---|
| 1953 | Zwischen Glück und Krone | Herself | Archive footage |
| 1965 | The Three Faces | Herself/Linda /Mrs. Melville | |
| 1965 | She | Soraya | |
| 1998 | Legenden | Herself | Episode: "Soraya" |

== See also ==
- List of Iranian women royalty

Soraya Esfandiary-Bakhtiary House of Pahlavi Born: 22 June 1932 Died: 26 October 2001
Iranian royalty
| Vacant Title last held by Fawzia of Egypt | Queen consort of Iran; 1951–1958 | Vacant Title next held by Farah Diba |
