= John Mercanti =

American sculptor and engraver (born 1943)

John M. Mercanti
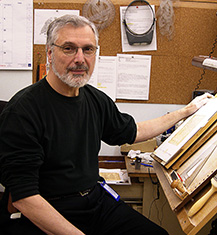
- John M. Mercanti

12th Chief Engraver of the United States Mint
- In office 2006–2010
- President: George W. Bush; Barack Obama
- Preceded by: Elizabeth Jones
- Succeeded by: Joseph Menna

Personal details
- Born: April 27, 1943 (age 83) Philadelphia, Pennsylvania
- Education: Pennsylvania Academy of Fine Arts, Philadelphia College of Art, Fleisher Art Memorial School
- Known for: Sculpture; Engraving
- Website: https://www.johnmercanti.com

John M. Mercanti (born April 27, 1943) is an American sculptor and engraver. He was the twelfth Chief Engraver of the United States Mint until his retirement in late 2010.

== Biography ==
Mercanti was born in Philadelphia. There, he attended the Pennsylvania Academy of Fine Arts, the Philadelphia College of Art and the Fleisher Art Memorial School. He also served in the Pennsylvania Army National Guard for six years.

In 1974, Mercanti joined the United States Mint as a sculptor-engraver after working as an illustrator. On May 19, 2006, he was appointed Chief Engraver of the U.S. Mint (also known as Supervisor of Design and Master Tooling Development Specialist). The position had been officially vacant for 15 years following the retirement of Elizabeth Jones, the Mint's eleventh Chief Engraver, in 1991.

In June 2011, Mercanti became a paid spokesperson for Goldline International and appeared in a television commercial for the company.

In August 2025, Mercanti entered into an exclusive partnership with GOVMINT, a numismatic retailer, making his complete personal archive of drawings, plasters and casts, spanning over 50 years, available to collectors for the first time.

In 2021, Mercanti was named one of Coin World's Most Influential People in Numismatics (1960-2020).

== Work ==
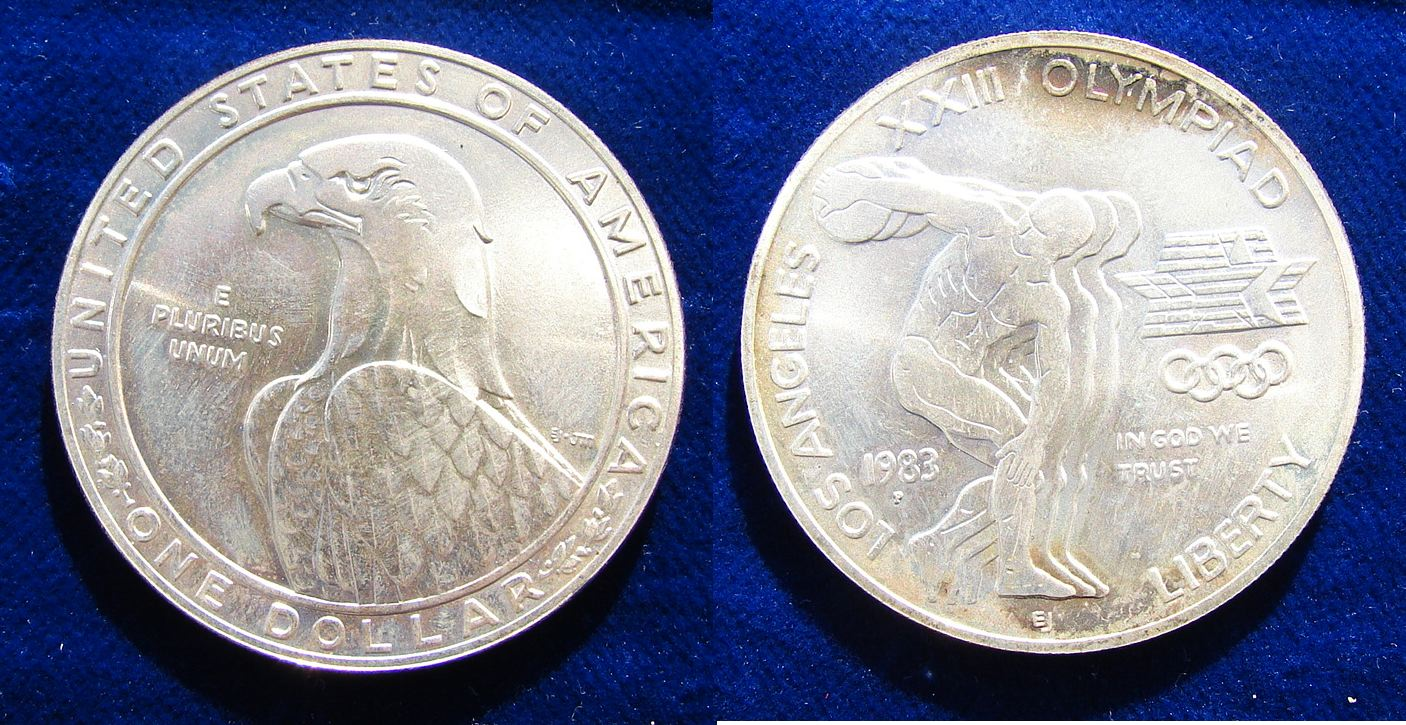
$1 Silver Coin 1983 P commemorating the Los Angeles Olympics 1984. Medallists were the Chief Engraver of the US Mint, Elizabeth Jones and John M. Mercanti

Mercanti has produced more coin and medal designs than any employee in United States Mint history (more than 100 as of 2006). Among these are the 1984 Olympic gold ten-dollar coin, the 1986 Statue of Liberty dollar coin, the 1989 Congress Bicentennial gold five-dollar coin, the obverse of the 1990 Eisenhower Centennial silver dollar, the obverse of the 1991 Mount Rushmore five-dollar coin, the obverse of the 1991 Korean War Memorial silver dollar, and the obverse of the 2005 John Marshall commemorative dollar. In addition to designing and sculpting a number of Congressional Gold Medals, Mercanti worked on quarters for the states of Arkansas, Iowa, North Carolina, Pennsylvania, and West Virginia for the 50 State Quarters Program.

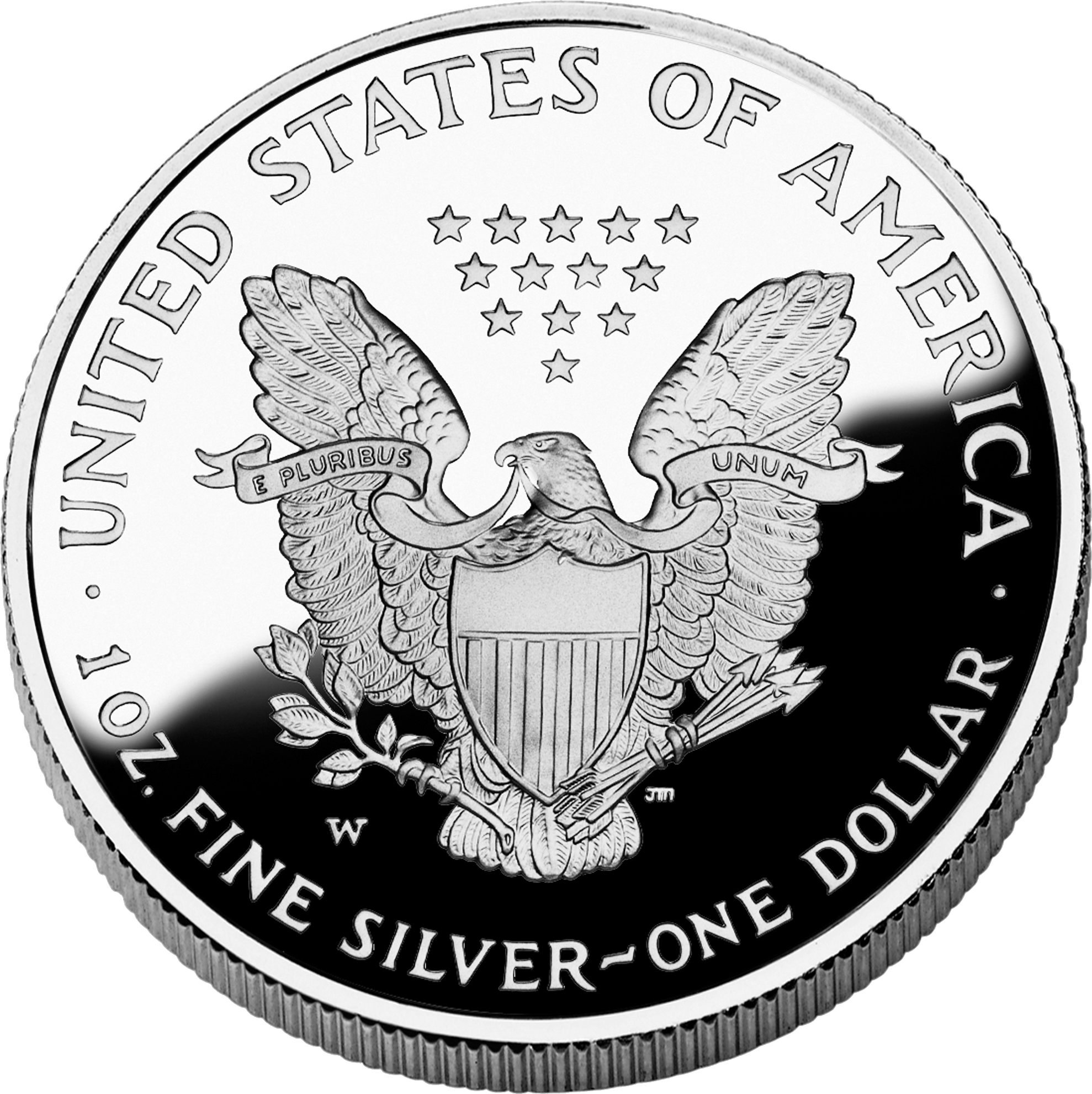
American Silver Eagle reverse (1986)

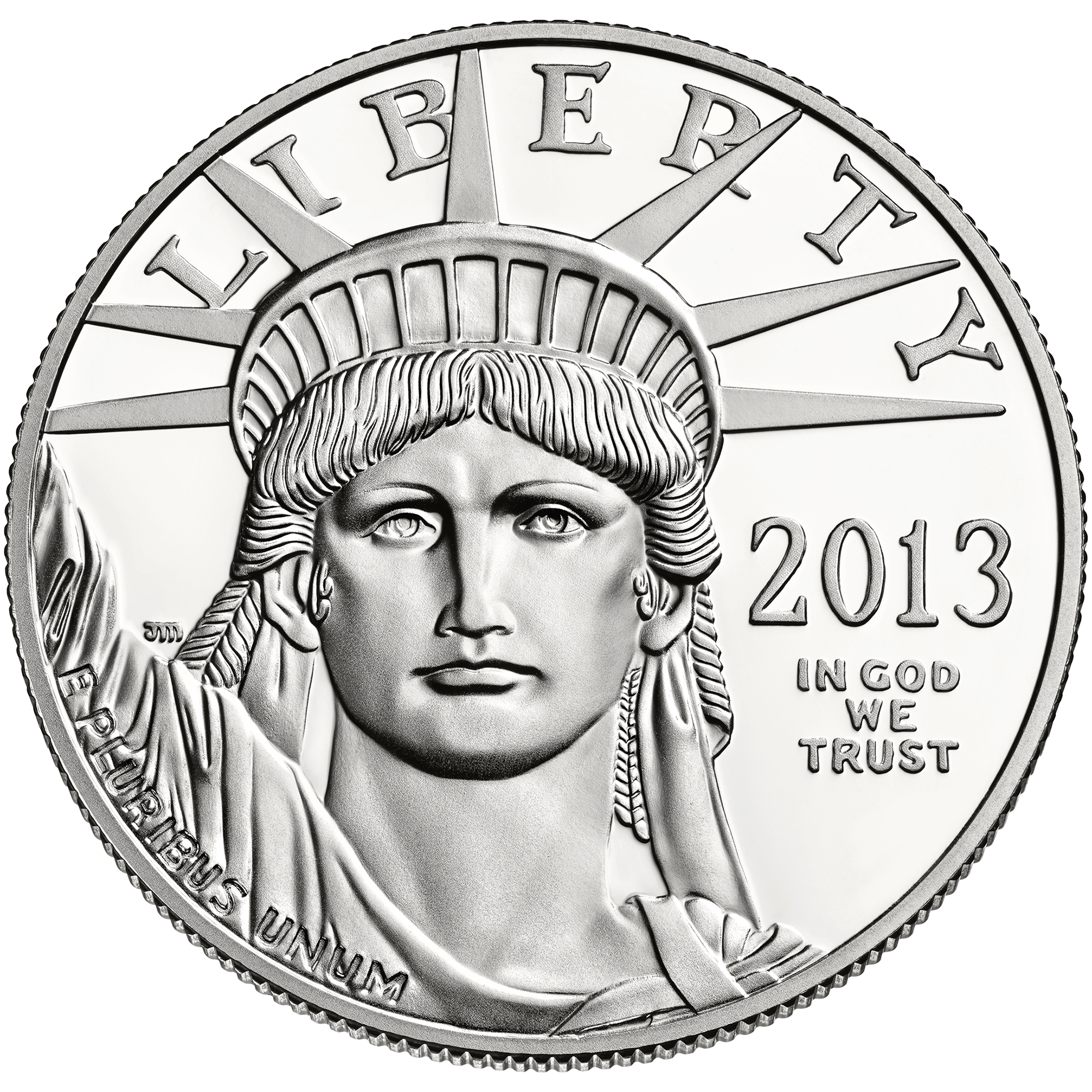
"Liberty Looking to the Future" American Platinum Eagle obverse (1997)

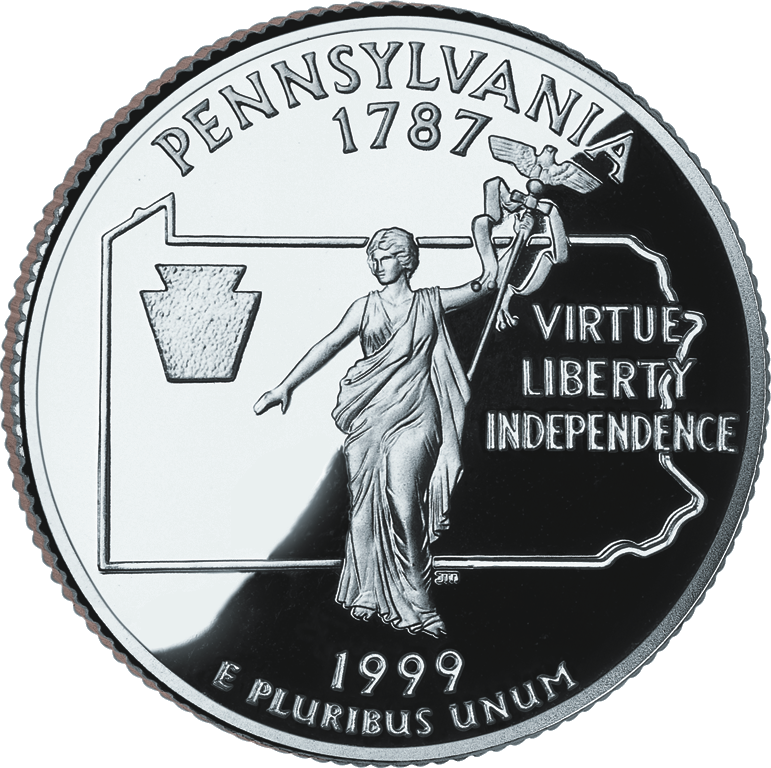
Pennsylvania state quarter reverse (1999)

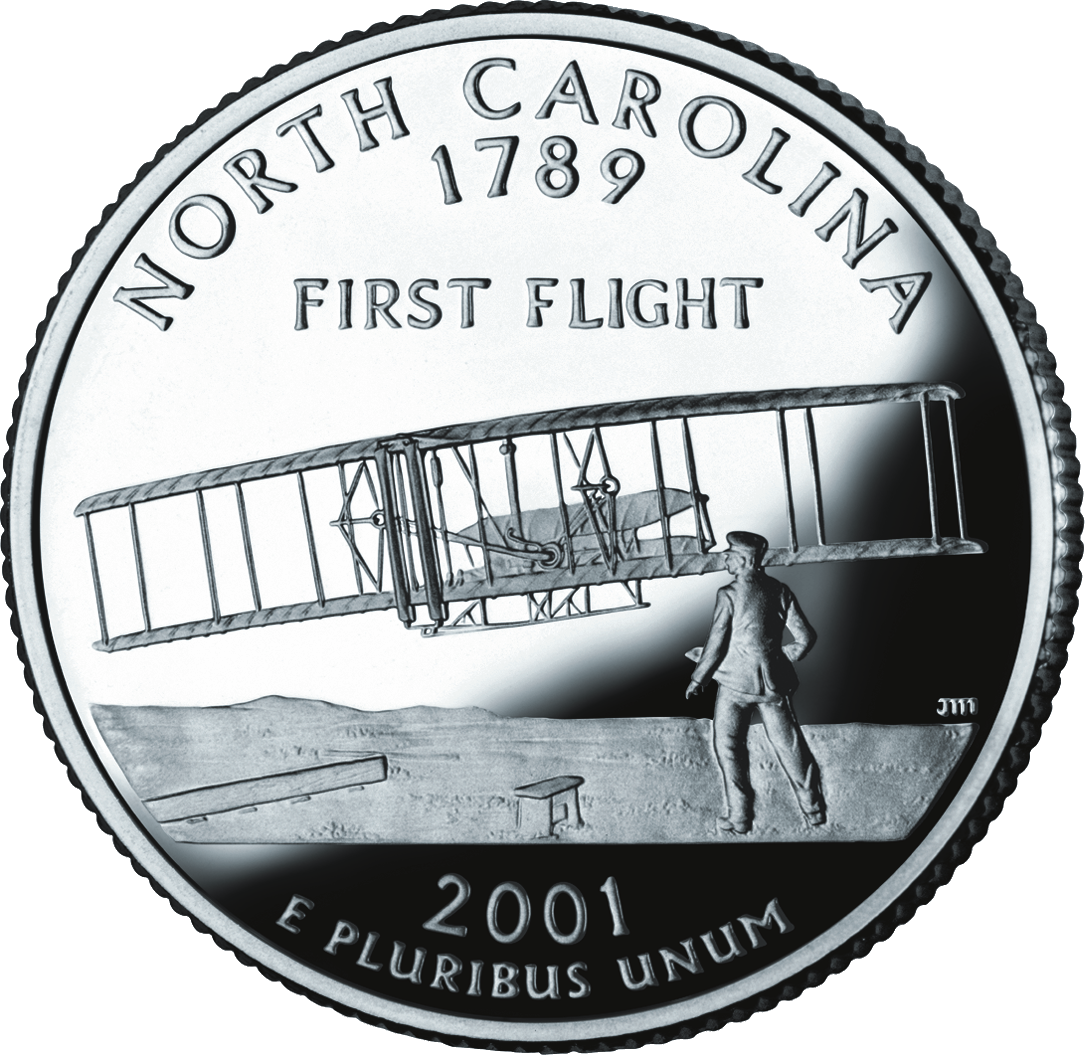
North Carolina state quarter reverse (2001)

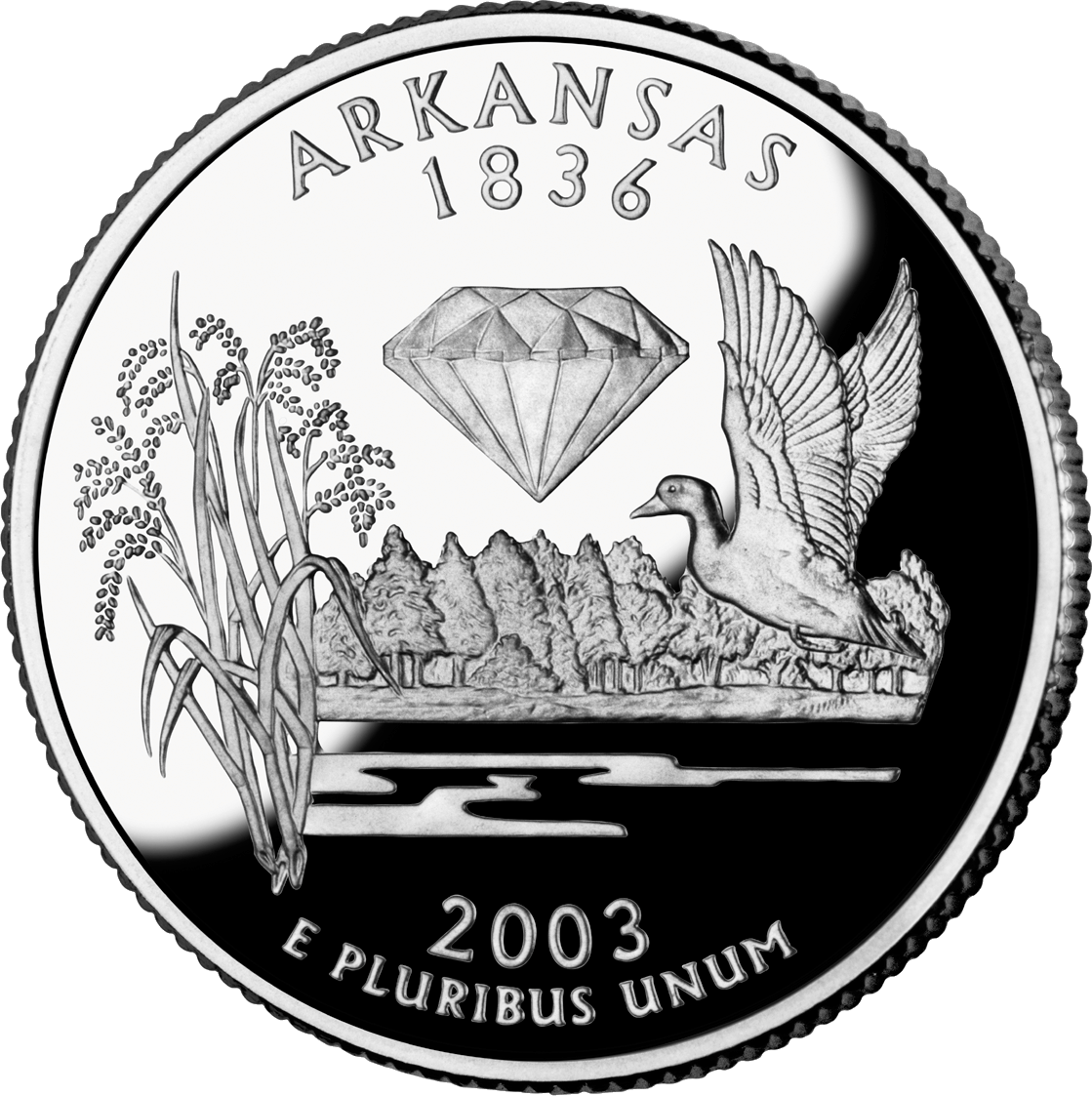
Arkansas state quarter reverse (2003)

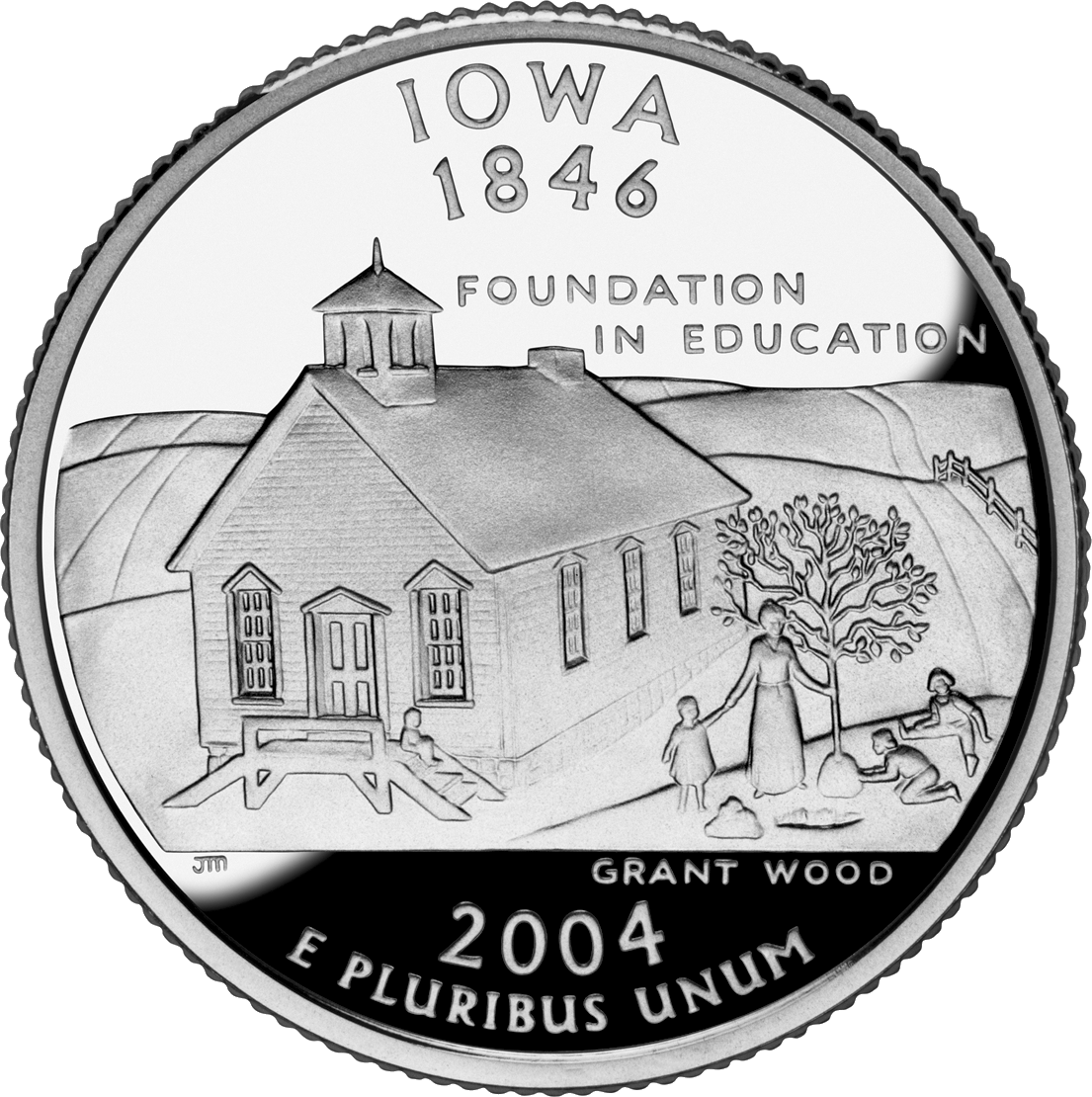
Iowa state quarter reverse (2004)

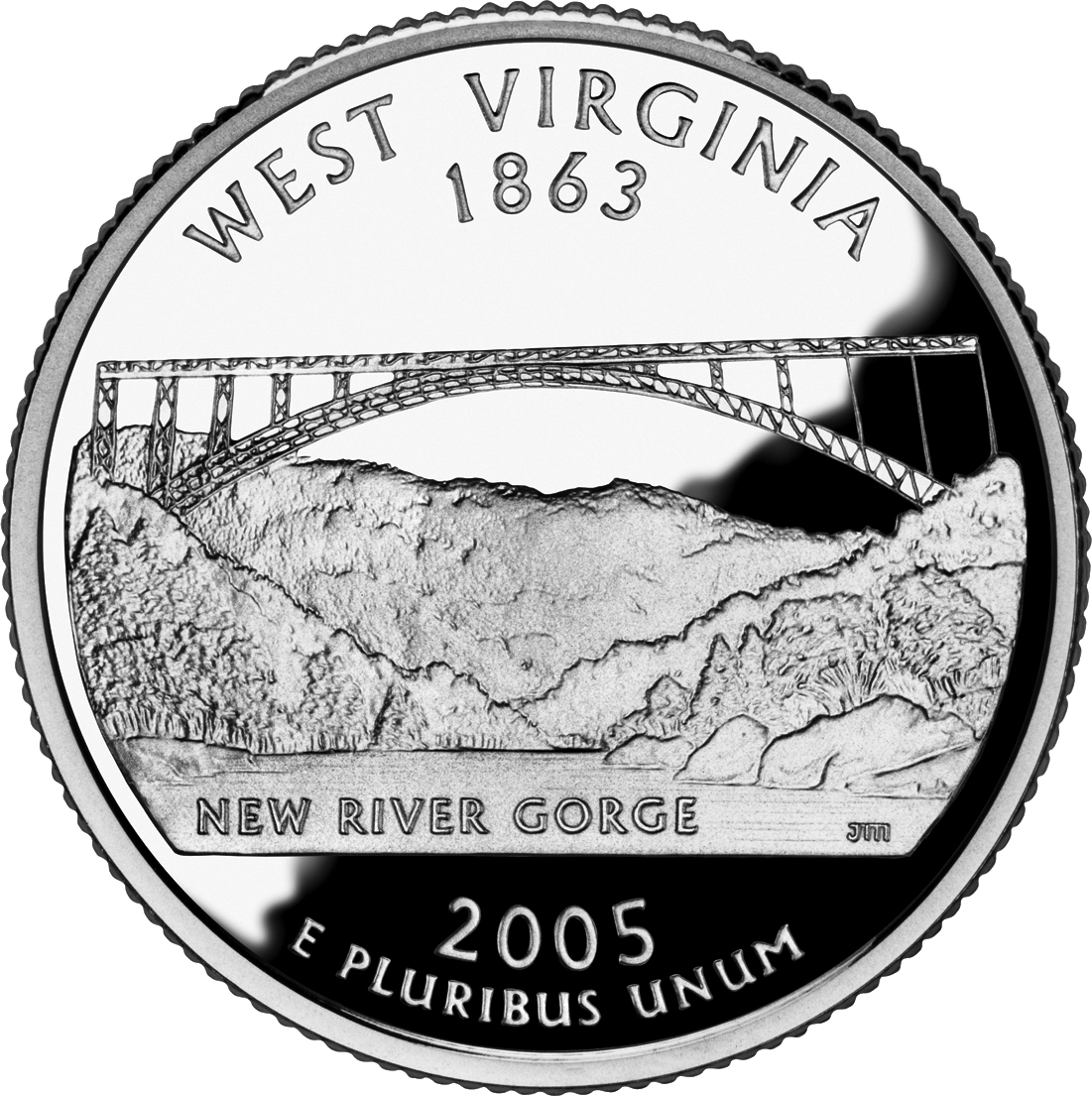
West Virginia state quarter reverse (2005)

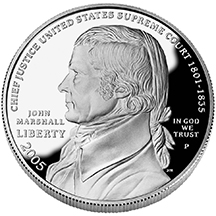
John Marshall commemorative dollar obverse (2005)

Government offices
Preceded by Elizabeth Jones	Chief Engraver of the U.S. Mint; 2006–2010	Succeeded by Joseph Menna
