= Elizabeth Jones (engraver) =

Former Chief Engraver of the United States Mint (born 1935)

11th Chief Engraver of the United States Mint
- In office 1981–1991
- President: Ronald Reagan; George H. W. Bush
- Preceded by: Frank Gasparro
- Succeeded by: John Mercanti

Personal details
- Born: May 31, 1935 (age 91) Montclair, New Jersey, U.S.
- Education: Montclair Kimberley Academy; Vassar College

Elizabeth Jones (born May 31, 1935) was the eleventh Chief Engraver of the United States Mint, holding this position from 1981 until her resignation in 1991. After her resignation, the position was left vacant for 15 years until John Mercanti was appointed to the post.

Born in Montclair, New Jersey, Jones was a 1953 graduate of the Montclair Kimberley Academy (formerly the Kimberley School until 1974) and received their 1985 Distinguished Alumni Award. She graduated from Vassar College in 1957.

== History ==
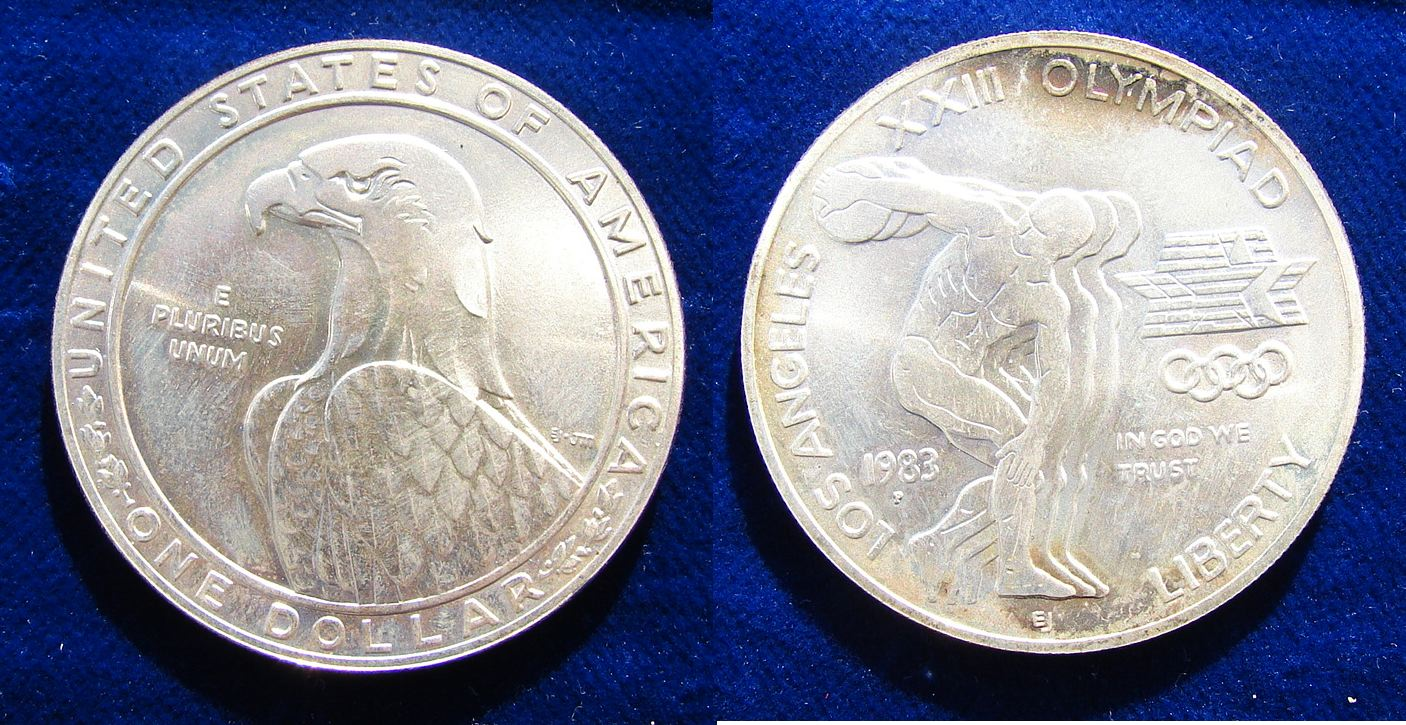
$1 Silver Coin 1983 P commemorating the Los Angeles Olympics 1984. Medallists were Elizabeth Jones and John M. Mercanti

Jones was just 46 when President Ronald Reagan appointed her as Chief Engraver, making her the first woman to hold this post. Although relatively young by chief engraver standards, by this time she had already built an impressive reputation as one of the leading medallists in the world. Her talent and distinctive style, which she describes as "mildly abstract," had earned her a lengthy series of commissions from such prestigious clients as The Franklin Mint, Medallic Art Company and the Judaic Heritage Society. When Frank Gasparro retired in 1981 after 16 years as chief engraver, friends in the art world and in Washington, D.C., urged her to apply. She did, and soon had a new job.

Jones was the designer of the 1983 Los Angeles Olympic one dollar coin, obverse. Her design incorporated the traditional discus thrower of conjoined outlines in three layers as if in stroboscopic motion.

In an article, “Her mark is on the coinage”, by Judy Klemesrud, The New York Times, June 26, 1983: ”She said she became interested in the rather obscure field of medallion making after meeting Renato Signorini, an Italian sculptor now deceased, who designed the official medal for the 1960 Olympic Games in Rome. "He's the one who's responsible for my becoming a medalist," she said. "I had never even thought of medals until I was 25 years old."

Government offices
Preceded by Frank Gasparro	Chief Engraver of the U.S. Mint; 1981–1990	Succeeded by John Mercanti
