= Il Covile =

Online magazine in Italy

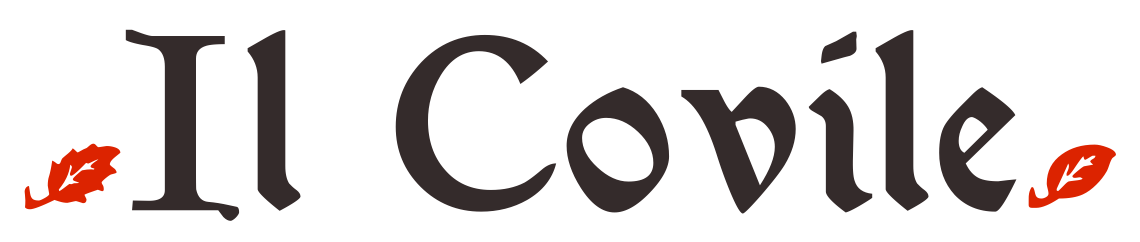
- Editor: Stefano Borselli
- Publisher: Il Covile
- Founded: 2009
- First issue: September 2009
- Country: Italy
- Based in: Florence
- Language: Italian
- Website: www.ilcovile.it
- ISSN: 2279-6924

Il Covile (Italian: The Lair) is an Italian online magazine.

== Profile ==
Edited by Stefano Borselli, the magazine was founded in September 2009, and its cultural line draws on Carl Schmitt's "Catholical form", on contemporary conservative thought (MacIntyre, Scruton) and on marxism of the second half of the twentieth-century (Cesarano, Camatte, Debord, Tronti). The magazine uses William Morris' font and Igino Marini's Fell types for the heading and the text type, while the pages are usually decorated with Baroque-era vignettes.

== Contents ==
The magazine covers topics ranging from architecture and planning (with the endorsement of the views of Christopher Alexander, Léon Krier, Nikos Salingaros), to critiques of Contemporary art (Jean Clair, Marc Fumaroli, Aude De Kerros) and opinions on the male identity (criticism of feminism and Gender Theory), to the Judaic and Christian roots of the occidental civilization. Il Covile also covers material culture, crafts and typography.

== Editorial Staff ==
Francesco Borselli, Riccardo De Benedetti, Aude de Kerros, Pietro De Marco, Armando Ermini, Luciano Funari, Giuseppe Ghini, Ciro Lomonte, Roberto Manfredini, Ettore Maria Mazzola, Alzek Misheff, Pietro Pagliardini, Almanacco romano, Gabriella Rouf, Nikos Salingaros, Andrea Sciffo, Stefano Serafini, Stefano Silvestri, Massimo Zaratin.

== See also ==
- List of magazines in Italy
