= Marine Corps 250th Anniversary commemorative coins =

US commemorative coins issued in 2025

The Marine Corps 250th Anniversary commemorative coins were a series of commemorative coins issued by the United States Mint in 2025. The coins commemorate the 250th anniversary of the United States Marine Corps, which was founded on November 10, 1775. The Mint had previously issued a silver dollar commemorating the 230th anniversary of the Marine Corps.

== Legislation ==
The 250th Anniversary of the United States Marine Corps Commemorative Coin Act (Pub. L. 118–10 (text) (PDF)) was passed by the 118th Congress and signed into law by President Joe Biden on July 26, 2023. The legislation authorized the United States Mint to strike commemorative coins for the 250th anniversary of the Marine Corps.

== Designs ==
The common reverse of the coins features the emblem of the Marine Corps

Designs for the coins were presented to the Citizens Coinage Advisory Committee on April 16, 2024 and Commission of Fine Arts on April 18. Representatives from the Marine Corps were present during the meetings. The designs were approved by Secretary of the Treasury Janet Yellen. The designs were revealed in a ceremony at the National Museum of the Marine Corps in Triangle, Virginia on July 17, 2014. The coins all featured a common reverse design depicting the official emblem of the Marine Corps. The reverse design was created by AIP artist and retired Mint sculptor-engraver Donna Weaver and sculpted by Mint Medallic Artist Craig Campbell.

=== Half dollar ===
The half dollar obverse was designed by Artistic Infusion Program (AIP) artist Emily Damstra and sculpted by Mint Medallic Artist David A. Custer. The design depicts a modern Marine and a Continental Marine with the inscription 250 YEARS OF HONOR, COURAGE, AND COMMITMENT.

=== Dollar ===
The dollar obverse depicts the flag raising at Iwo Jima during World War II. It was designed by AIP artist Ron Sanders and was sculpted by Phebe Hemphill.

=== Half eagle ===
The half eagle obverse depicts a Marine Corps color guard. The design was created by Weaver, and sculpted by Mint Medallic Artist John P. McGraw.

== Production ==
The half dollar is composed of a copper core with a layer of 75% copper and 25% nickel bonded to it. The dollar is struck in .999 fine silver, and the half eagle is composed of a 90% gold, 6% silver and 4% copper alloy. The Mint began striking coins on December 4, 2024. The coins were struck both in proof and uncirculated finishes. The gold half eagles were struck at the West Point Mint and the silver dollars were struck at the Philadelphia Mint. The proof half dollar was struck at the San Francisco Mint and the uncirculated half dollar was struck at the Denver Mint. The Mint is authorized to strike 50,000 half eagles, 400,000 silver dollars, and 750,000 half dollars.

== Release and reception ==
The Mint began accepting orders for the coins on its website on January 2, 2025. Collectors compared the release to the Marine Corps 230th Anniversary silver dollar. Surcharges from sales of the coins were to be paid to the Marine Corps Heritage Foundation.

== See also ==
- United States commemorative coins
- List of United States commemorative coins and medals (2020s)
