= John Keith Wells =

US Marine and recipient of the Navy Cross

- Born: February 5, 1922; Lakeview, Texas, U.S.
- Died: February 11, 2016 (aged 94) Arvada, Colorado, U.S.
- Allegiance: United States of America
- Branch: United States Marine Corps
- Service years: 1942–1959
- Rank: Major
- Conflicts: World War II: Battle of Iwo Jima
- Awards: Navy Cross; Purple Heart

John Keith Wells (February 5, 1922 – February 11, 2016) was a United States Marine during World War II who led one of the most decorated infantry platoons to come out of a single engagement and the first to raise a flag over the Japanese island of Iwo Jima during World War II, 3rd Platoon, Easy Company, 2nd Battalion, 28th Marines, 5th Marine Division. This platoon was made famous for its attack on Mount Suribachi and for raising the first flag on the summit.

== Before Iwo Jima ==
Wells was born in 1922 and raised in north Texas. He attended Texas A&M College from 1940 to 1942. He joined the Marine Corps in March 1942 and was selected for Officer Candidate School (OCS) shortly thereafter. Upon completion of OCS, Wells completed Marine Parachute Training School in August 1943. Lt. Wells was then deployed to Guadalcanal with the 1st Marine Regiment in December 1943. After his return from Guadalcanal, Wells was given command of 3rd Platoon, Easy Company, 2nd Battalion, 28th Marines, 5th Marine Division. He is quoted as saying "give me 50 Marines not afraid to die and I can take any position".

== Iwo Jima ==
Lt. Wells landed on the island of Iwo Jima and was quickly given the task of leading an assault at the base of Mount Suribachi. It was during this attack that Wells was awarded the Navy Cross (the 2nd highest award for valor). Part of his citation would read: "by his leadership and indomitable fighting spirit, 1st Lt Wells contributed materially to the destruction of at least twenty-five Japanese emplacements . . ..". During this attack Wells was wounded and evacuated to a hospital ship. 1st Lt. Wells would escape the hospital ship by convincing a corpsman to supply with him sulfa powder and morphine so he could join his platoon shortly after the first flag raising. Once Wells reached the base of Mt. Suribachi he was helped to the summit by one of the flag raisers, Charles Lindberg. When his commanding officer (Lt. Col. Chandler Johnson) learned of this, he ordered Wells to relinquish command of the platoon and return to the aid station. Command was then passed to Sgt. Ernest "Boots" Thomas (KIA several days later). Wells remained on the island, although unable to lead his troops, until the island was declared secure.

== After World War II ==
After World War II, Wells returned to Texas and enrolled at Texas Tech College and obtained a degree in Petroleum Geology in the summer of 1948. In 1959, 1st Lt. Wells was honorarily retired as a Major in the Marine Reserves. He wrote a memoir about his command of and war time experiences with 3rd Platoon, 28th Marines, 5th Marine Division entitled "Give Me 50 Marines Not Afraid to Die: Iwo Jima". Wells died February 11, 2016, at the age of 94 in Arvada, Colorado.
