= C. C. Beall =

American illustrator and painter

Cecil Calvert Beall
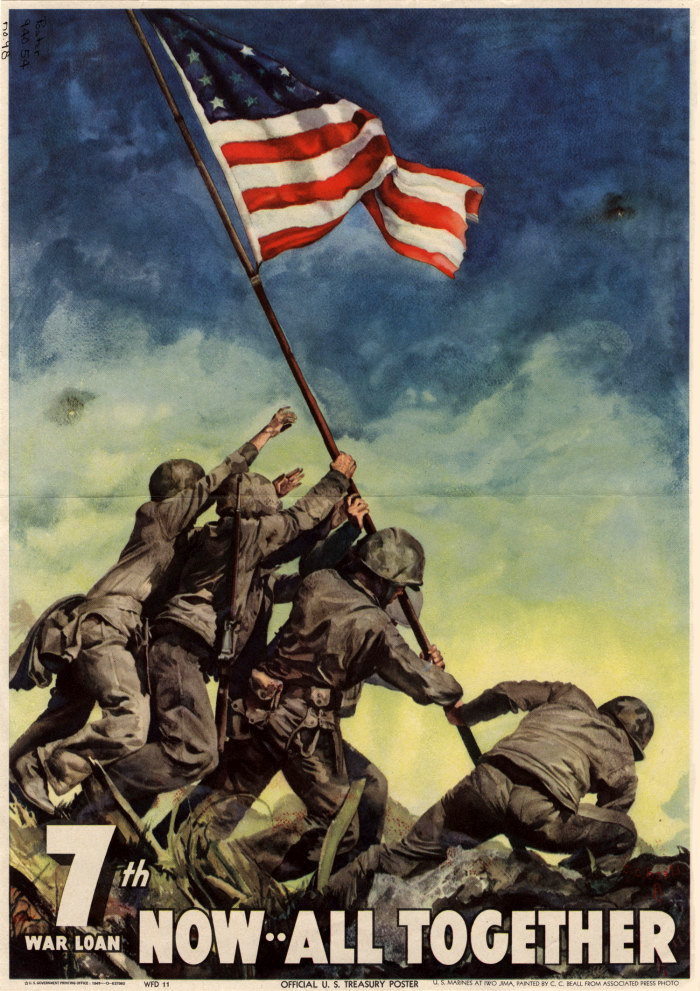
- C. C. Beall poster for the Seventh War Loan Drive (May 14 – June 30, 1945)
- Born: Cecil Calvert Beall; October 15, 1892; Saratoga, Wyoming, United States
- Died: May 4, 1970 (age 77); Tampa, Florida, United States
- Style: Commercial illustrator, portrait artist
- Spouse: Mildred Muriel Hall

Cecil Calvert Beall (October 15, 1892 – May 4, 1970) was an American commercial illustrator and portrait painter. He did watercolor art and drawings for magazines and comic books. Beall designed posters for the United States government for war loan drives during World War II.

== Early life ==
Beall was born on October 15, 1892, in Saratoga, Wyoming, with the given names Cecil Calvert. His parents were Charles W. Beall and Eugenia N. Beall. He had a brother who was a year older, Roger.

== Education ==
Beall received tutoring from the Canadian–American painter George Brant Bridgman at the Art Students League in New York City. While there he displayed his artwork and drawings at exhibits of the Society of Illustrators. Beall also attended Pratt Institute to learn the art of watercolor painting and poster drawing.

== Career ==
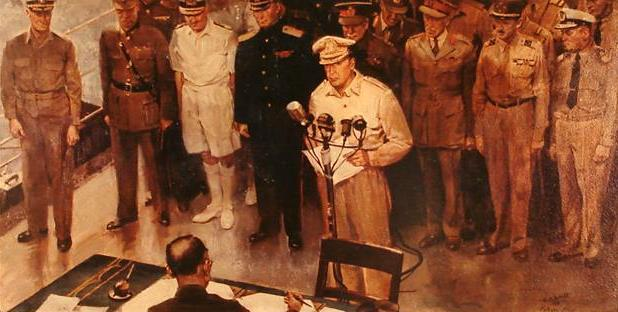
General MacArthur, surrender WWII on USS Missouri – painting by Beall

Beall did work for many of the leading periodicals of the twentieth century. His watercolor style was in a type of bold contrasting reflections, which was popular at the time. Some Meredith magazines that he produced paintings and colored drawings for included Collier's, Vanity Fair, Cosmopolitan, Woman's Home Companion, Saturday Evening Post, American Family Circle, and This Week. He also painted covers for Elks Magazine and Reader's Digest books.

Beall's 1936 painting of President Roosevelt for Collier's cover page led to the position as art director for the Democratic National Committee. Beall was temporarily an employee of the U. S. War Department. At the same time, he was also a correspondent-artist for several magazines, including Collier's, and painted portraits of decorated war heroes. Beall was an eyewitness to the 1945 official Japanese surrender on the USS Missouri. He painted General MacArthur at the event; his work later became the official portrait.

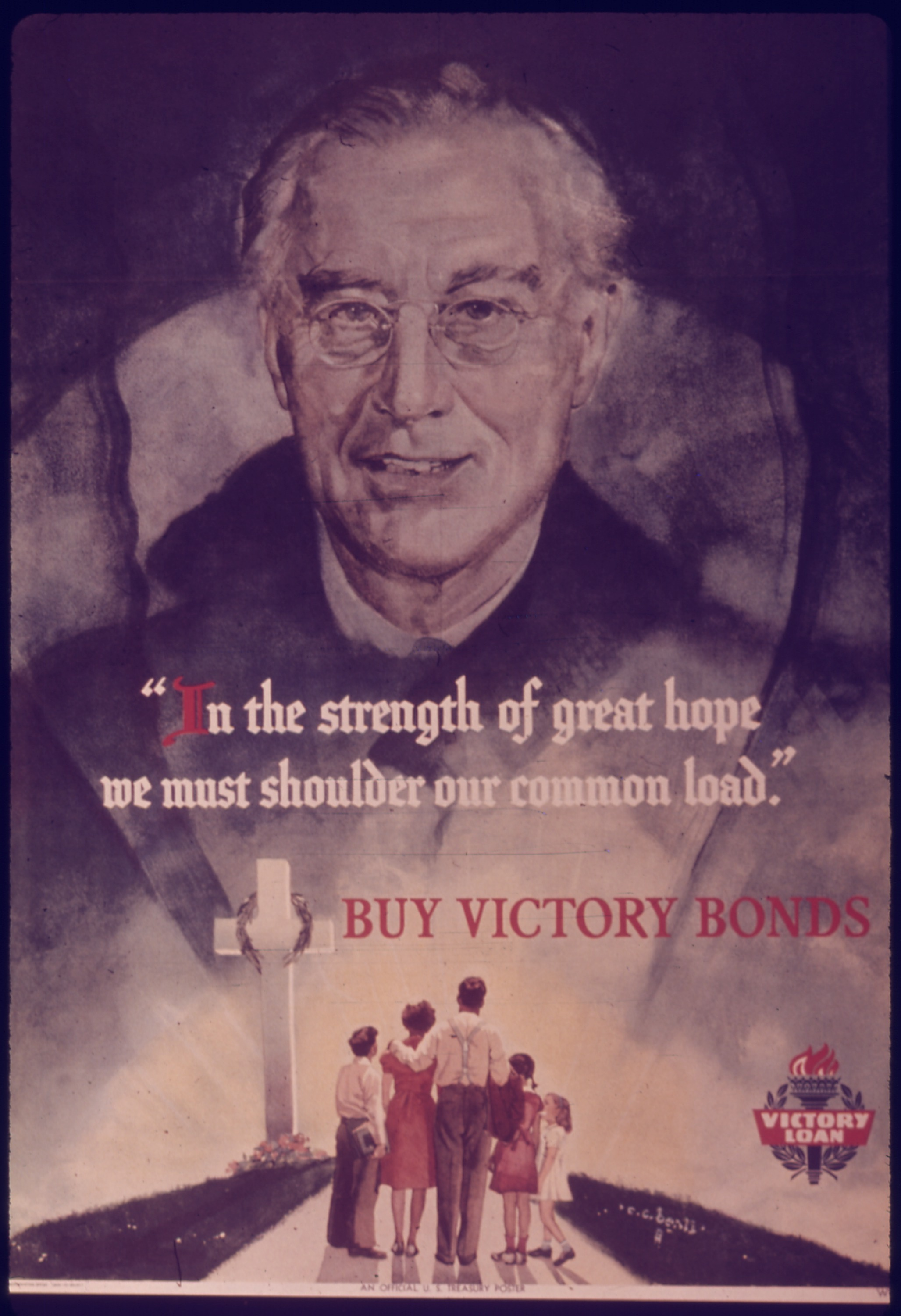
Roosevelt drawing by Beall for poster to promote U.S. Victory Bonds

== Posters ==
Beall's 1945 Treasury poster painting of Joe Rosenthal's photograph of the raising of the replacement American flag on Iwo Jima was used for the war campaign in the Seventh Loan drive. He said he did not change any of the lines in the original photograph, but merely colorized it. It was put on track to be the most displayed picture in history. The loan promotion brought in more than $26 billion in six weeks' time to help end World War II. The original American flag put up on Mount Suribachi was taken down as a memento. The total fund raised for all eight War Bond drives was $156 billion.

Beall's original drawing of U.S. President Roosevelt that was used for the World War II $200 E Bond was given to Mrs. Eleanor Roosevelt. The poster from this art work was labeled "In The Strength Of Great Hope We Must Shoulder Our Common Load." The formal presentation in October 1945 from Beall was in Washington, D.C., with the director of the Office of War Finance, Ted R. Gamiie.

== Family and death ==
Beall married Mildred Muriel Hall in 1920. They had three children: Charles (born 1922), Barbara (born 1924), and John (born 1928). He died at the home of his daughter 4 May 1970 in Valrico, Hillsborough, Florida. Florida, U.S., Death Index, 1877-1998 Name Cecil C Beall Age at Death 77 Birth Date 15 Oct 1892 Death Date 4 May 1970 Death Place Hillsborough [County], Florida, United States

== Society memberships ==
- American Water Color Society
- Hudson Valley Art Association
- Society of Illustrators
- Salmagundi Club
