= James Michels =

US Marine corporal (1918-1982)

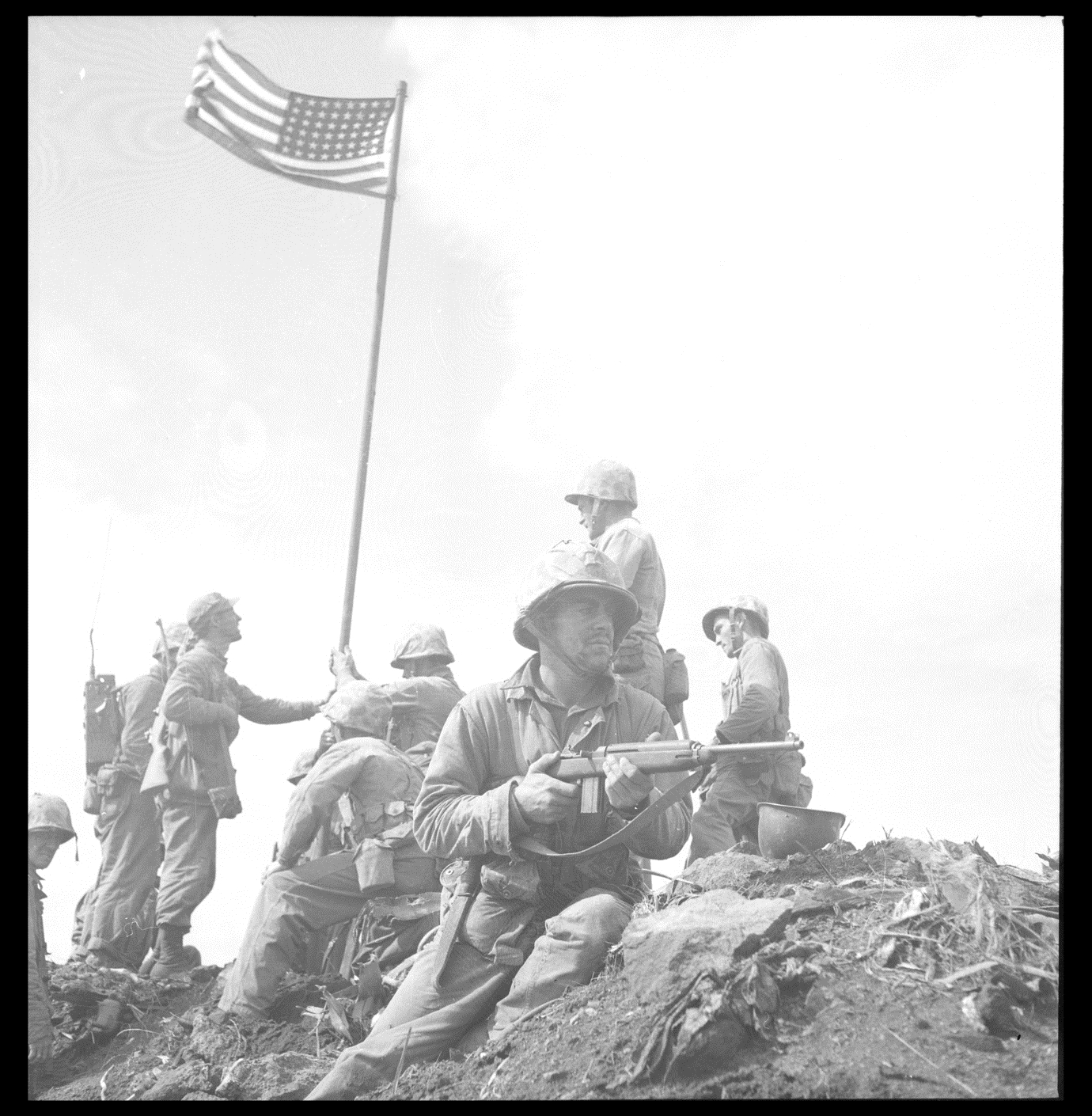
- Michels, in foreground with rifle, after the first flag raising at Iwo Jima (February 23, 1945)
- Born: January 18, 1918; Chicago, Illinois
- Died: January 17, 1982 (aged 63); Riverside, Illinois
- Military career
- Allegiance: United States
- Branch: United States Marine Corps
- Rank: Corporal
- Unit: 2nd Battalion, 28th Marines
- Conflicts: World War II; *Battle of Iwo Jima
- Awards: Purple Heart Medal; Combat Action Ribbon; World War II Victory Medal

James R. Michels (January 18, 1918 – January 17, 1982) was a United States Marine corporal who served in World War II. He was part of the combat patrol that climbed up Mount Suribachi and raised the first American flag during the Battle of Iwo Jima, on February 23, 1945.

== Biography ==
=== Birthplace ===
Michels was born in Chicago, Illinois, in 1918.

=== World War II ===
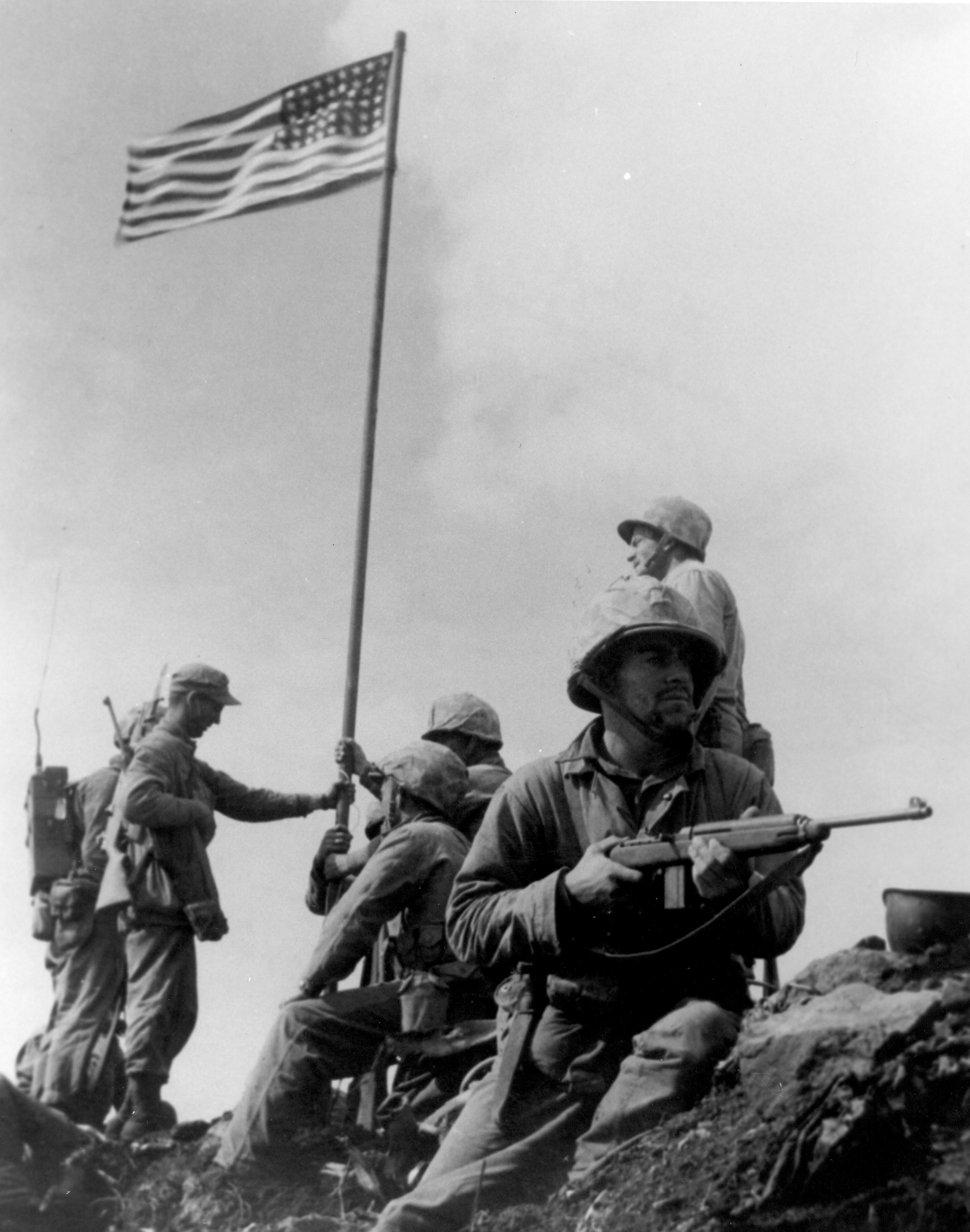
Marine Staff Sergeant Louis Lowery's most widely circulated picture of the first American flag on Mount Suribachi (after the flag was raised): Left to right: 1st Lt. Harold G. Schrier (kneeling beside radioman), Pfc. Raymond Jacobs (radioman), Sgt. Henry Hansen (soft cap, holding flagstaff), Pvt. Phil Ward (holding lower flagstaff), Plt. Sgt. Ernest I. Thomas, Jr. (seated), Phm2c. John Bradley, USN (holding flagstaff above Ward), Pfc. James Michels (in foreground with M1 carbine), Cpl. Charles W. Lindberg (standing, extreme right)

Michels joined the United States Marine Corps during World War II. He took part in the Battle of Iwo Jima which began on February 19, 1945, while serving as a rifleman with the Third Platoon of Company E, 2nd Battalion, 28th Marines, 5th Marine Division.

==== Flag raising ====
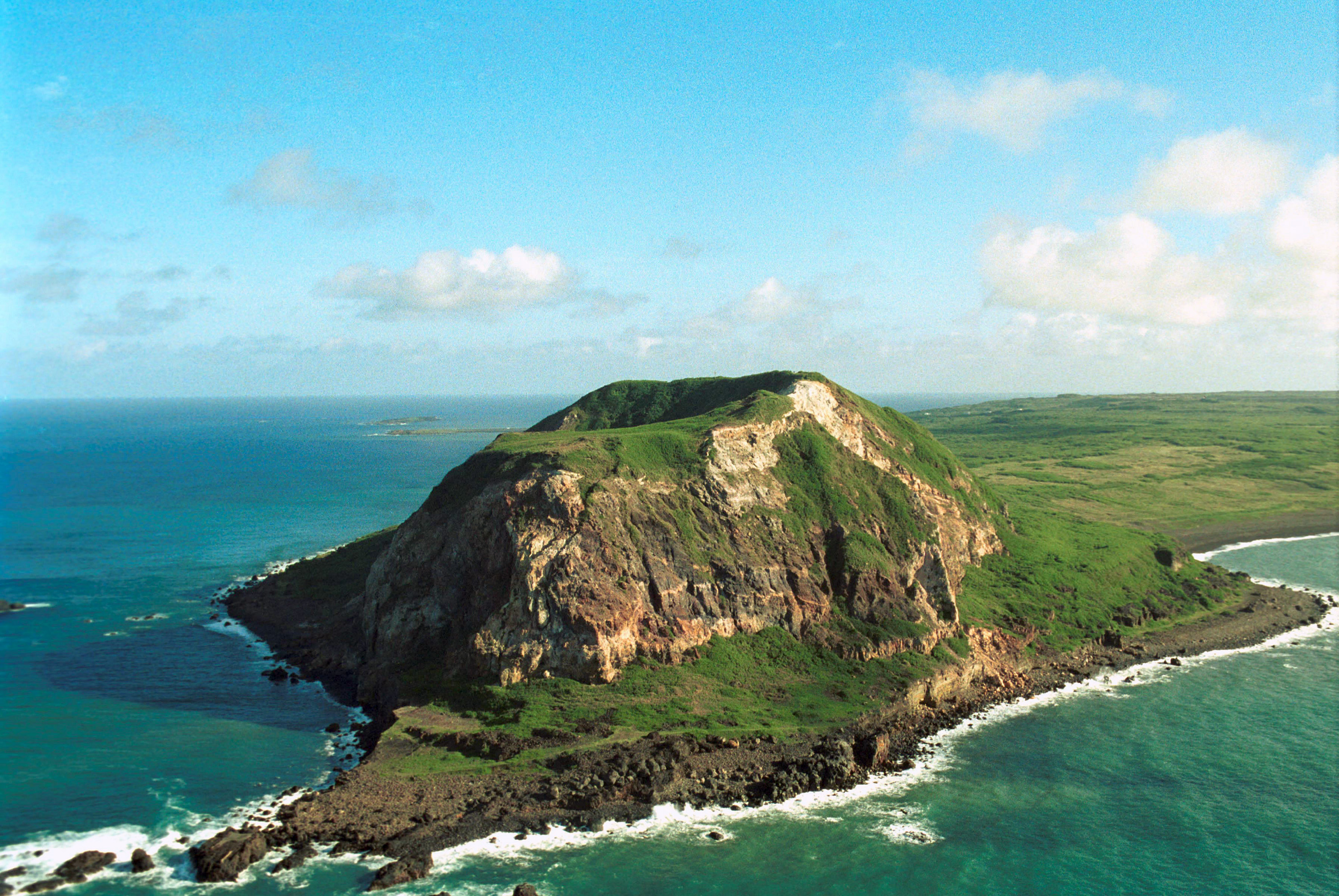
Mount Suribachi on Iwo Jima

Michels landed on the southern end of Iwo Jima with his unit on February 19. He was wounded by shrapnel to his thumb from an enemy mortar at the base of Mount Suribachi on February 21. On February 23, Michels was part of the 40-man combat patrol that was sent at 8 AM to climb up the east slope of Mount Suribach to seize and occupy the crest. First Lieutenant Harold Schrier, who led the patrol, was to raise an American flag he was given to signal that the mountaintop was captured. Once Schrier and his men were on top, a Japanese iron water pipe was found to attach the flag unto. Lieutenant Schrier, Corporal Charles Lindberg, and Sergeant Henry Hansen, tied the flag unto the pipe while Private Phil Ward held the bottom end of the pipe horizontally off the ground. Platoon Sergeant Ernest Thomas was in among the three Marines watching, armed with his rifle and a grenade in hand, while Michels with his carbine was watching for an enemy attack on the group while this was all going on.

The flagstaff was then carried to the highest point on the crater and raised and planted in the ground by Schrier, Thomas, and Hansen at approximately 10:30 AM. Seeing the raising of the National colors immediately caused a cheering reaction from the Marines, sailors, and Coast Guardsmen on the beach below and from the men on the ships near the beach at the southern end of the island. After the flag was raised, Michels was photoed near the flagstaff by Marine Corps photographer Staff Sergeant Louis Lowery. In the photo he is shown holding a M1 carbine in a defensive position. Shortly thereafter, fighting took place between the Marines and Japanese because of the flag raising, the Japanese were hiding in caves on the mountain when they saw the flag go up.

Some two hours later, in order for the American flag to be seen more easily from the ships, beaches, and land on the north side of Mount Suribachi, it was decided that a larger flag should be sent up Mount Suribachi to replace the first flag. The replacement flag attached to another and heavier pipe was raised on the mountain top simultaneous with the lowering of the first flagstaff. It was the black-and-white photograph shot of the second flag-raising by Associated Press photographer Joe Rosenthal which became renowned, made the second-flag raisers famous, and led to the creation of the huge Marine Corps War Memorial (sometimes called the Iwo Jima Memorial) in 1954, at Arlington, Virginia.

=== Post-war and death ===
After the war, Michels returned to and lived in Riverside, Illinois. He died there on January 17, 1982, and is buried in Queen of Heaven Cemetery in Hillside, Illinois.

== Military awards ==
Michels' military decorations and awards include:

- Purple Heart Medal
- Navy Presidential Unit Citation
- American Campaign Medal
- Asiatic-Pacific Campaign Medal with one 3/16" bronze star
- Navy Occupation Service Medal
- World War II Victory Medal

The Marine Corps Good Conduct Medal required 4 years service in World War II.

== Legacy ==
Michels was immortalized in Marine Staff Sergeant Lou Lowery's photograph of the first American flag flying over Mount Suribachi on Iwo Jima. Michels is shown on guard with his M1 carbine while three other members of the patrol place the flagstaff more securely into the ground to keep it vertical in the high winds on the volcano.

== See also ==
- Marine Corps War Memorial
- Flags of Our Fathers
