= Raymond Jacobs =

United States Marine and news reporter (1926-2008)

Raymond E. Jacobs
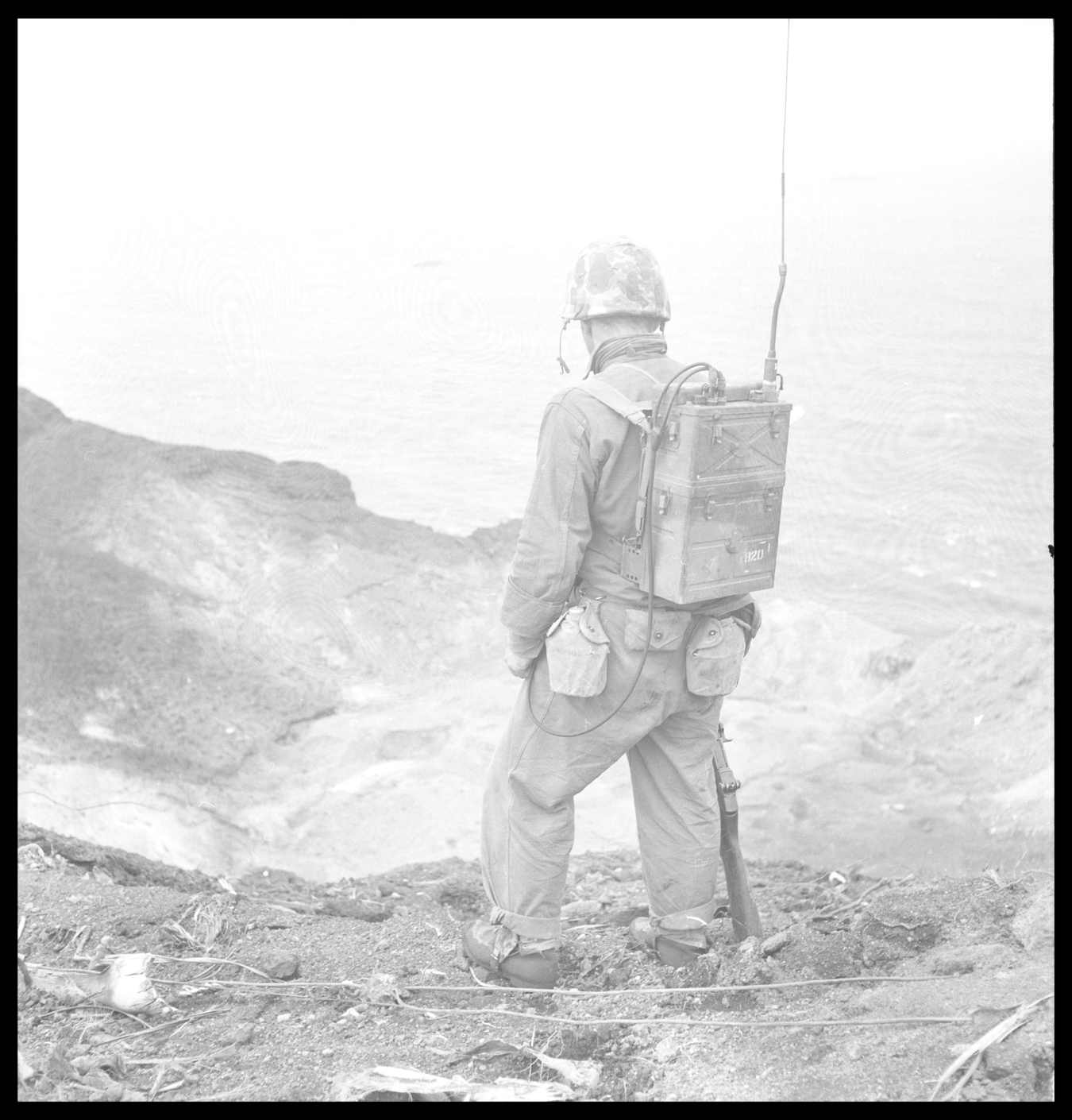
- Raymond Jacobs atop Mount Suribachi during the Battle of Iwo Jima
- Born: January 24, 1926; Bridgeport, Connecticut, U.S.
- Died: January 29, 2008 (aged 82); Redding, California, U.S.
- Burial place: Northern California Veterans Cemetery, Igo, California
- Military career
- Allegiance: United States
- Branch: United States Marine Corps
- Service years: 1943–1946; 1950–1951
- Rank: Sergeant
- Conflicts: World War: Battle of Iwo Jima
- Awards: Combat Action Ribbon, Purple Heart

Raymond E. Jacobs (January 24, 1926 – January 29, 2008) was an American and United States Marine Corps sergeant who served in combat during World War II. Jacobs was a member of the combat patrol that climbed up to the top of Mount Suribachi during the Battle of Iwo Jima and raised the first U.S. Flag on February 23, 1945. Afterwards, he was a news reporter and served during the Korean War as an instructor at Camp Pendleton, California.

== Early life ==
Jacobs was born on January 24, 1926, in Bridgeport, Connecticut. His family moved to Los Angeles, California in 1933. He was a football star at Polytechnic High School in the Los Angeles area.

=== U.S. Marine Corps, World War II ===
Jacobs enlisted in the Marine Corps in May 1943. In September, after he completed recruit training in San Diego, he volunteered for Marine Raider training at Camp Pendleton. After the Marine Raiders were disbanded in February 1944, he was transferred to the 2nd Battalion, 28th Marine Regiment, 5th Marine Division at Camp Pendleton. He was assigned to F Company. In September, the division departed for Hilo, Hawaii (Camp Tarawa) to continue training for follow on action in the Pacific Theatre. He was trained there to be a radioman in F Company. After training and preparing for the invasion of Iwo Jima, the 28th Marines left Hawaii in December, embarking upon amphibious transports, and after a few days liberty in Pearl Harbor, they set sail heading west on January 7, 1945. The regiment stopped at Eniwetok on February 5, conducted a practice landing on Tinian on February 13, and arrived off the coast of Iwo Jima on February 16.

==== Battle of Iwo Jima ====
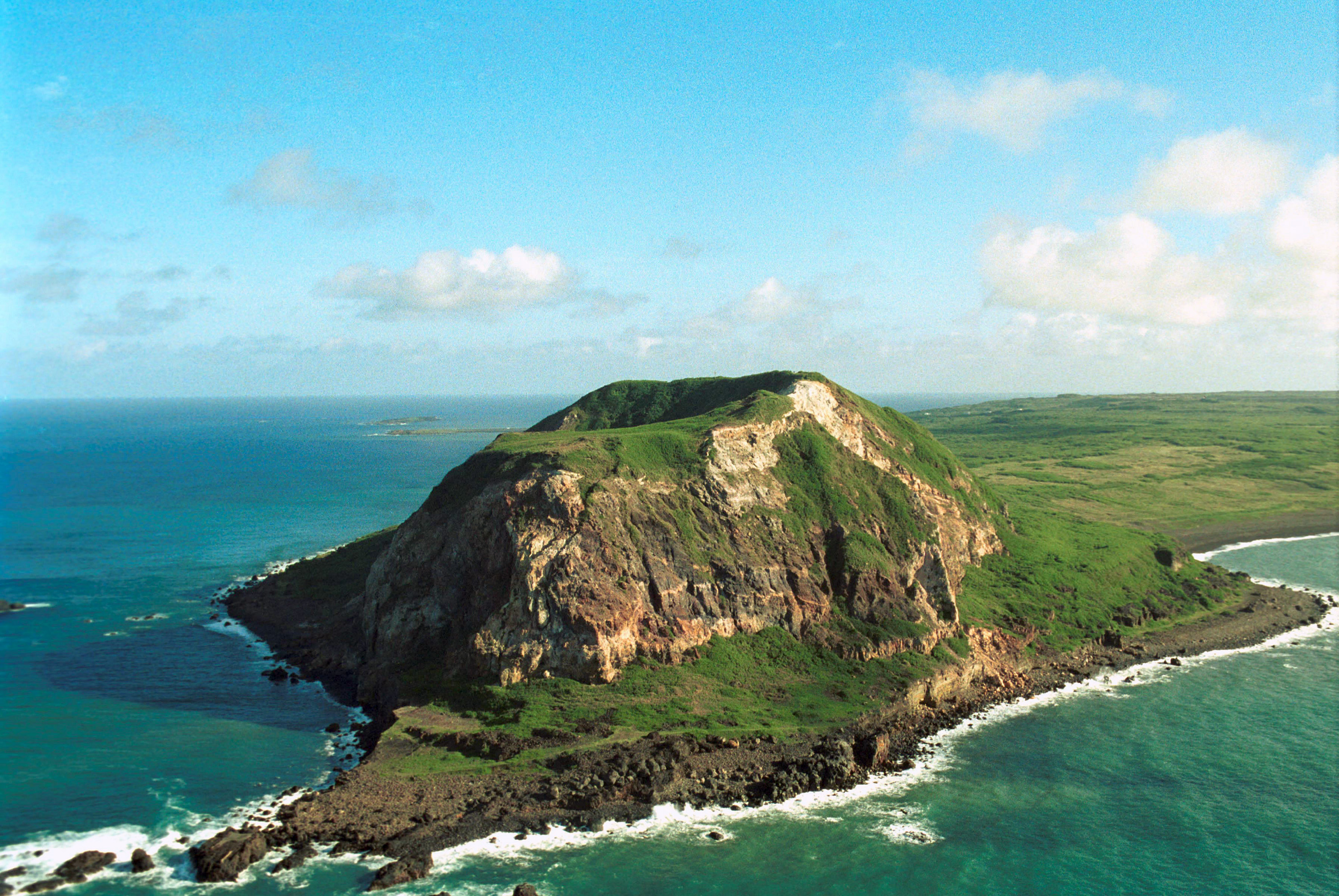
Mount Suribachi on Iwo Jima.

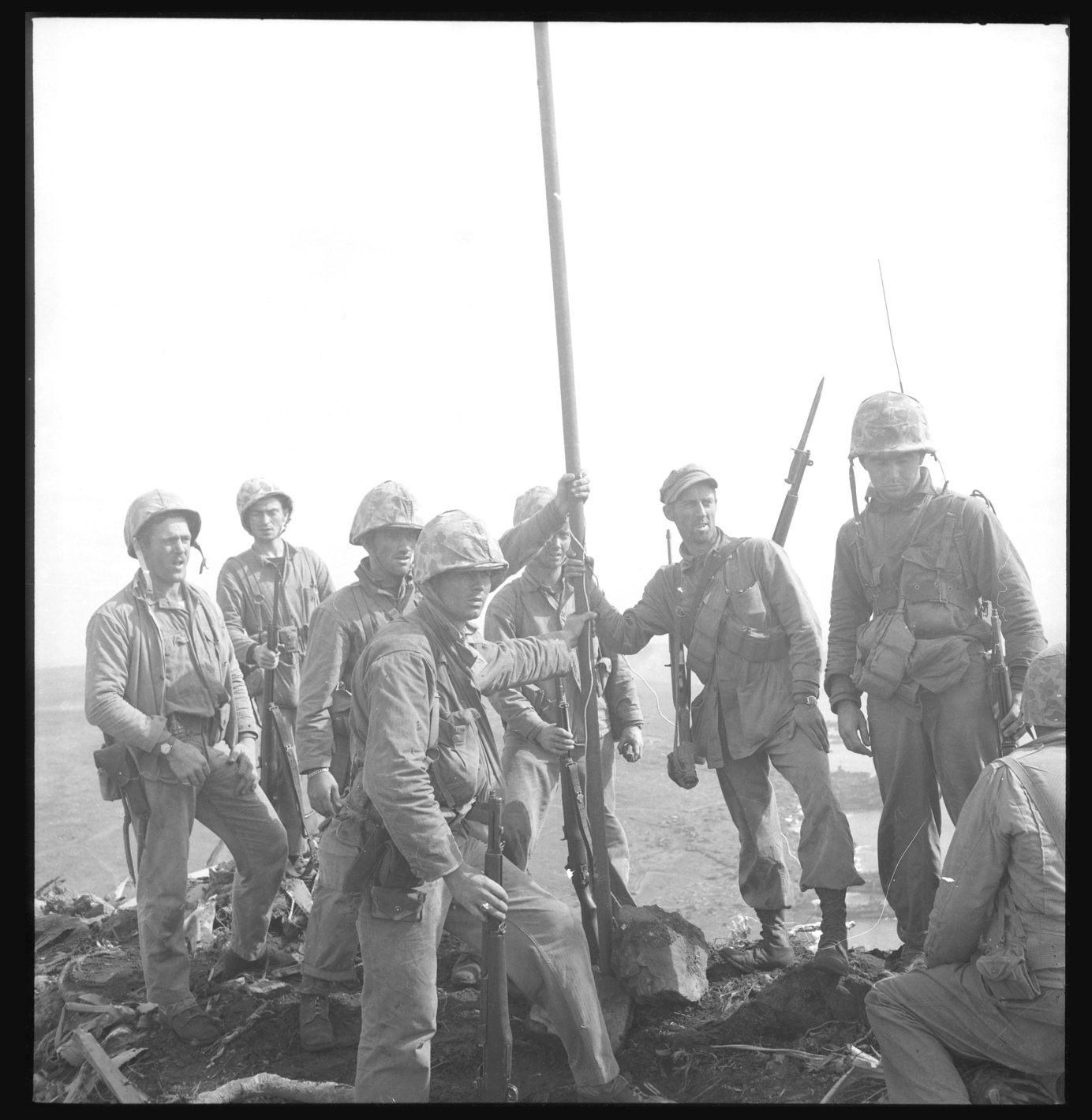
First flag raising, with Jacobs standing at right

Jacobs took part in the Second Battalion, 28th Marines, amphibious assault landing on Green Beach at the southern part of Iwo Jima near Mount Suribachi on February 19, 1945. From 19 to 23 February, the 28th Marines fought to secure Mount Suribachi. On February 23 at 8 AM, First Lieutenant Harold Schrier, the E Company executive officer, led a 40-man combat patrol from Third Platoon, E Company, 2nd Battalion, 28th Marines up Mount Suribachi to siege and occupy the crest. Accompanying Schrier was Jacobs, a radioman from F Company who was reassigned to him for the patrol. Schrier was to raise an American flag he was given to signal that the mountaintop was captured. Once on top of the volcano, a section of a Japanese water pipe was found that became the flagstaff for the flag. Schrier and two other Marines attached the flag to the pipe which was then carried to the highest spot on the crater.

At approximately 10:20-10:35 a.m., Lt. Schrier, Platoon Sergeant Ernest Thomas, and Sergeant Henry Hansen, raised the flag (Thomas was ordered to report aboard the flagship USS Eldorado on February 25, and during an interview with a CBS radio broadcaster said that Schrier, and Sgt. Henry Hansen, and he, had actually raised the flag). Seeing the raising of the national colors immediately caused a reaction of loud cheering from the Marines, sailors, and coast guardsmen on the beach below and from the men on the ships near the beach; the ships whistles and horns went off too. Hansen was killed in action on Iwo Jima on March 1, and Thomas on March 3. On March 10, 1945, Jacobs was wounded by enemy mortar fire and was evacuated off Iwo Jima. The actual raising of the first flag on Mount Suribachi had not been photographed.

In the early afternoon, a larger replacement flag was brought up Mount Suribachi by the Easy Company runner (messenger) which was then attached unto another Japanese steel pipe. This flag was raised by six Marines while the first flag was lowered. A photograph of the second flag raising by Associated Press photographer Joe Rosenthal appeared in the newspapers, became renowned world-wide, made the second flag-raisers and Rosenthal famous, and led to the creation of the huge Marine Corps War Memorial (sometimes referred to as the Iwo Jima Memorial) in 1954, in Arlington, Virginia.

== Post World War II ==
Jacobs was honorably discharged from the Marine Corps in 1946. He then went to work as a reporter, news anchor, news director, and editorial director for KTVU in Oakland, California for 34 years before retiring on July 1, 1992. In 1950, Jacobs was called up for Marine Corps service during the Korean War. He served as a Marine instructor in California until he was honorably discharged with the rank of sergeant in August 1951.

=== World War II photo claim ===
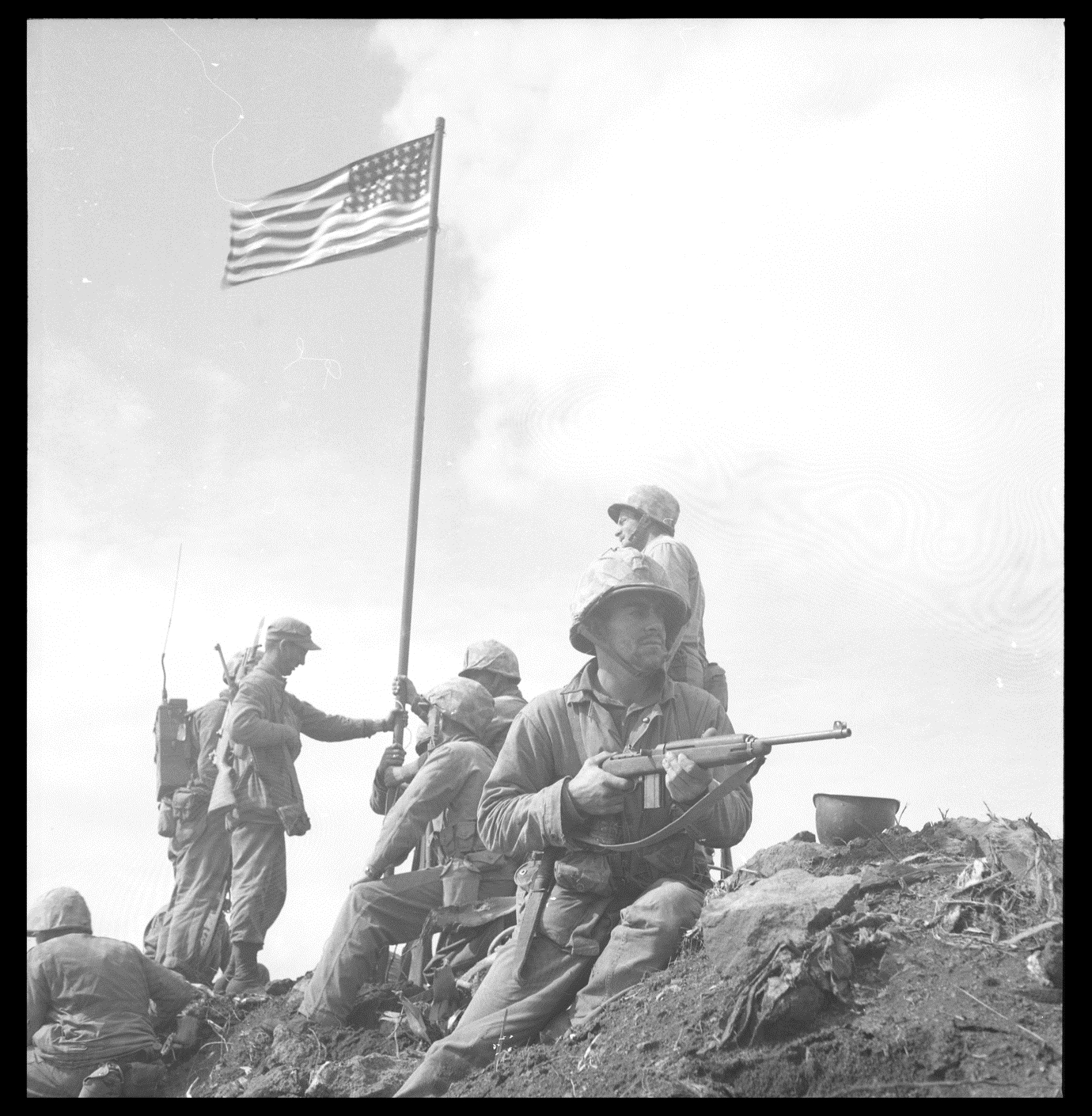
Uncropped version of SSgt. Lowery's most widely circulated photograph of the first American flag flown on Mount Suribachi, after the flag was raised. From left: Pfc. Harold Schultz (on guard), 1st Lt. Harold G. Schrier (left bottom side of radioman), Pfc. Raymond Jacobs (radioman), Henry "Hank" Hansen (cloth cap holding flagpipe with left hand), Pvt. Phil Ward (helmeted, holding lower pipe with both hands, Platoon Sgt. Ernest "Boots" Thomas (seated), PhM2c John Bradley, USN (helmeted, standing above Ward with right hand on pipe), Pfc. James Michels (holding M1 carbine), and Cpl. Charles W. Lindberg (standing above Michels).

Jacobs and his family spent his later years trying to prove that he actually was the Marine radio operator who was photographed on top of Mount Suribachi beneath the first American flag several times by Staff Sergeant Louis R. Lowery (a combat photographer with Leatherneck magazine). Although Jacobs's face is not visible in Lowery's most widely circulated photograph of the first flag flown on Mount Suribachi, his claim that it is definitely him was based on other black and white photographs of him taken by Lowery and other combat photographers near the first flag with Lieutenant Schrier. The radioman in the most famous of Lowery's photographs was assumed for years to be a Marine in F Company named Louis Charlo, or Pfc. Gene Marshall, the E Company radio operator, or an unknown Marine. Charlo (KIA March 2, 1945), who was not a radioman, was identified as being on Mount Suribachi near the flag (F Company followed Schrier's E Company patrol up the mountain) after Schrier's patrol climbed up the mountain, captured the summit, and raised the flag. Marshall claimed he was on top of Mount Suribachi, but has not ever been identified as being there. Jacobs said he was ordered back down Mount Suribachi sometime after the flag raising.

Jacobs claimed that on February 23, 1945, he was assigned as the radioman for Lt. Schrier and his 40-man patrol from E Company who went up Mount Suribachi after a 4-man reconnaissance patrol (included Charlo) from Third Platoon, F Company (Jacobs's company) which had been sent up the mountain an hour earlier, came down. The other men involved in the patrol and first flag raising have all died. In 2008, just after Jacobs had died, Annette Amerman, a historian with the Marine Corps History Division, said "there are many that believe" Jacobs was the radioman. "However, there are no official Marine Corps records produced at the time that can prove or refute Mr. Jacobs' location." There has not been a Marine photo of Marshall to compare to Lowery's photos. There are however, several photo comparisons of Jacobs that do verify he is the radioman with Lt. Schrier on Mount Suribachi, and Los Angeles newspaper accounts (Associated Press Dispatch, beginning February 24, 1945) which support Jacobs's testimonies that he was personally interviewed on top of Mt. Suribachi after the first flag-raising. His claims are also supported by his letters home. In 2019, a Marine Corps investigation of the two flag raisings on Mount Suribachi confirmed that Jacobs was indeed Lt. Schrier's radio operator who was photographed several times on top of Mount Suribachi near the first flag after it was raised.

Jacobs had disputed the official identifications in Lowery's picture and asserted that it should be: Pfc. James Robeson [Pfc. Harold Schultz] (in Lowery's second photo, in lower left corner) [behind Hansen], Pfc. Raymond Jacobs (carrying radio), 1st Lt. Harold Schrier (kneeling behind Jacobs) [left bottom side of Jacobs], Sgt. Henry Hansen (utility cap, holding flagpole), unknown Marine [Pvt. Phil Ward] (lower right hand securing flagpole), Platoon Sgt. Ernest Thomas (seated), PhM2c. John Bradley, USN (helmeted, above Thomas securing flagpole with both hands), Pfc. James Michels (holding M1 carbine), and Cpl. Charles Lindberg (standing above Michels).

Due to an agreement with the Associated Press and the Marine Corps over Rosenthal's photo of the second flag raising on Mount Suribachi the afternoon of February 23, Lowery's photos taken on Mount Suribachi were not released until 1947, when 16 of his pictures appeared in Leatherneck Magazine.

== Death ==
Jacobs died of natural causes at a hospital in Redding, California, on January 29, 2008, at the age of 82.

== Military awards ==
Jacobs's military awards:

Purple Heart		Combat Action Ribbon
Presidential Unit Citation	Good Conduct Medal	American Campaign Medal
Asiatic-Pacific Campaign Medal with 1 bronze star	World War II Victory Medal	National Defense Service Medal

== See also ==
- Raising the Flag on Iwo Jima
- Battle of Iwo Jima
- Marine Corps War Memorial
