= Marine Corps 230th Anniversary silver dollar =

2005 Commemorative dollar for the US Marine Corps

Dollar
- United States
- Value: 1 U.S. Dollar
- Mass: 26.73 g
- Diameter: 38.10 mm
- Thickness: 2.77 mm (0.109 in)
- Edge: reeded
- Composition: 90% Ag; 10% Cu
- Years of minting: 2005
- Catalog number: KM# 376

Obverse
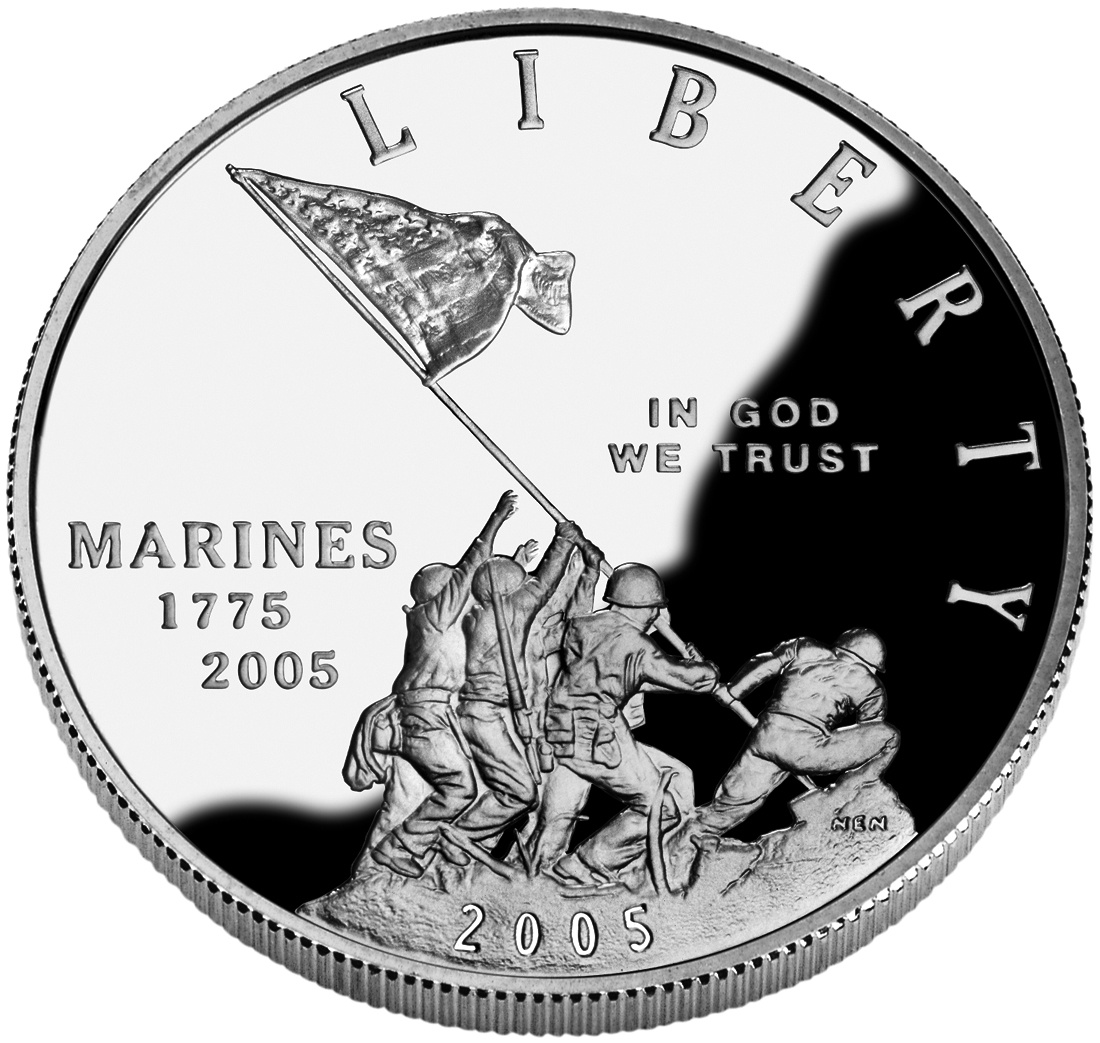
- Design: Historic flag raising on Iwo Jima, Inscriptions: "Marines," "1775," "2005," "In God We Trust," "Liberty."
- Designer: Norman E. Nemeth
- Design date: 2004

Reverse
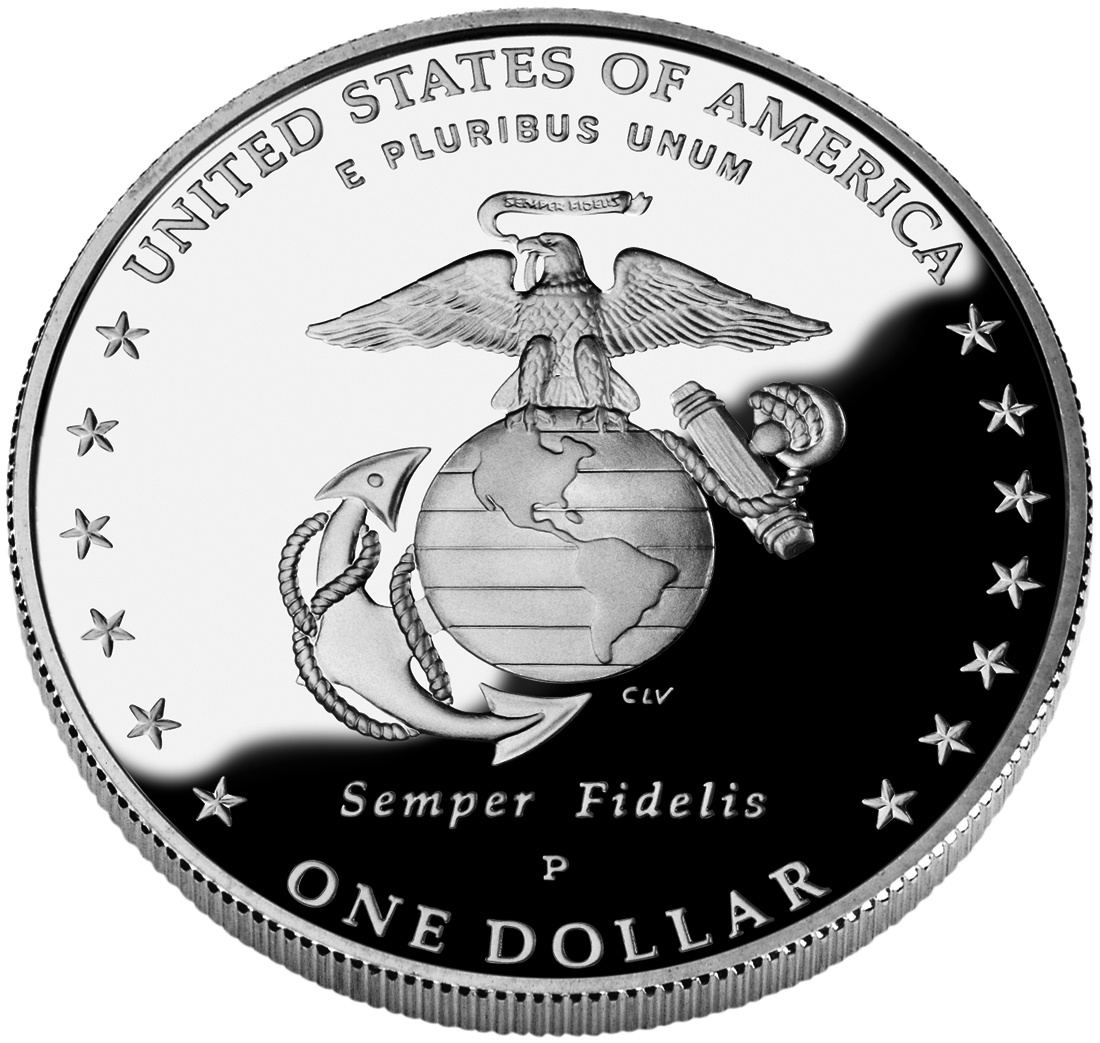
- Design: Eagle, Globe and Anchor — the Marine Corps Emblem, thirteen stars. Inscriptions — "Semper Fidelis" (the Marine Corps Motto), "United States of America," "E Pluribus Unum," "One Dollar."
- Designer: Charles L. Vickers
- Design date: 2004

In 2005, the United States Mint released a silver dollar commemorative coin in honor of the 230th birthday of the United States Marine Corps.

The coin was sold as both as a proof coin and an uncirculated coin, for a total number of 600,000 coins. They became available to order on July 20, 2005, and by September 21, 2005, all coins had been purchased.

This was the first time the United States released a coin to represent a branch of its military.

== Specifications ==
The coin features one of the most recognizable scenes of Marine Corps history, Raising the Flag on Iwo Jima. Additionally, the Marine Corps official emblem, the Eagle, Globe, and Anchor is on the reverse.

Mintage (max.): 600,000 Based on independent market research provided by the recipient organization (the Marine Corps Heritage Foundation), the Secretary exercised his authority (for the first time) to increase the legislated maximum mintage (500,000) to 600,000.

U.S. Mint Facility: Philadelphia

Public Law: 108-291
