= Raising the Flag on Iwo Jima =

1945 photograph by Joe Rosenthal

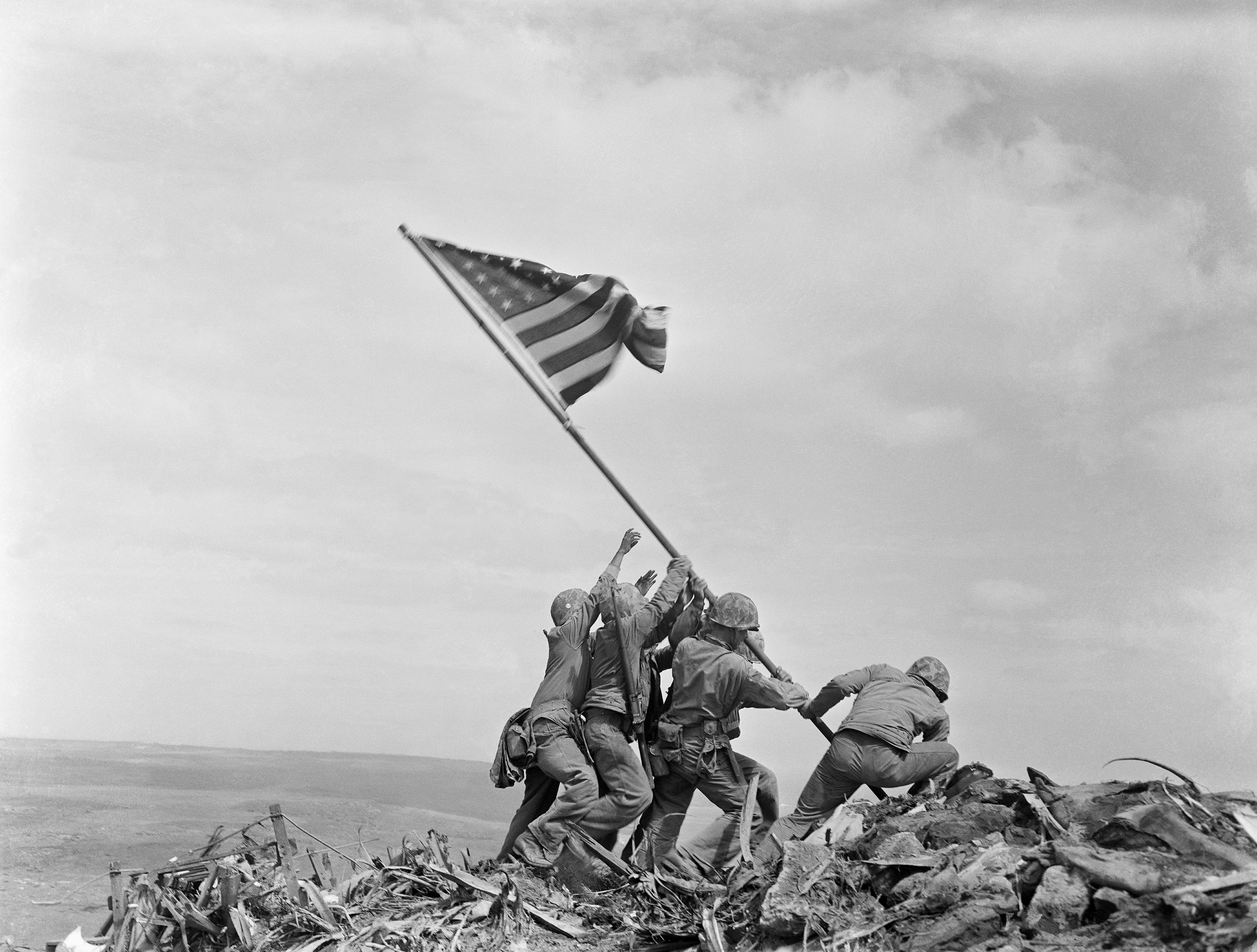
Raising the Flag on Iwo Jima, by Joe Rosenthal of the Associated Press

Raising the Flag on Iwo Jima (Japanese: 硫黄島の星条旗, Hepburn: Iōjima no Seijōki; lit. "The Stars and Stripes on Iwo Jima") is an iconic photograph of six United States Marines raising the U.S. flag atop Mount Suribachi during the Battle of Iwo Jima in the final stages of the Pacific War. Taken by Joe Rosenthal of the Associated Press on February 23, 1945, the photograph was published in Sunday newspapers two days later and reprinted in thousands of publications. It won the 1945 Pulitzer Prize for Photography and has come to be regarded in the United States as one of the most recognizable images of World War II.

The iconic flag raising, by the six serving in the 5th Marine Division, occurred in the early afternoon, after the mountaintop had been captured and a smaller flag had been raised that morning. Three of the six Marines in the photograph—Sergeant Michael Strank, Corporal Harlon Block, and Private First Class Franklin Sousley—would be killed in action during the battle; Block was identified as Sergeant Hank Hansen until January 1947. The other three Marines in the photograph were Corporals (then Privates First Class) Ira Hayes, Harold Schultz, and Harold Keller; Schultz was identified as PhM2c. John Bradley, USN, until June 2016 and Keller was identified as Rene Gagnon until October 2019.

The photograph was the model for the Marine Corps War Memorial, dedicated in 1954 to honor all U.S. Marines who died in service since 1775. The memorial, sculpted by Felix de Weldon, is located in Arlington Ridge Park, near the Ord-Weitzel Gate to Arlington National Cemetery and the Netherlands Carillon.

== Background ==
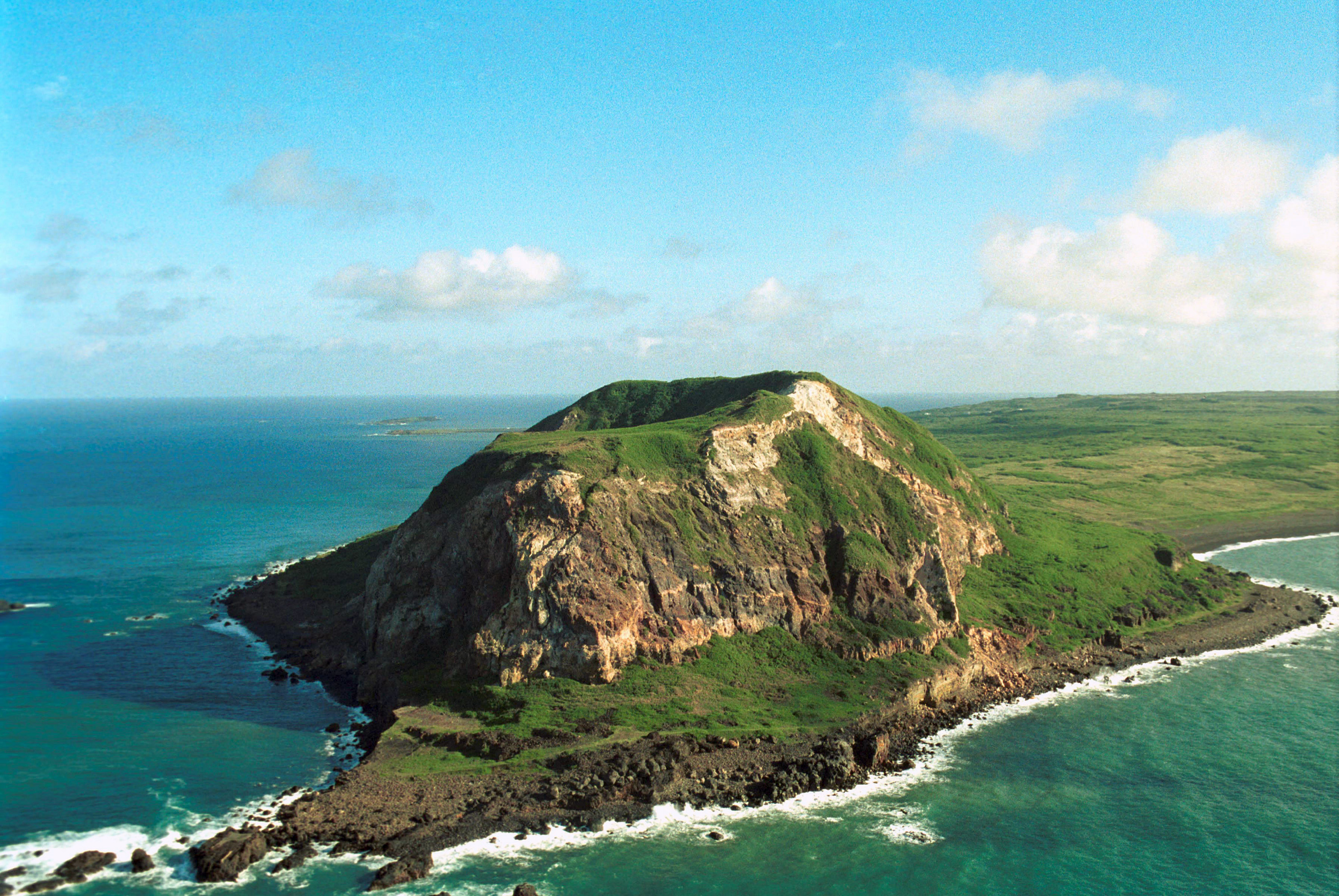
Mount Suribachi (pictured in 2001) is the dominant geographical feature of the island of Iwo Jima.

On February 19, 1945, the United States invaded Iwo Jima as part of its island-hopping strategy to defeat Japan. Iwo Jima originally was not a target, but the relatively quick liberation of the Philippines left the Americans with a longer-than-expected lull before the planned invasion of Okinawa. The capture of Iwo Jima would serve two purposes: to deprive the Japanese of an early warning station that could alert their homeland of American bombers flying from the Mariana Islands , and to enable the creation of an emergency landing strip for damaged bombers.

The Japanese were determined to hold the island, both for its tactical value and because it is politically part of the prefecture of Tokyo and therefore would be the first Japanese homeland soil to be captured by the Americans. The island was therefore heavily fortified and ferociously defended.

The island is dominated by Mount Suribachi, a 546-foot (166 m) dormant volcanic cone at the southern tip of the island. Tactically, the top of Suribachi was one of the most important locations on the island. The Japanese defenders used it to spot artillery accurately onto the Americans, particularly on the landing beaches. The American invasion plan called for isolating and capturing Suribachi first, a goal that was achieved on February 23, four days into the battle. But the battle continued to rage; the island was declared "secure" 31 days later, on March 26, 1945.

== Two flag-raisings ==
There were two American flags raised on top of Mount Suribachi, on February 23, 1945. The photograph Rosenthal took was actually of the second flag-raising, in which a larger replacement flag was raised by different Marines than those who raised the first flag.

Flag raiser IDs
First photo	Second photo (Initial ID)	Second photo (Final ID)
Harold Schrier	Hank Hansen†	Harlon Block†
Raymond Jacobs	Rene Gagnon	Harold Keller
Hank Hansen†	John "Doc" Bradley	Franklin Sousley†
Ernest Thomas†	Michael Strank†	Michael Strank†
Phil Ward	Franklin Sousley†	Harold Schultz
John "Doc" Bradley	Ira Hayes	Ira Hayes
James Michels		
Chuck Lindberg		

† Died in combat on Iwo Jima.

=== Raising the first flag ===
A U.S. flag was first raised atop Mount Suribachi soon after the mountaintop was captured at around 10:30 a.m. on February 23, 1945.

Official 48-star flag in 1945

Lieutenant Colonel Chandler W. Johnson, commander of the 2nd Battalion, 28th Marine Regiment, 5th Marine Division, ordered Marine Captain Dave Severance, commander of Easy Company, 2nd Battalion, 28th Marines, to send a platoon to seize and occupy the crest of Mount Suribachi. First Lieutenant Harold G. Schrier, executive officer of Easy Company, who had replaced the wounded Third Platoon commander, John Keith Wells, volunteered to lead a 40-man combat patrol up the mountain. Lieutenant Colonel Johnson (or 1st Lieutenant Greeley Wells, the battalion adjutant, whose job it was to carry the flag) had taken the 54-by-28-inch (137 cm × 71 cm) flag from the battalion's transport ship, USS Missoula, and handed the flag to Schrier. Johnson said to Schrier, "If you get to the top, put it up." Schrier assembled the patrol at 8 a.m. to begin the climb up the mountain.

Despite the large numbers of Japanese troops in the vicinity, Schrier's patrol made it to the rim of the crater at about 10:15 a.m., having come under little or no enemy fire, as the Japanese were being bombarded at the time. The flag was attached by Schrier and two Marines to a Japanese iron water pipe found on top, and the flagstaff was raised and planted by Schrier, assisted by Platoon Sergeant Ernest Thomas and Sergeant Oliver Hansen (the platoon guide) at about 10:30 a.m. (On February 25, during a CBS press interview aboard the flagship USS Eldorado about the flag-raising, Thomas stated that he, Schrier, and Hansen had actually raised the flag.) The raising of the national colors immediately caused a loud cheering reaction from the Marines, sailors, and coast guardsmen on the beach below and from the men on the ships near the beach. The loud noise made by the servicemen and blasts of the ship horns alerted the Japanese, who up to this point had stayed in their cave bunkers. Schrier and his men near the flagstaff then came under fire from Japanese troops, but the Marines quickly eliminated the threat. Schrier was later awarded the Navy Cross for volunteering to take the patrol up Mount Suribachi and raising the U.S. flag, and a Silver Star Medal for a heroic action in March while in command of D Company, 2/28 Marines on Iwo Jima.

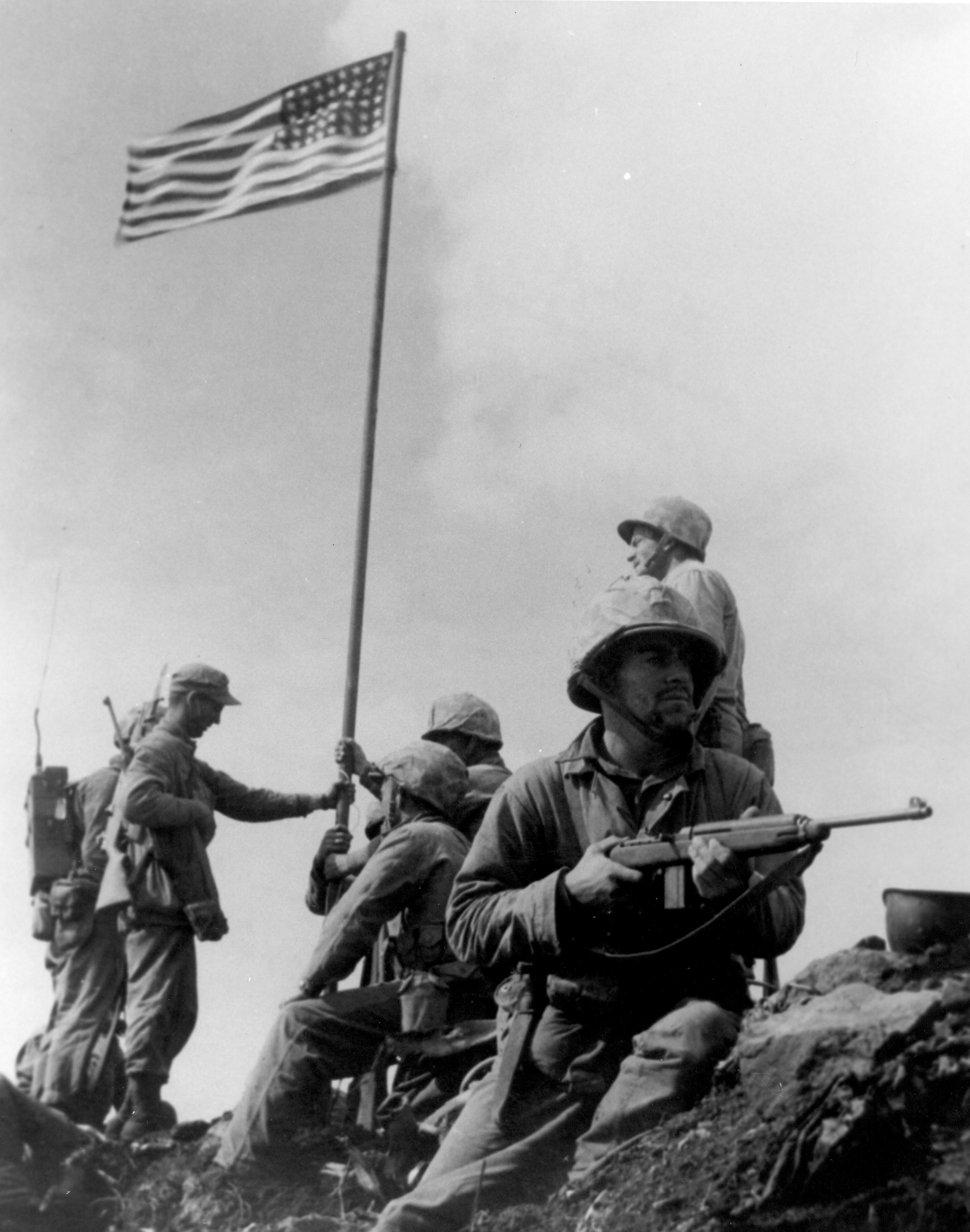
Raising the First Flag on Iwo Jima by SSgt. Louis R. Lowery, USMC, is the most widely circulated photograph of the first flag flown on Mt. Suribachi. Left to right: 1st Lt. Harold Schrier (kneeling behind radioman's legs), Pfc. Raymond Jacobs (radioman reassigned from F Company), Sgt. Henry "Hank" Hansen wearing cap, holding flagstaff with left hand), Platoon Sgt. Ernest "Boots" Thomas (seated), Pvt. Phil Ward (holding lower flagstaff with his right hand), PhM2c. John Bradley, USN (holding flagstaff with both hands, his right hand above Ward's right hand and his left hand below.), Pfc. James Michels (holding M1 Carbine), and Cpl. Charles W. Lindberg (standing above Michels).

Photographs of the first flag flown on Mount Suribachi were taken by Staff Sergeant Louis R. Lowery of Leatherneck magazine, who accompanied the patrol up the mountain, and other photographers afterwards. Others involved with the first flag-raising include Corporal Charles W. Lindberg (who also helped raise the flag), Privates First Class James Michels, Harold Schultz, Raymond Jacobs (F Company radioman), Private Phil Ward, and Navy corpsman John Bradley. This flag was too small, however, to be easily seen from the northern side of Mount Suribachi, where heavy fighting would go on for several more days.

The Secretary of the Navy, James Forrestal, had decided the previous night that he wanted to go ashore and witness the final stage of the fight for the mountain. Now, under a stern commitment to take orders from General Holland "Howlin' Mad" Smith, the secretary was churning ashore in the company of the blunt, earthy general. Their boat touched the beach just after the flag went up, and the mood among the high command turned jubilant. Gazing upward, at the red, white, and blue speck, Forrestal remarked to Smith: "Holland, the raising of that flag on Suribachi means a Marine Corps for the next five hundred years".

Forrestal was so taken with fervor of the moment that he decided he wanted the Second Battalion's flag flying on Mt. Suribachi as a souvenir. The news of this wish did not sit well with 2nd Battalion Commander Chandler Johnson, whose temperament was every bit as fiery as Howlin Mad's. "To hell with that!" the colonel spat when the message reached him. The flag belonged to the battalion, as far as Johnson was concerned. He decided to secure it as soon as possible, and dispatched his assistant operations officer, Lieutenant Ted Tuttle, to the beach to obtain a replacement flag. As an afterthought, Johnson called after Tuttle: "And make it a bigger one."

=== Raising the second flag ===
The photograph taken by Rosenthal was the second flag-raising on top of Mount Suribachi, on February 23, 1945.

Sgt. Genaust's film shot of the second flag-raising, excerpted from the 1945 Carriers Hit Tokyo newsreel

On orders from Colonel Chandler Johnson—passed on by Easy Company's commander, Captain Dave Severance—Sergeant Michael Strank, one of Second Platoon's squad leaders, was to take three members of his rifle squad (Corporal Harlon H. Block and Privates First Class Franklin R. Sousley and Ira H. Hayes) and climb up Mount Suribachi to raise a replacement flag on top; the three took supplies or laid telephone wire on the way to the top. Severance also dispatched Private First Class Rene A. Gagnon, the battalion runner (messenger) for Easy Company, to the command post for fresh SCR-300 walkie-talkie batteries to be taken to the top.

Meanwhile, Lieutenant Albert Theodore Tuttle under Johnson's orders, had found a large (96-by-56–inch) flag in nearby Tank Landing Ship USS LST-779. He made his way back to the command post and gave it to Johnson. Johnson, in turn, gave it to Rene Gagnon, with orders to take it up to Schrier on Mount Suribachi and raise it. The official Marine Corps history of the event is that Tuttle received the flag from Navy Ensign Alan Wood of USS LST-779, who in turn had received the flag from a supply depot in Pearl Harbor. Severance had confirmed that the second larger flag was in fact provided by Alan Wood even though Wood could not recognize any of the pictures of the second flag's raisers as Gagnon. The flag was sewn by Mabel Sauvageau, a worker at the "flag loft" of the Mare Island Naval Shipyard.

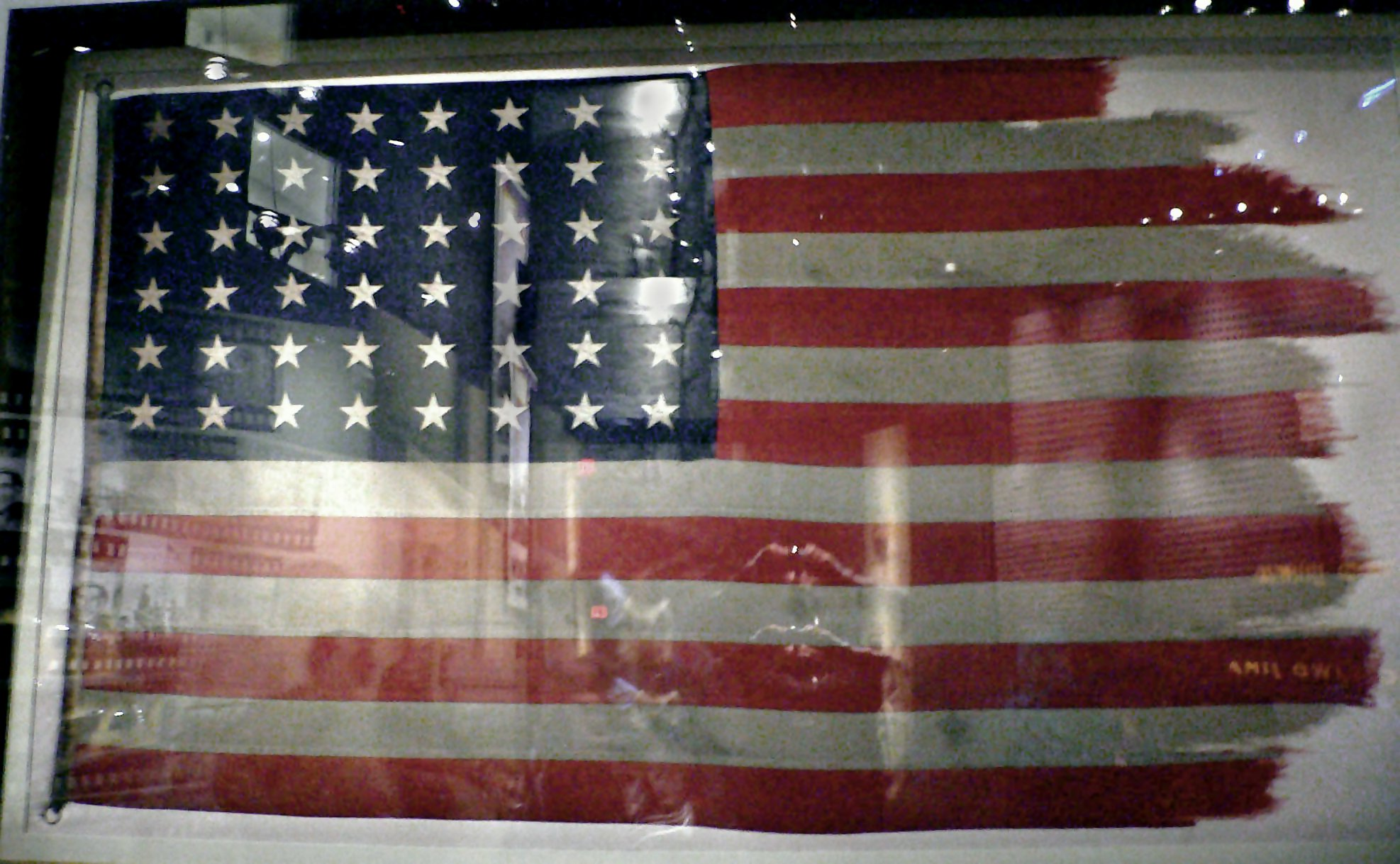
The flags from the first and second flag-raisings are preserved in the National Museum of the Marine Corps in Triangle, Virginia. The second flag, pictured here, was damaged by the high winds at the peak of Suribachi.

First Lieutenant Greeley Wells, who had been the Second Battalion, 28th Marines adjutant officially in charge of the two American flags flown on Mount Suribachi, stated in The New York Times in 1991 that Lieutenant Colonel Johnson ordered Wells to get the second flag, and that Wells sent Rene Gagnon, his battalion runner, to the ships on shore for the flag. Wells said that Gagnon returned with a flag and gave it to him, and that Gagnon took this flag up Mt. Suribachi with a message for Schrier to raise it and send the other flag down with Gagnon. Wells stated that he received the first flag back from Gagnon and secured it at the Marine headquarters command post. Wells also stated that he had handed the first flag to Lieutenant Schrier to take up Mount Suribachi.

The Coast Guard Historian's Office recognizes the claims made by former U.S. Coast Guardsman Quartermaster Robert Resnick, who served aboard the USS Duval County at Iwo Jima. "Before he died in November 2004, Resnick said Gagnon came aboard LST-758 the morning of February 23 looking for a flag. Resnick said he grabbed a flag from a bunting box and asked permission from his ship's commanding officer Lt. Felix Molenda to donate it. Resnick kept quiet about his participation until 2001."

==== Rosenthal's photograph ====
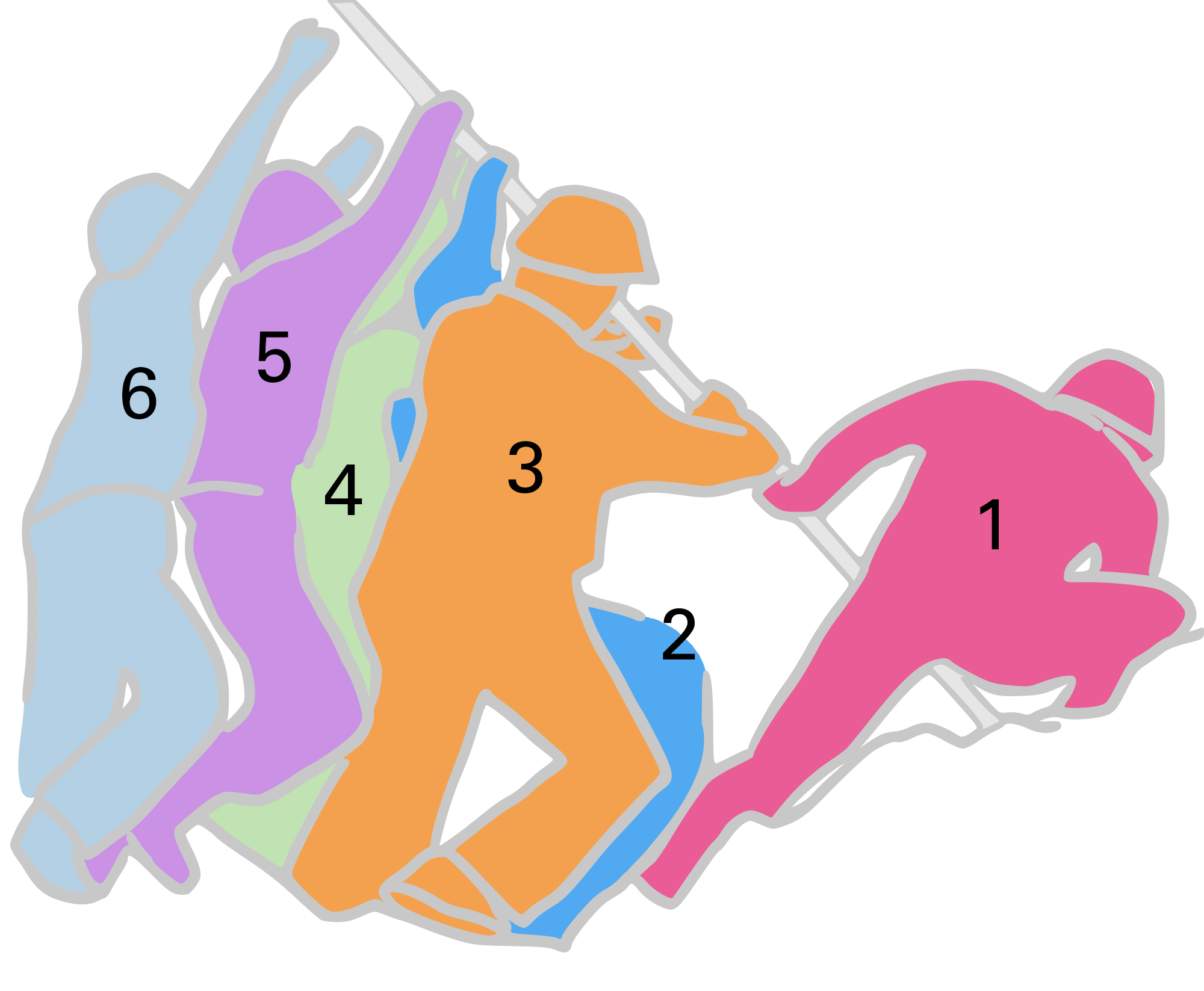
The six second flag-raisers: #1, Cpl. Harlon Block (KIA) #2, Pfc. Harold Keller #3, Pfc. Franklin Sousley (KIA) #4, Sgt. Michael Strank (KIA) #5, Pfc. Harold Schultz #6, Pfc. Ira Hayes

Gagnon, Strank, and Strank's three Marines reached the top of the mountain around noon without being fired upon. Rosenthal, along with Marine photographers Sergeant Bill Genaust (who was killed in action after the flag-raising) and Private First Class Bob Campbell were climbing Suribachi at this time. On the way up, the trio met Lowery, who had photographed the first flag-raising, coming down. They considered turning around, but Lowery told them that the summit was an excellent vantage point from which to take photographs. The three photographers reached the summit as the Marines were attaching the flag to an old Japanese water pipe.

Rosenthal put his Speed Graphic camera on the ground (set to 1/400 sec shutter speed, with the f-stop between 8 and 11 and Agfa film) so he could pile rocks to stand on for a better vantage point. In doing so, he nearly missed the shot. The Marines began raising the flag. Realizing he was about to miss the action, Rosenthal quickly swung his camera up and snapped the photograph without using the viewfinder. Ten years after the flag-raising, Rosenthal wrote:

Out of the corner of my eye, I had seen the men start the flag up. I swung my camera and shot the scene. That is how the picture was taken, and when you take a picture like that, you don't come away saying you got a great shot. You don't know.

Sergeant Genaust, who stood just about three feet away from photographer Rosenthal, was shooting motion-picture film during the second flag-raising. His footage captured the second event at an almost-identical angle to Rosenthal's iconic photograph.

The six men who raised the second flag were: Ira Hayes, Harold Schultz (correctly identified in June 2016, previously identified as Navy corpman John Bradley), Michael Strank, Franklin Sousley, Harold Keller (correctly identified in 2019, previously identified as Marine corporal Rene Gagnon), and Harlon Block. Of these six, only Hayes, Keller, and Schultz survived the battle; all three would further survive the war. Strank and Block were both killed on March 1, just six days after the flag-raising—Strank by shellfire (possibly friendly fire from an American destroyer), and Block by a mortar round a few hours later. Franklin Sousley was killed by a Japanese sniper on March 21, just days before the island was officially secured.

== Publication and staging confusion ==
After the flag-raising, Rosenthal sent his film to Guam to be developed and printed. George Tjaden of Hendricks, Minnesota, was likely the technician who printed it. Upon seeing it, Associated Press (AP) photograph editor John Bodkin exclaimed, "Here's one for all time!" and immediately transmitted the image to the AP headquarters in New York City at 7 am, Eastern War Time. The photograph was quickly picked up off the wire by hundreds of newspapers. It "was distributed by Associated Press within seventeen and one-half hours after Rosenthal shot it—an astonishingly fast turnaround time in those days."

A moment's misunderstanding led to a persistent misconception that the photograph had been staged. After the second flag-raising, Rosenthal had the Marines of Easy Company pose for a group shot, the "gung-ho" shot. A few days later, Rosenthal—back on Guam—was asked if he had posed "the photograph". Thinking the questioner was referring to the 'gung-ho' photograph, he replied "Sure." After that, Robert Sherrod, a Time-Life correspondent, told his editors in New York that Rosenthal had staged the flag-raising photograph. Time's radio show, Time Views the News, said, "Rosenthal climbed Suribachi after the flag had already been planted....Like most photographers [he] could not resist reposing his characters in historic fashion." As a result, Rosenthal was accused of staging the photograph or covering up the first flag-raising. One New York Times book reviewer suggested revoking his Pulitzer Prize. The misperception persisted for decades, despite Genaust's movie film that showed Rosenthal snapping his still camera as the flag was raised. Rosenthal repeatedly and vociferously denied the claims. "I don't think it is in me to do much more of this sort of thing," he said in 1995. "I don't know how to get across to anybody what 50 years of constant repetition means".

== Incorrect identifications ==
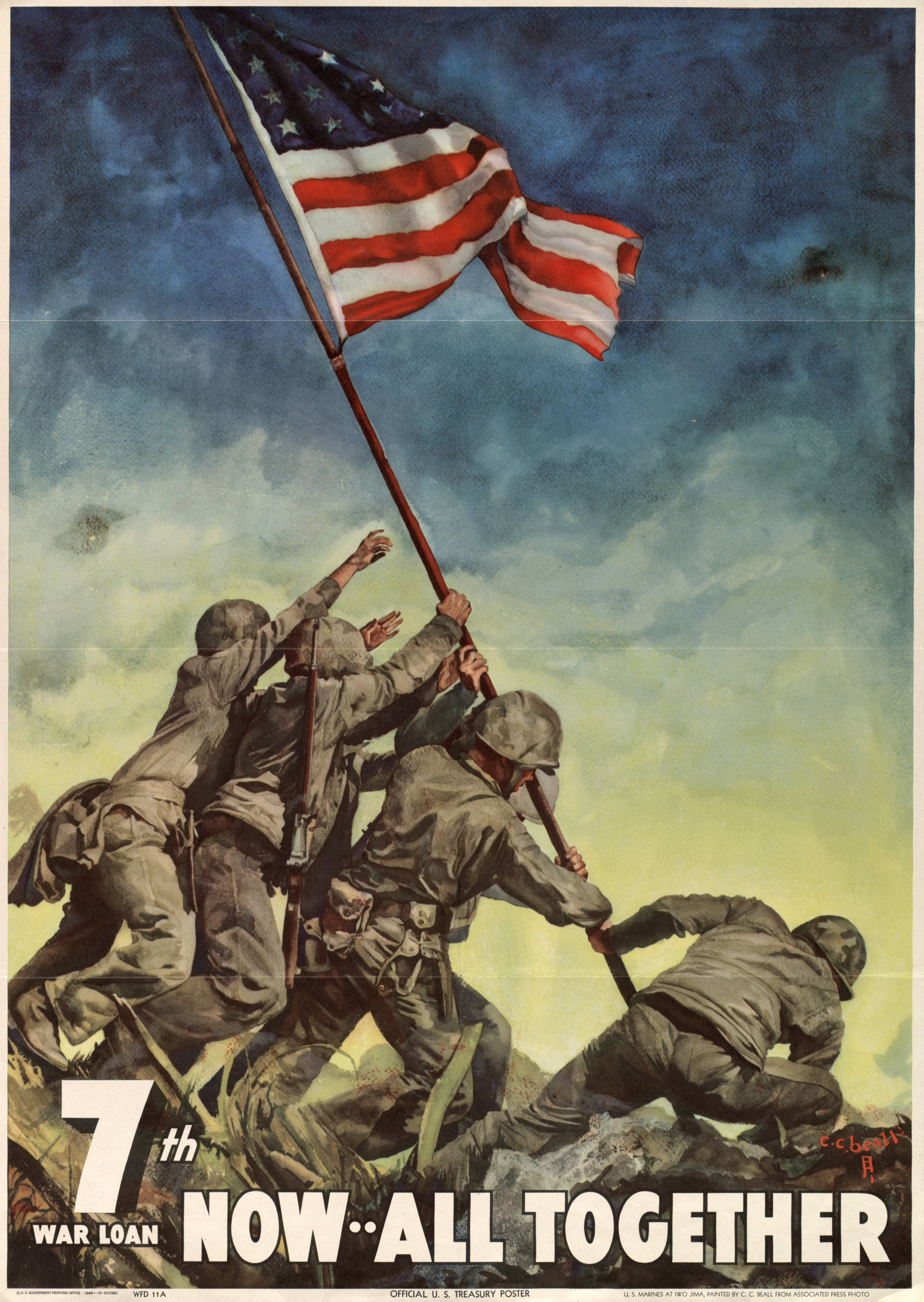
C. C. Beall's poster for the Seventh War Loan Drive

President Franklin D. Roosevelt, upon seeing Rosenthal's flag-raising photograph, saw its potential to use for the upcoming Seventh War Loan Drive to help fund the war effort. He then ordered the flag-raisers to be identified and sent to Washington, D.C. after the fighting on the island ended (March 26, 1945).

Rosenthal did not take the names of those in the photograph. On April 7, Rene Gagnon was the first of the second "flag-raisers" to arrive in Washington, D.C. Using an enlargement of the photograph that did not show the faces of the flag-raisers, he named himself, Henry Hansen, Franklin Sousley, John Bradley and Michael Strank, as being in the photograph. He initially refused to name Ira Hayes, as Hayes did not want the publicity and threatened him with physical harm. However, upon being summoned to Marine headquarters and told that refusal to name the last flag-raiser was a serious crime, he identified the sixth flag-raiser as Hayes.

President Roosevelt died on April 12, 1945. On April 19, Bradley (then on crutches) and Hayes arrived in Washington, D.C. On April 20, the three surviving second flag-raisers, identified then as Gagnon, Bradley, and Hayes, met President Truman in the White House. On May 9, during a ceremony at the nation's capitol, the three men raised the original second flag to initiate the bond tour which began on May 11 in New York City. On May 24, Hayes was taken off the tour due to problems caused by drinking alcohol and ordered back to his regiment which had returned to Hawaii. Gagnon and Bradley completed the tour which ended on July 4 in Washington, D.C. The bond drive was a success, raising $26.3 billion, twice the tour's goal.

=== Harlon Block and Henry Hansen ===
Gagnon misidentified Corporal Harlon Block as Sergeant Henry O. "Hank" Hansen in Rosenthal's photo (both were killed in action on March 1). Initially, Bradley concurred with all of Gagnon's identifications. On April 8, 1945, the Marine Corps released the identification of five of the six flag raisers, including Hansen rather than Block (Sousley's identity was temporarily withheld pending notification of his family of his death during the battle). Block's mother, Belle Block, refused to accept the official identification, noting that she had "changed so many diapers on that boy's butt, I know it's my boy." When Hayes was interviewed about the identities of the flag raisers and shown a photo of the flag raising by a Marine public relations officer on April 19, he told the officer that it was definitely Harlon Block and not Hansen at the base of the flagpole. The lieutenant colonel then told Hayes that the identifications had already been officially released, and ordered Hayes to keep silent about it (during the investigation, the colonel denied Hayes told him about Block). Block, Sousley, and Hayes were close friends in the same squad of Second Platoon, E Company, while Hansen, who helped raise the first flag, was a member of Third Platoon, E Company.

In 1946, Hayes hitchhiked to Texas and informed Block's parents that their son had, in fact, been one of the six flag raisers. Block's mother, Belle, immediately sent the letter that Hayes had given her to her congressional representative Milton West. West, in turn, forwarded the letter to Marine Corps Commandant Alexander Vandegrift, who ordered an investigation. John Bradley (formerly in Third Platoon with Hansen), upon being shown the evidence (Hansen, a former Paramarine, wore his large parachutist boots in an exposed manner on Iwo Jima), agreed that it was probably Block and not Hansen. In January 1947, the Marine Corps officially announced it was Block in the photograph and not Hansen at the base of the flagpole. Hayes also was named as being in the far left position of the flag raisers, replacing the position Sousley was determined to have had up until then; Sousley was now in back of and to the right of Strank (in 2016, Harold Schultz was named in this position and Sousley was named in the position where Bradley was named).

Ira remembered what Rene Gagnon and John Bradley could not have remembered, because they did not join the little cluster until the last moment: that it was Harlon [Block], Mike [Strank], Franklin [Sousley] and [Hayes] who had ascended Suribachi midmorning to lay telephone wire; it was Rene [Gagnon] who had come along with the replacement flag. Hansen had not been part of this action.

=== Harold H. Schultz and John Bradley ===
On June 23, 2016, the Marine Corps publicly announced that Marine Corporal (then Private First Class) Harold Schultz was one of the flag-raisers and Navy corpsman John Bradley was not one of the flag-raisers in Rosenthal's second flag-raising photograph. Harold Schultz was identified as being in Franklin Sousley's position to the right and in front of Ira Hayes, and Sousley was identified as being in Bradley's position to the right and behind Rene Gagnon (identified as Harold Keller in 2019) behind Harlon Block at the base of the flagpole. Bradley and Schultz had been present when both flags were actually raised, while Sousley was only on Mount Suribachi when he helped raise the second flag. Schultz was also part of the group of Marines and corpsmen who posed for Rosenthal's second "gung ho" photo.

Bradley, who died in 1994, seldom did an interview about the famous second flag-raising, occasionally deflecting questions by claiming he had forgotten. He changed his story numerous times, saying that he raised or pitched in to raise the flag, and also that he was on, and not on, Mount Suribachi when the first flag was raised. Within his family, it was considered a taboo subject, and when they received calls or invitations to speak on certain holidays, they were told to say he was away fishing at his cottage. At the time of Bradley's death, his son James said that he knew almost nothing about his father's wartime experiences. James Bradley spent four years interviewing and researching the topic and published a nonfiction book entitled Flags of Our Fathers (2000) about the flag-raising and its participants. The book, which was a bestseller, was later adapted into a 2006 film of the same name, directed by Clint Eastwood.

After being honorably discharged, Schultz moved to California and made his career with the United States Postal Service. He died in 1995.

The possibility that any flag-raiser had been misidentified was publicly raised for the first time in November 2014 by Eric Krelle, an amateur historian and collector of World War II-era Marine Corps memorabilia, and an Irish citizen and amateur historian named Stephen Foley. Studying other photographs taken that day and video footage, Krelle and Foley argued that Franklin Sousley was in the fourth position (left to right) instead of Bradley and Harold Schultz of Los Angeles (originally from Detroit) was in the second position, previously identified as Sousley. Initially, Marine Corps historians and officials did not accept those findings, but began their own investigation. On June 23, 2016, they confirmed Krelle's and Foley's findings, stating that Schultz was in Sousley's place, Sousley was standing next to Block, and that Bradley was not in the photo at all. James Bradley has also changed his mind, stating that he no longer believes his father is depicted in the famous photograph.

=== Harold Keller and Rene Gagnon ===
On October 16, 2019, the Marine Corps announced that Marine Corporal Harold Keller was the flag-raiser previously identified as Rene Gagnon in Rosenthal's photograph. Stephen Foley, filmmaker Dustin Spence, and Brent Westemeyer were key to this revised identification. Photos and video footage showed that the man thought to have been Gagnon had a wedding ring, which matched Keller, who had married in 1944 (Gagnon was not married at the time). The man also did not have a facial mole, as Gagnon did. Finally, a photo which captured the lowering of the first flag verified what Gagnon had looked like that day, which did not match the second man in the Rosenthal photo. After the battle, Keller returned to his hometown of Brooklyn, Iowa, where he died in 1979.

== Legacy ==
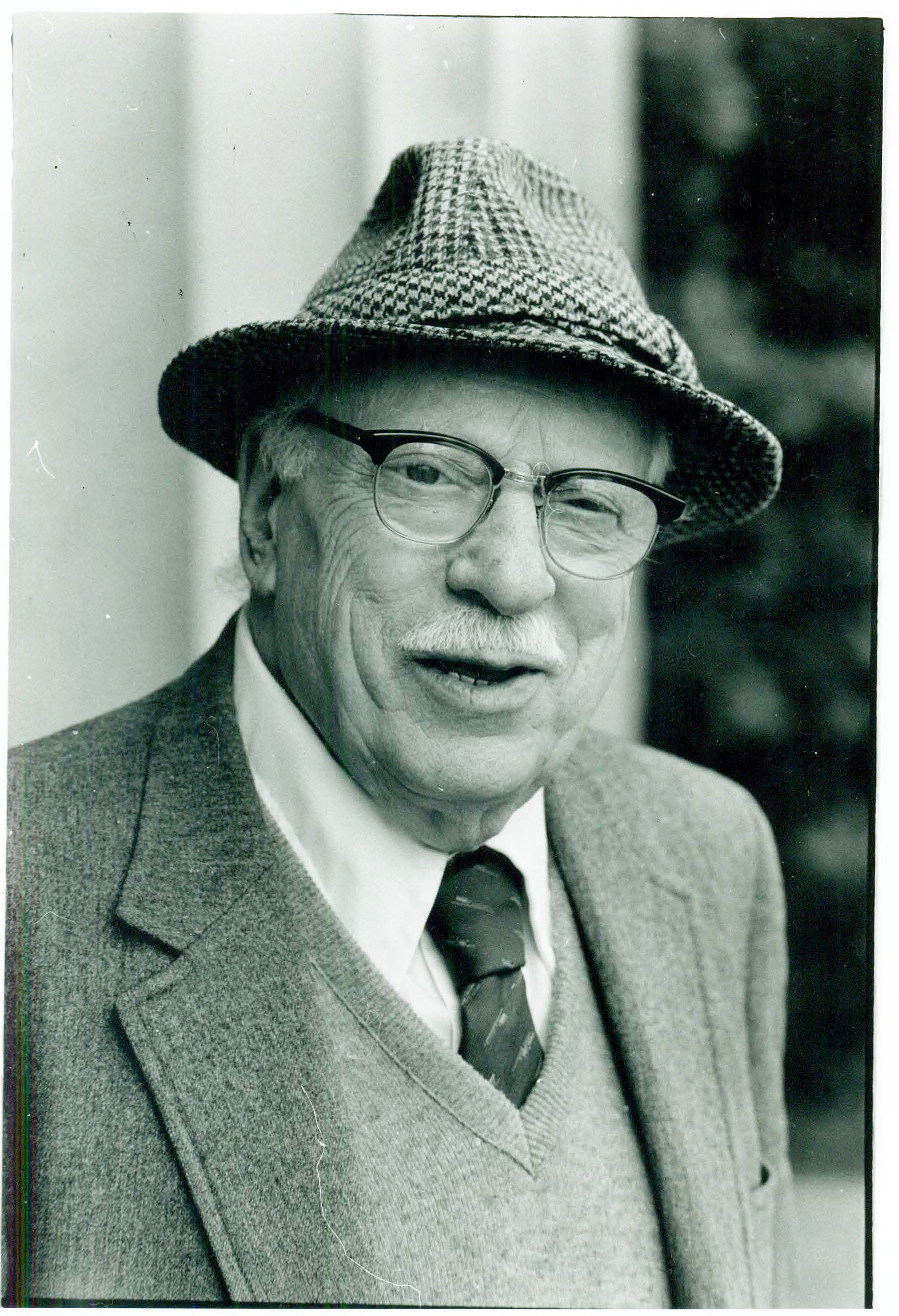
Joe Rosenthal in 1990

Rosenthal's photograph was used as the basis for C. C. Beall's poster Now... All Together for the Seventh War Loan Drive (14 May - 30 June 1945).

Rosenthal's photograph won the 1945 Pulitzer Prize for Photography, the only photograph to win the prize in the same year it was taken.

News pros were not the only ones greatly impressed by the photo. Navy Captain T.B. Clark was on duty at Patuxent Air Station in Maryland that Saturday when it came humming off the wire in 1945. He studied it for a minute, and then thrust it under the gaze of Navy Petty Officer Felix de Weldon. De Weldon was an Austrian immigrant schooled in European painting and sculpture. De Weldon could not take his eyes off the photo. In its classic triangular lines he recognized similarities with the ancient statues he had studied. He reflexively reached for some sculptor's clay and tools. With the photograph before him he labored through the night. Within 72 hours of the photo's release, he had replicated the six boys pushing a pole, raising a flag.

Upon seeing the finished model, the Marine Corps commandant had de Weldon assigned to the Marine Corps until de Weldon was discharged from the Navy after the war was over.

Starting in 1951, de Weldon was commissioned to design a memorial to the Marine Corps. It took de Weldon and hundreds of his assistants three years to finish it. Hayes, Gagnon, and Bradley posed for de Weldon, who used their faces as a model. The three Marine flag raisers who did not survive the battle were sculpted from photographs.

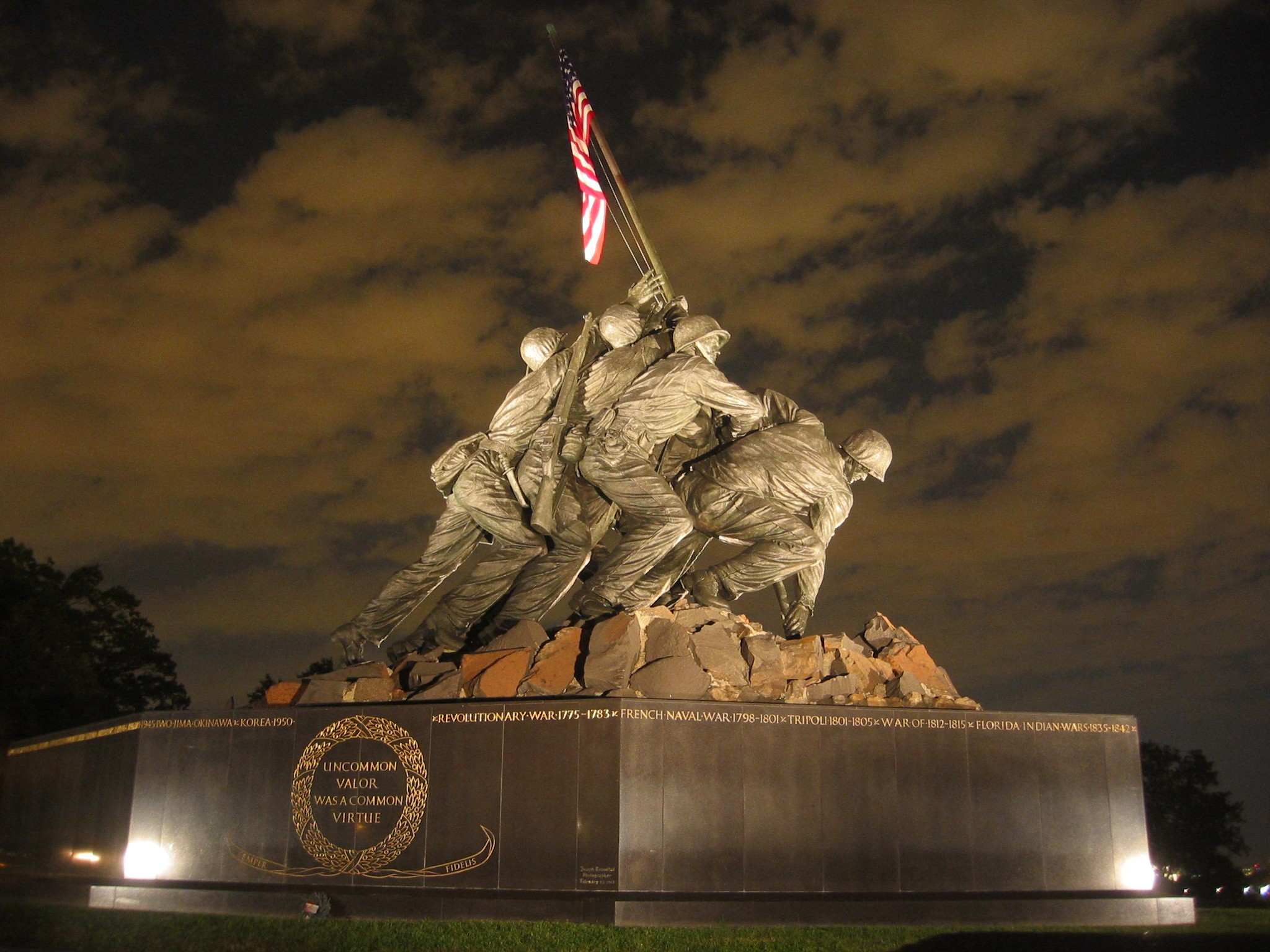
The U.S. Marine Corps War Memorial in Arlington, Virginia

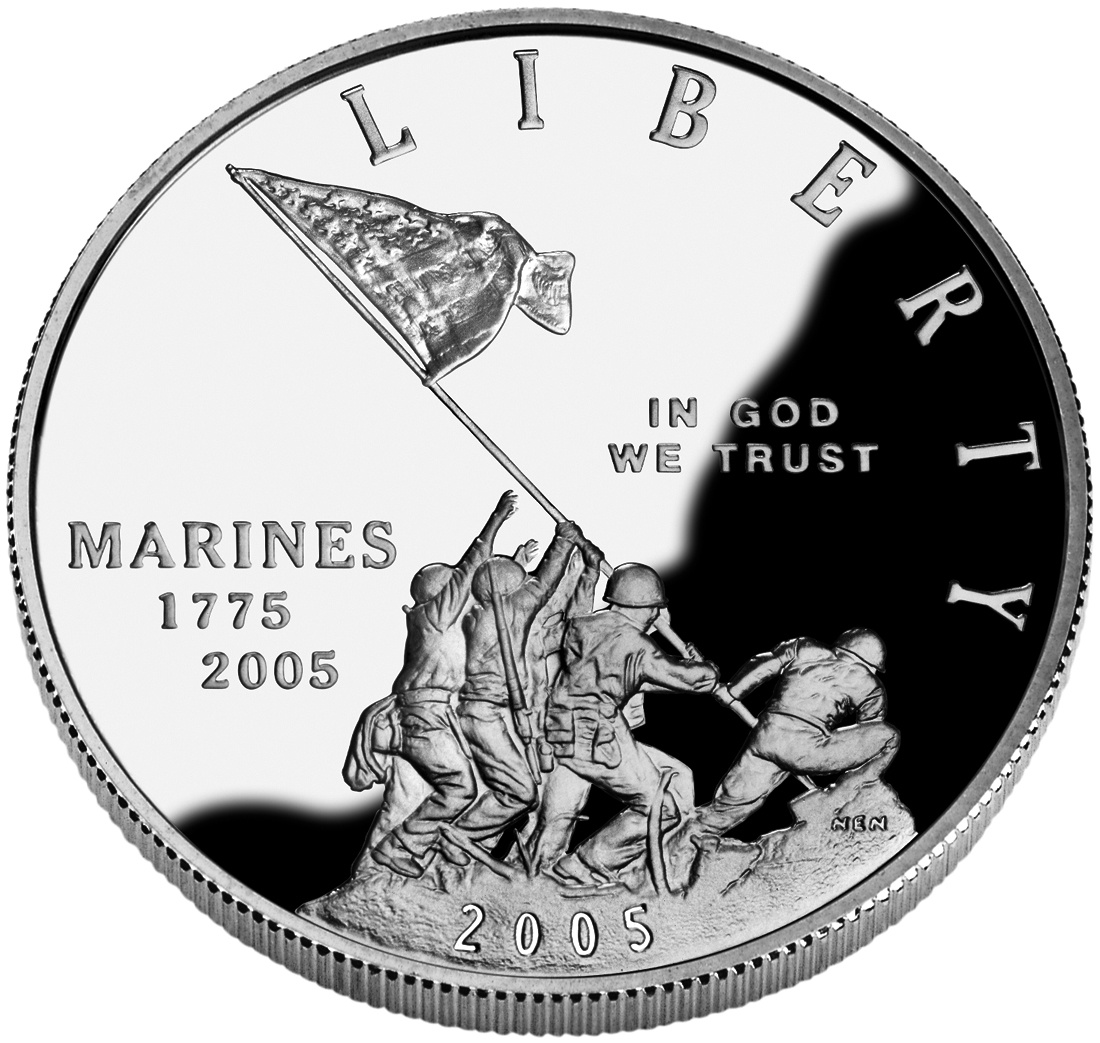
The obverse of the 2005 Marine Corps 230th Anniversary silver dollar

The flag-raising Rosenthal (and Genaust) photographed was the replacement flag/flagstaff for the first flag/flagstaff that was raised on Mount Suribachi on February 23, 1945. There was some resentment from Marines of the original 40-man patrol that went up Mount Suribachi, including those involved with the first flag-raising, that they did not receive their deserved recognition. These included Staff Sgt. Lou Lowery, who took the first photos of the first flag flying over Mt. Suribachi; Charles W. Lindberg, who helped tie the first American flag to the first flagpole on Mount Suribachi (and who was, until his death in June 2007, one of the last living persons depicted in either flag-flying scene), who complained for several years that he helped to raise the flag and "was called a liar and everything else. It was terrible" (because of all the recognition and publicity directed to the replacement flag-raisers and that flag-raising); and Raymond Jacobs, photographed with the patrol commander around the base of the first flag flying over Mt. Suribachi, who complained until he died in 2008 that he was still not recognized by the Marine Corps by name as being the radioman in the photo.

The original Rosenthal photograph is in the possession of Roy H. Williams, who bought it from the estate of John Faber, the official historian for the National Press Photographers Association, who had received it from Rosenthal. Both flags (from the first and second flag-raisings) are located in the National Museum of the Marine Corps in Quantico, Virginia.

Ira Hayes, following the war, was plagued with depression brought on by survivor guilt and became an alcoholic. His tragic life, and death in 1955 at the age of 32, were memorialized in the 1961 motion picture The Outsider, starring Tony Curtis as Hayes, and the folk song "The Ballad of Ira Hayes", written by Peter LaFarge and recorded by Johnny Cash in 1964. Bob Dylan later covered the song, as did Kinky Friedman. According to the song, after the war:

Then Ira started drinkin' hard
Jail was often his home
They'd let him raise the flag and lower it
Like you'd throw a dog a bone!
He died drunk early one mornin'
Alone in the land he fought to save
Two inches of water in a lonely ditch
Was a grave for Ira Hayes.

Rene Gagnon, his wife, and his son visited Tokyo and Mount Suribachi on Iwo Jima during the 20th anniversary of the battle of Iwo Jima in 1965. After the war, he worked at Delta Air Lines as a ticket agent, opened his own travel agency, and was a maintenance director of an apartment complex in Manchester, New Hampshire. He died while at work in 1979, age 54.

=== In other media ===
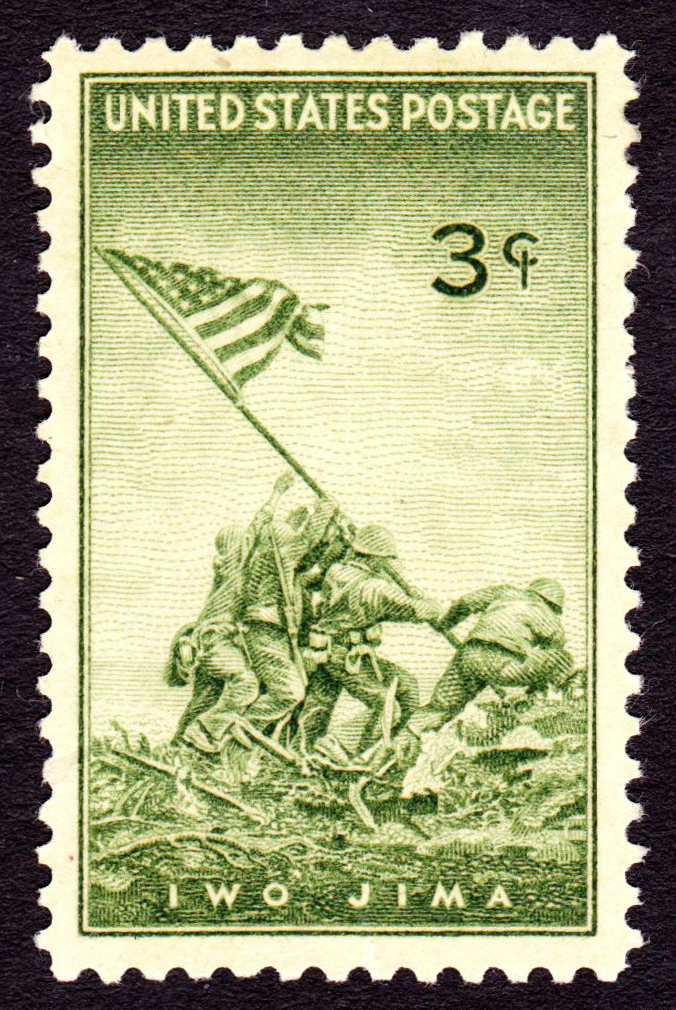
U.S. postage stamp, 1945 issue, commemorating the battle of Iwo Jima

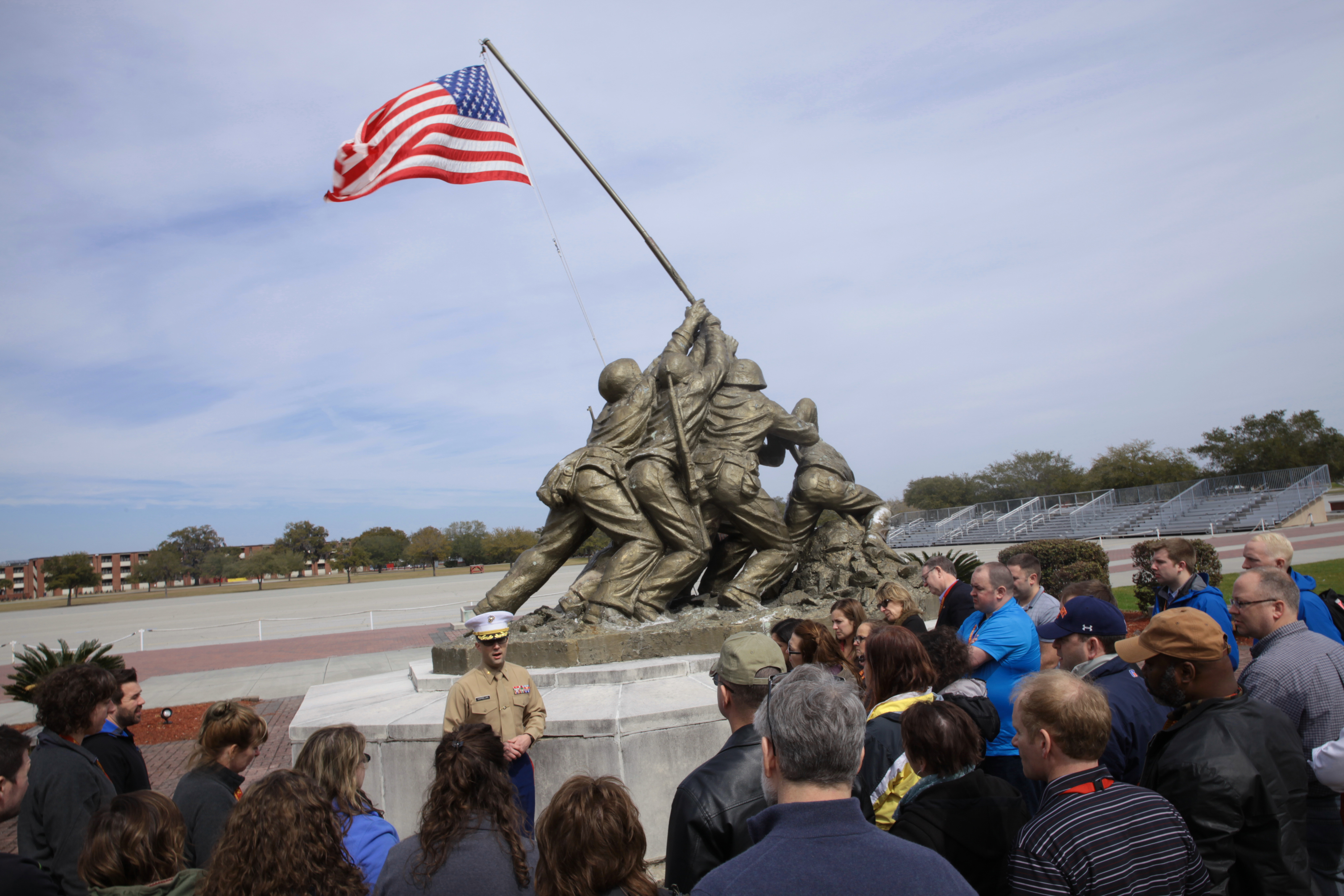
The scale replica of the Marine Corps War Memorial at MCRD Parris Island

Rosenthal's photograph has been reproduced in a number of other formats. It appeared on 3.5 million posters for the seventh war bond drive. It has also been reproduced with many unconventional media such as Lego bricks, butter, ice, Etch A Sketch and corn mazes.

The Iwo Jima flag-raising has been depicted in other films, including 1949's Sands of Iwo Jima (in which the three surviving flag raisers make a cameo appearance at the end of the film) and 1961's The Outsider, a biography of Ira Hayes starring Tony Curtis.

In July 1945, the United States Postal Service released a postage stamp bearing the image. The U.S. issued another stamp in 1995 showing the flag-raising as part of its 10-stamp series marking the 50th anniversary of World War II. In 2005, the United States Mint released a commemorative silver dollar bearing the image.

A similar photograph was taken by Thomas E. Franklin of the Bergen Record in the immediate aftermath of the September 11 attacks. Officially known as Ground Zero Spirit, the photograph is perhaps better known as Raising the Flag at Ground Zero, and shows three firefighters raising a U.S. flag in the ruins of the World Trade Center shortly after 5 pm. Painter Jamie Wyeth also painted a related image entitled September 11th based on this scene. It illustrates rescue workers raising a flag at Ground Zero. Other iconic photographs frequently compared include V-J Day in Times Square, Into the Jaws of Death, Raising a Flag over the Reichstag, and the Raising of the Ink Flag.

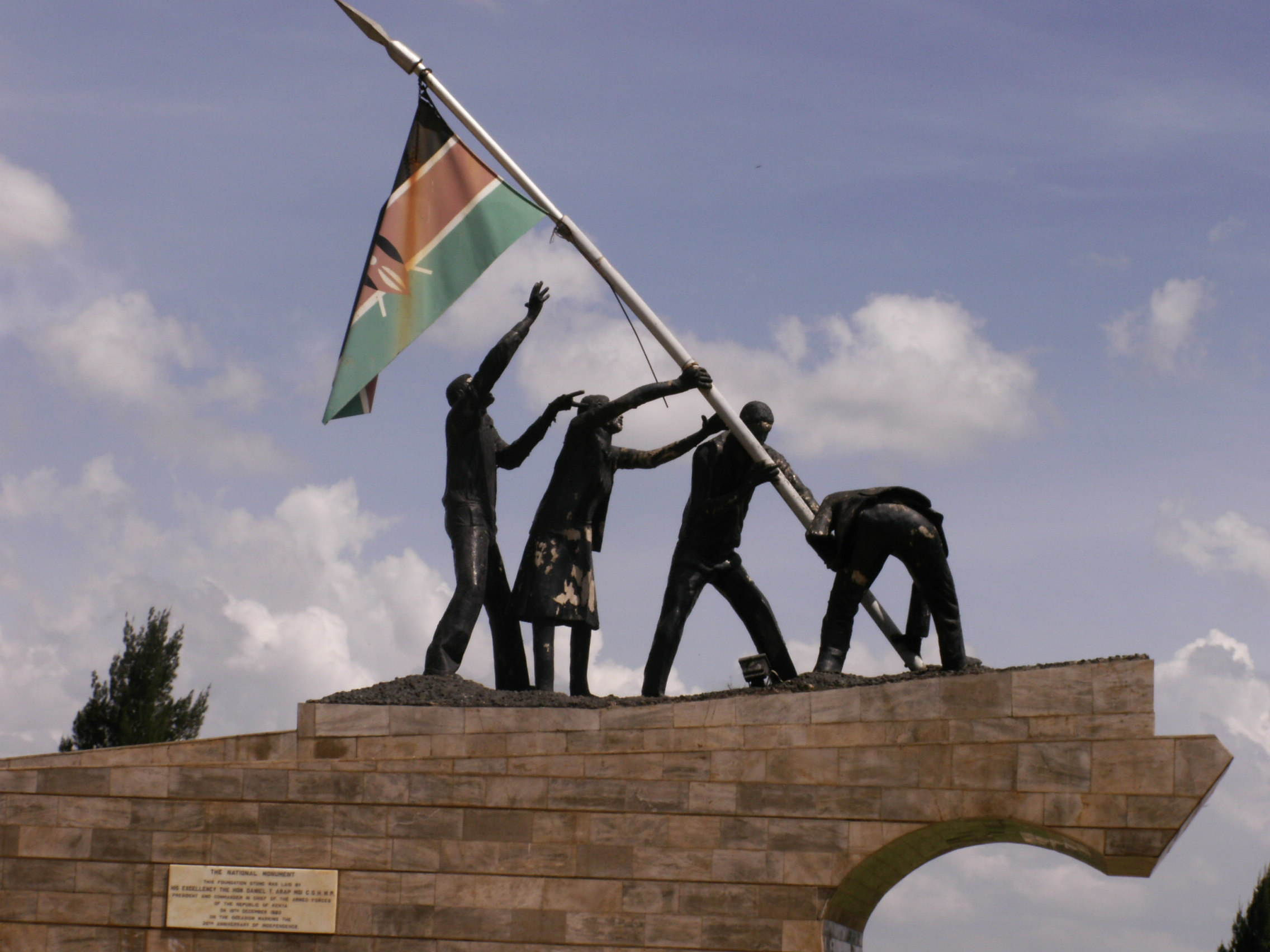
National Monument in Uhuru Park, Nairobi, Kenya, based on the famous image.

The highly recognizable image is one of the most parodied photographs in history. Anti-war activists in the 1960s altered the flag to bear a peace symbol, as well as several anti-establishment artworks. Edward Kienholz's Portable War Memorial in 1968 depicted faceless Marines raising the flag on an outdoor picnic table in a typical American consumerist environment of the 1960s. It was parodied again during the Iran hostage crisis of 1979 to depict the flag being planted into Ayatollah Ruhollah Khomeini's behind. In the early 2000s, to represent gay pride, photographer Ed Freeman shot a photograph for the cover of an issue of Frontiers magazine, reenacting the scene with a rainbow flag instead of an American flag. Time magazine came under fire in 2008 after altering the image for use on its cover, replacing the American flag with a tree for an issue focused on global warming. The British Airlines Stewards and Stewardesses Association likewise came under criticism in 2010 for a poster depicting employees raising a flag marked "BASSA" at the edge of a runway.

Among the smaller scale replicas of the Marine Corps War Memorial based on the flag raising is one also sculpted by Felix de Weldon at Marine Corps Recruit Depot Parris Island on the Peatross Parade Deck. For the finale of The Crucible, the Marines' 54-hour final training test, Marine recruits at Parris Island hike 9 miles to the statue as the sun rises and the flag is raised. They then are addressed on the flag raising and its meaning and are then awarded their Eagle, Globe and Anchor emblems by their drill instructors signifying them as full-fledged Marines.

The logo of the currently ruling National Council for the Safeguard of the Homeland military junta in Niger features a silhouetted version of the photograph, however replacing the American flag with a Nigerien flag.

In 2021 the Taliban posted a series of photos after the announcement that the Americans were withdrawing from Afghanistan. One of the photos posted shows Taliban soldiers raising a flag which has a notable similarity to Raising the Flag on Iwo Jima, although it is uncertain if this was their intent or merely a coincidental similarity.

== See also ==
- List of photographs considered the most important
- The Ink Flag
- Shadow of Suribachi: Raising the Flags on Iwo Jima
- Raising a Flag over the Reichstag
- Raising the Flag on the Three-Country Cairn
- Raising the Flag at Ground Zero
- History of the United States Marine Corps
- C. C. Beall
- The Marine Corps War Memorial

== Bibliography ==
- Alexander, Joseph H. (1994). Closing In: Marines in the Seizure of Iwo Jima. Marines in World War II Commemorative Series. Washington, D.C.: History and Museums Division, Headquarters, U.S. Marine Corps. OCLC 32194668.
- Bradley, James; Powers, Ron (2006) [2000]. Flags of Our Fathers. New York: Bantam. ISBN 978-0-553-38415-4.
- Brown, Rodney (2019). Iwo Jima Monuments: The Untold Story. War Museum. ISBN 978-1-733-42943-6.
- Buell, Hal (2006). Uncommon Valor, Common Virtue: Iwo Jima and the Photograph that Captured America. Berkeley, California: Berkeley Publishing Group/Penguin Group. ISBN 978-0-425-20980-6.
- Clancy, Tom (1996). Marine: A Guided Tour of a Marine Expeditionary Unit. Penguin Group US. ISBN 978-1-429-52009-6.
- Leckie, Robert (1967). The Battle of Iwo Jima. Maps by Ted Burwell. New York: Random House. ISBN 978-0-394-90418-4.
- Robertson, Breanne; Neimeyer, Charles; Nash, Douglas (2019). Investigating Iwo: The Flag Raisings in Myth, Memory & Esprit de Corps (PDF). Marine Corps History Division. ISBN 978-1-732-00307-1. Archived (PDF) from the original on January 22, 2021. This article incorporates text from this source, which is in the public domain.
- Warren, James A. (2007). American Spartans: The U.S. Marines: A Combat History from Iwo Jima to Iraq. New York: Simon and Schuster. ISBN 978-1-416-53297-2.
- Weinberg, Gerhard L. (1994). A World at Arms: A Global History of World War II. Cambridge; New York: Cambridge University Press. ISBN 978-0-521-55879-2.
- Willie, Clarence E. (2010). African American Voices from Iwo Jima: Personal Accounts of the Battle. McFarland. ISBN 978-0-786-45694-9.
