= Jamestown Rediscovery =

Built in 1607 on the site of the British colony later renamed Jamestowne

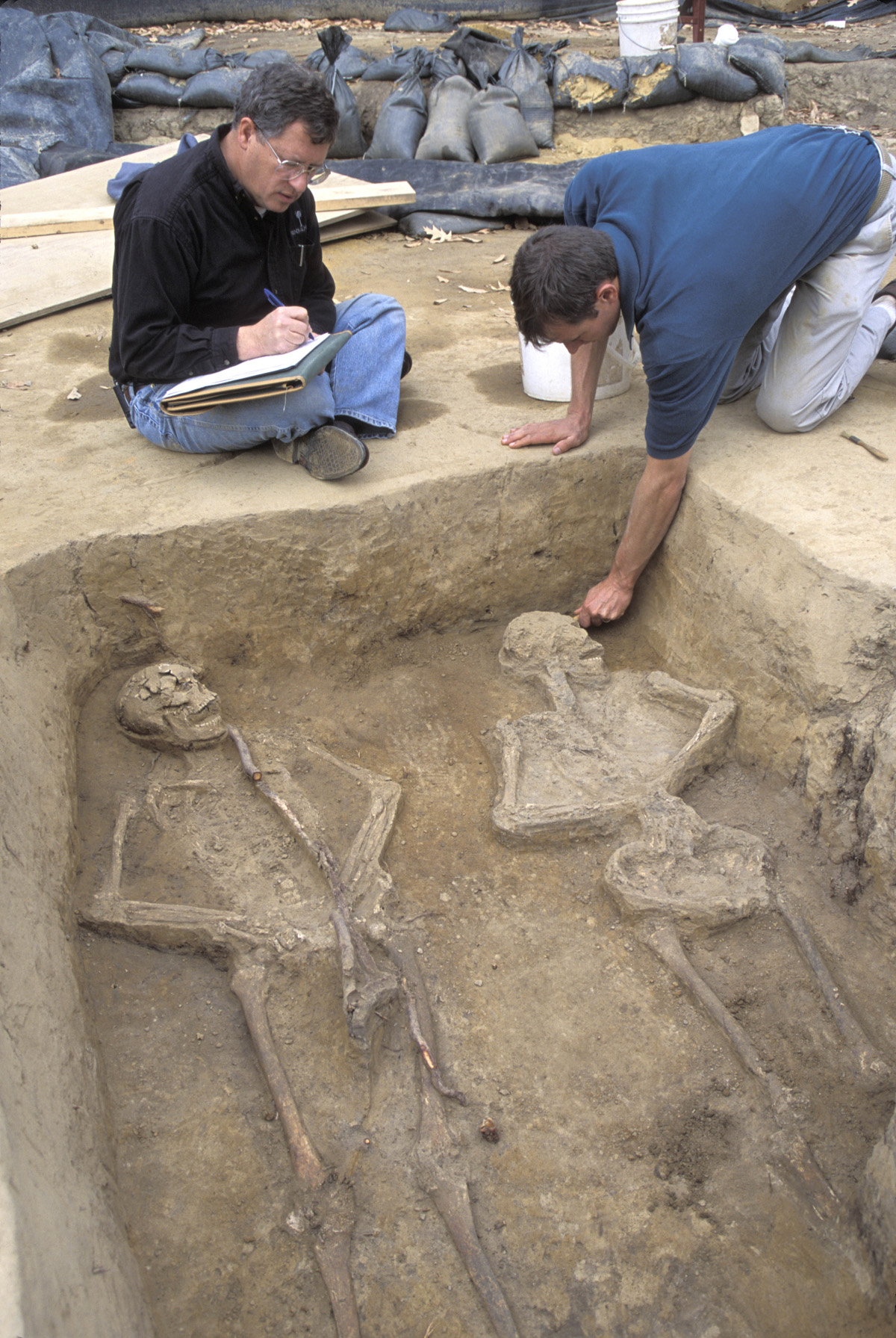
Douglas Owsley (left) and Danny Schmidt examining the possible remains of Captain Bartholomew Gosnold (left)

Jamestown Rediscovery is an archaeological project of Preservation Virginia (formerly the Association for the Preservation of Virginia Antiquities) investigating the remains of the original English settlement at Jamestown established in the Virginia Colony in North America beginning on May 14, 1607.

In 1994, at the behest of Preservation Virginia, archaeologist William Kelso began directing excavations at Historic Jamestown on Jamestown Island. By 1996, the Jamestown Rediscovery team had discovered the foundations of the 1607 James Fort, long thought to have disappeared in the waters of the James River. It was initially a 10-year project, but given the wealth of knowledge and artifacts uncovered throughout its lifetime, it has been continued indefinitely.

== History ==
In 1994, Preservation Virginia agreed to fund a 10-year archaeological project called Jamestown Rediscovery, in order to survey and explore their land. The original goal was to locate archaeological remains of "the first years of settlement at Jamestown, especially of the earliest fortified town; [and the] subsequent growth and development of the town".

On April 4 work was begun in the area near the church protected by the 1900 sea wall, and archaeologists quickly discovered early colonial artifacts. In 1996, they successfully located parts of the palisade of the original 1607 James Fort. The governor announced this discovery on September 12.

Subsequent excavations have shown that only one corner of the first triangular fort (which contained the original settlement) was destroyed. In 2006, the first well located in a cellar on the site was excavated. In 2007, to mark the 400th anniversary, Queen Elizabeth II re-visited the site (having first been there in 1957).

In 2010, archaeologists discovered the site of the second church constructed at Jamestown. In May 2013, in conjunction with the Smithsonian Institution, the project announced the discovery of a young English woman who had been cannibalized during the "starving time" winter of 1609–1610. In July 2015, the remains of four principals of the colony were identified by the Rediscovery/Smithsonian team. From late 2016, attention has moved to the Memorial Church.

== Influence of research ==
Since it began, the extended archaeological campaign has made multiple significant discoveries. It has uncovered much of the fort, the remains of several houses and wells, a palisade wall line attached to the fort, and the graves of several early settlers. Visitors can now view the site of James Fort, the 17th-century church tower, and the site of the 17th-century town, as well as tour an archaeological museum called the Archaearium and view some of the artifacts found.

Excavations continuing on the site have uncovered evidence of the Starving Time winter of 1609/10, the arrival of the survivors from the Bermuda shipwreck Sea Venture, and close to 1.5 million artifacts. Numerous colonial structures have been identified, including temporary soldiers' shelters, row houses, wells, the storehouse, and the 1608 church. The original 10-year archaeological project has continued well past this period. Current visitors to the site can see ongoing excavation efforts as they continue to unearth the original settlement's buildings and artifacts near the James Fort site and Jamestown Church.

Several of the archaeologist teams' discoveries have been named as the top 10 archaeology finds in various years by Archaeology. In 2013 they found evidence that the colonists had likely resorted to cannibalism during the "starving time", and in 2010 discovered the remains of the original church built inside James Fort. In 2015 four graves within it were found to belong to important Jamestown settlers.

=== Supposed loss ===
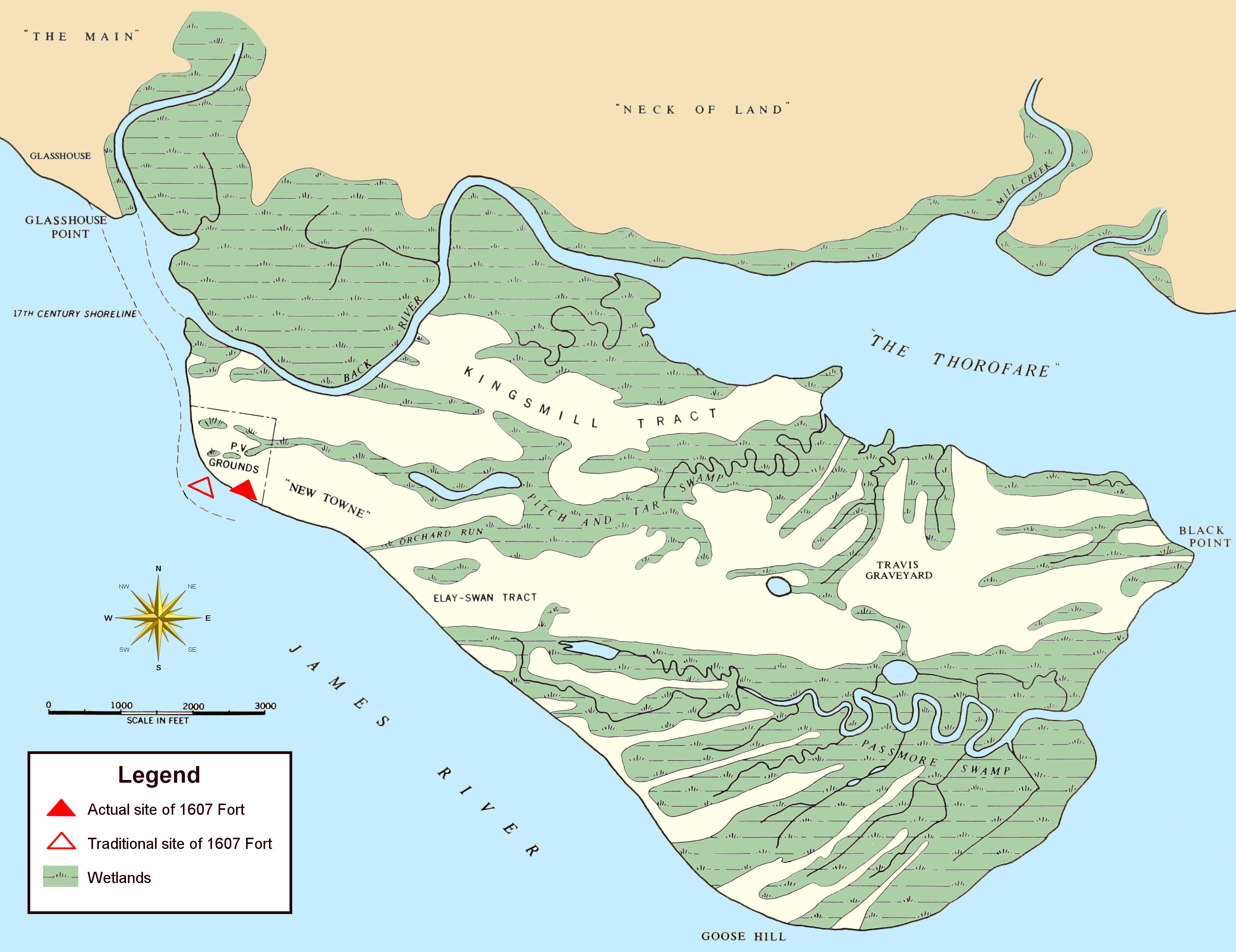
1958 image of Jamestown Island showing the supposed and actual locations of the fort

Jamestown Rediscovery corrects a historical myth long believed to be true: that the site of the original Jamestown settlement of 1607 had washed into the James River long ago by erosion and tides. The archaeologists, including William Kelso, Beverly (Bly) Straube, and Nick Luccketti, used primary source material to estimate the location of the fort on Jamestown Island. Sources included the Zuniga Map, made by a Spanish spy of the same name, and the accounts of original colonists, such as William Strachey, Captain Ralph Hamor, and John Smith.

Upon analysis of these sources and other buildings, the Jamestown Rediscovery archaeologists discovered the postholes of the original fort; discoloration in the soil left evidence of the palisades and bulwarks that once formed the fort wall. After expanding the dig, the archaeologists were able to validate that the Jamestown Fort had begun to wash into the James River, but was instead covered inadvertently by a Confederate earthwork during the American Civil War. Throughout this excavation, the team discovered evidence of fort buildings, artifacts, and the remains of settlers.

=== Wealth of finds ===
To date the project has retrieved more than two million artifacts, a large fraction of them from the first few years of the settlement's history. The discovery of a well within the limits of the Jamestown fort is less critical for understanding the colonial attempt to find a fresh water source and more important due to the artifacts found in the well. Wells that had stopped providing (or never provided) drinkable water were frequently filled in with the refuse of daily life, which gave the archaeologists the opportunity to look at a concentrated collection of stratified artifacts.

Tobacco pipes, pottery sherds, and combat armor all help date the excavation site to the early 17th century, giving even more support to the positive identification of the fort. In this case, curator Beverly Straube was able to substantiate evidence regarding the professional work done by the original settlers. Goldsmiths, bricklayers, masons, perfumers, tailors, fishermen, coopers, blacksmiths, glassmakers, carpenters, and tobacco pipe makers are among the dominant professions for which there is archaeological evidence.

=== Notable figures ===
The Jamestown Rediscovery project recovered and cataloged the remains of many of the original Jamestown settlers. For example, one of the first human finds was the skeleton of a higher-status man aged around 19-20 who died due to a musket shot to the lower right leg that shattered the bones and led to a quick death. The skeleton was examined by the Smithsonian, and the flattened skull was forensically reconstructed and imagined.

Later, among the discoveries in the cellar was the skull of a young woman who had clearly been cannibalized. She was around fourteen years old at the time of her death from unknown causes. The research team has named her "Jane", and her identity is unknown. Although DNA samples have been saved for future examination, there is little hope of identifying modern relatives for comparative testing.

A grave site with indications of an important figure was also located. The skeletal remains of one of the original colonists was found separated from the other burials and located in a place of honor near one of the fort's gates. The individual had been buried in a coffin, along with a staff signifying leadership. It had long been thought that Baron De La Warr, who died en route to the colony from England on his second trip, had been buried elsewhere, but some recent research concluded that his body was brought to Jamestown for burial. Some theorize the remains to be that of Captain Bartholomew Gosnold, one of the organizers of the colony, though others have claimed it to be the remains of Thomas West, 3rd Baron De La Warr. While inquiries continue regarding the identity of this individual is, including genealogical study in England, his identity remains unknown.

Remains were also excavated from the chancel of the church built in 1608 – "potentially the first Protestant church built in the new world, and the men's burial there signals their high status in the colony, the researchers said". The four are potentially identified as "Rev. Robert Hunt, thought to be the first Anglican minister in the Americas; Capt. Gabriel Archer, the early expeditionary leader; Sir Ferdinando Wainman, the cousin of Sir Thomas West, the Virginian governor; and Capt. William West, the governor's uncle". At present, these identifications are based on circumstantial evidence.

=== Unique identity ===
The first settlers included men with experience of warfare and fort-building in the Low Countries during the Dutch Revolt. These people brought a wider set of skills and experiences than the English settlers. Further, the ongoing needs to adapt to life in Virginia and to interact with the indigenous peoples soon led to the expression of local culture, as evidence in artefacts such as modified armor or locally made clay pipes.

== Gallery ==
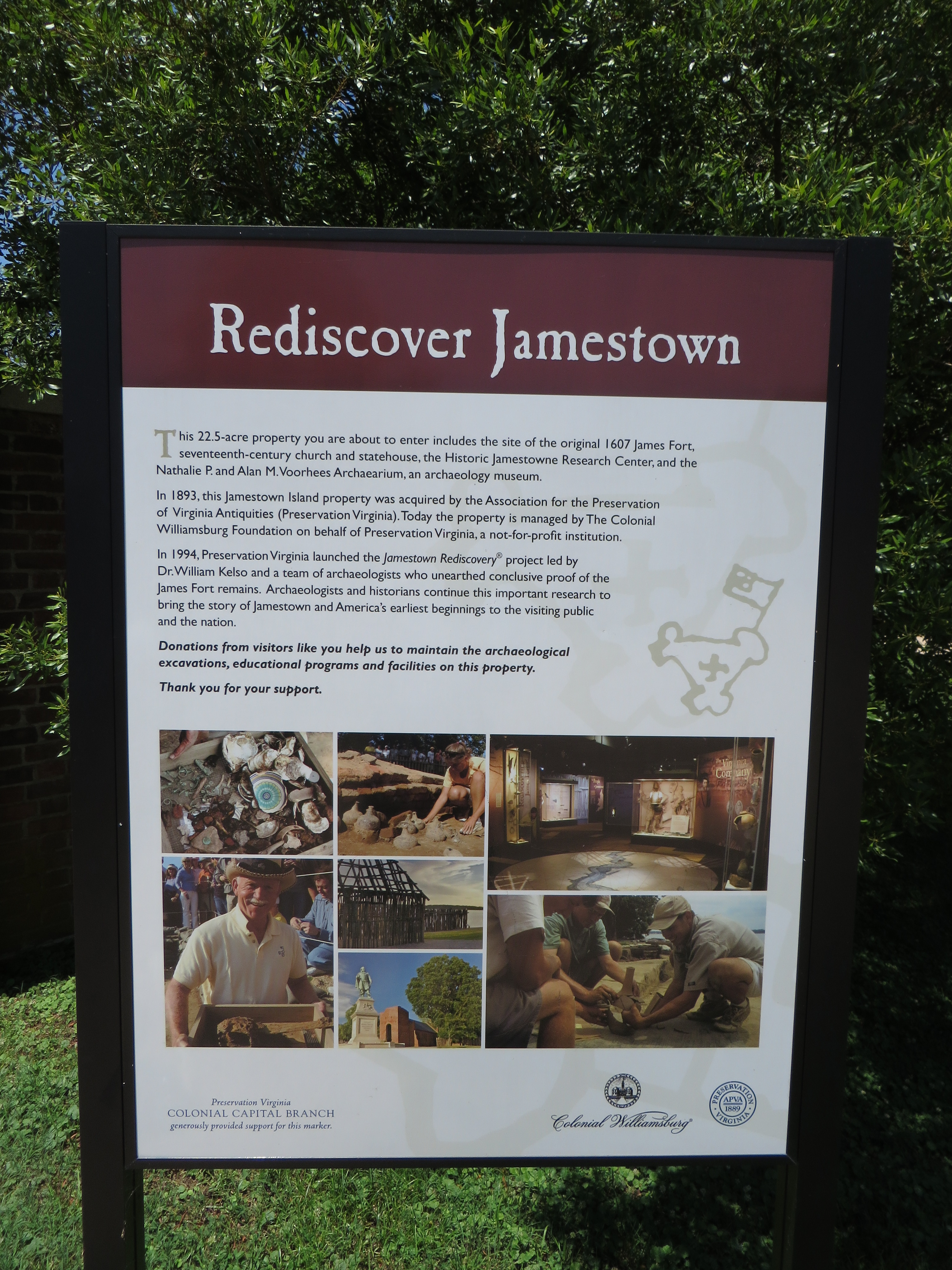
Interpretive sign

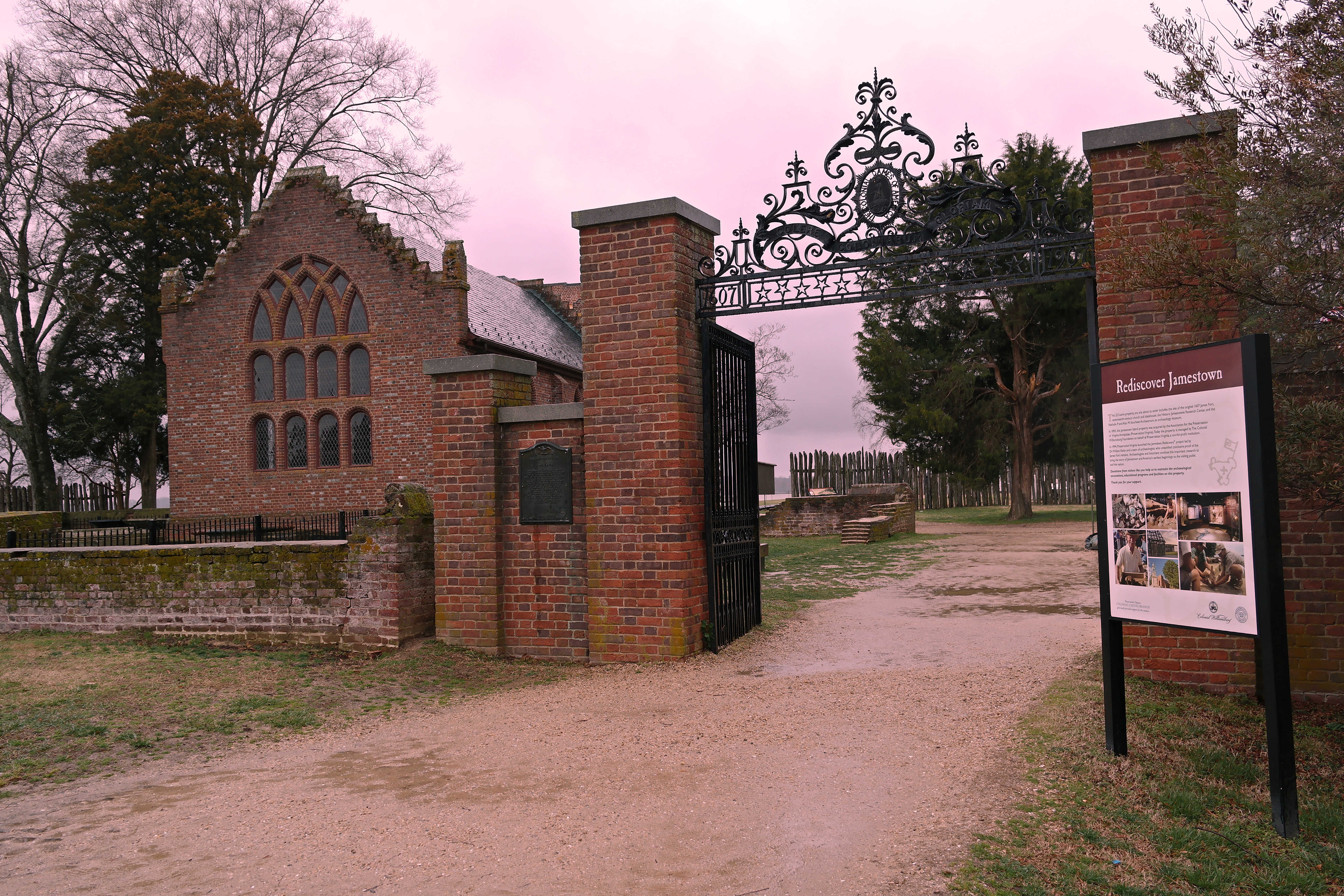
Main entrance, near the church, 2015

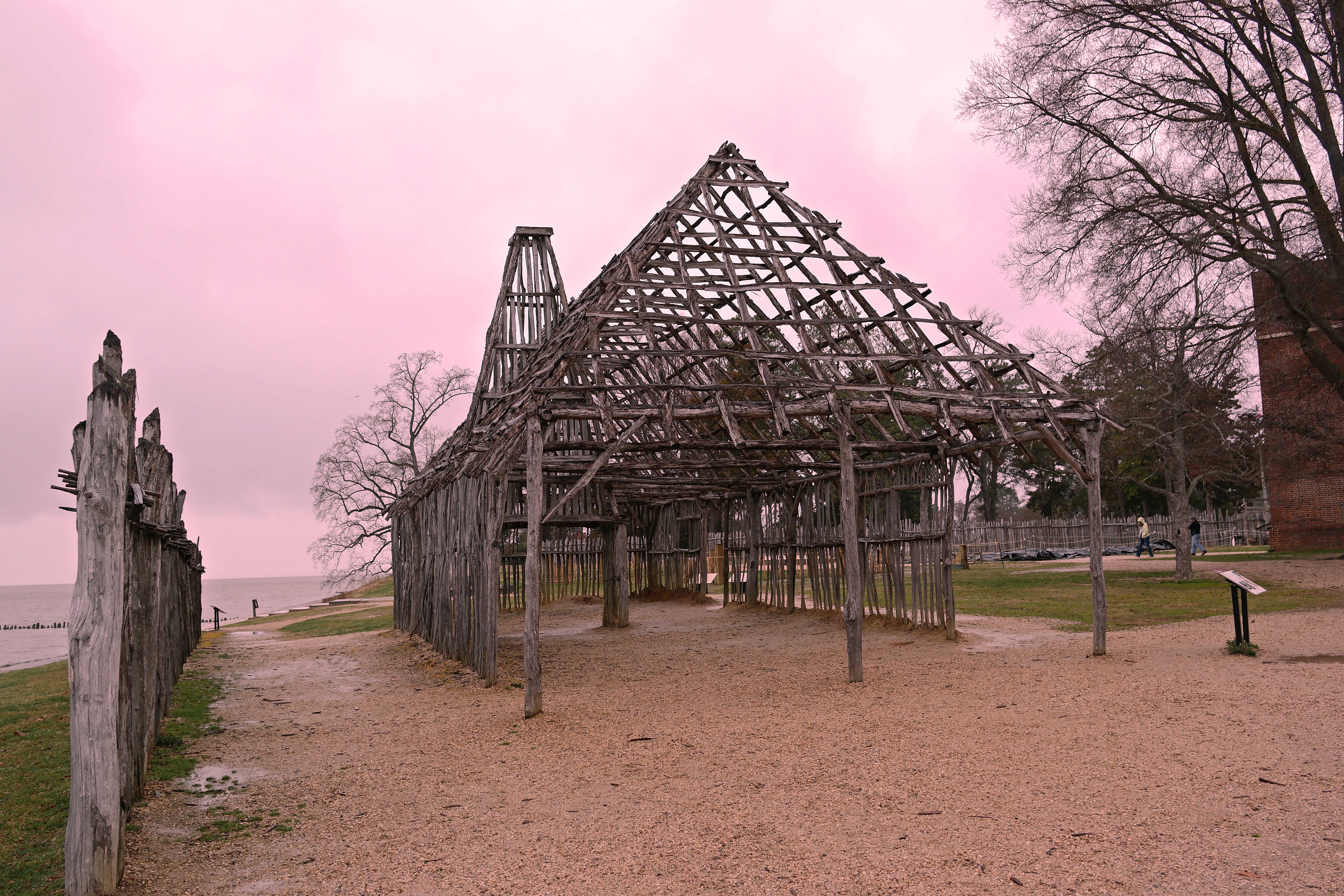
The site in 2015

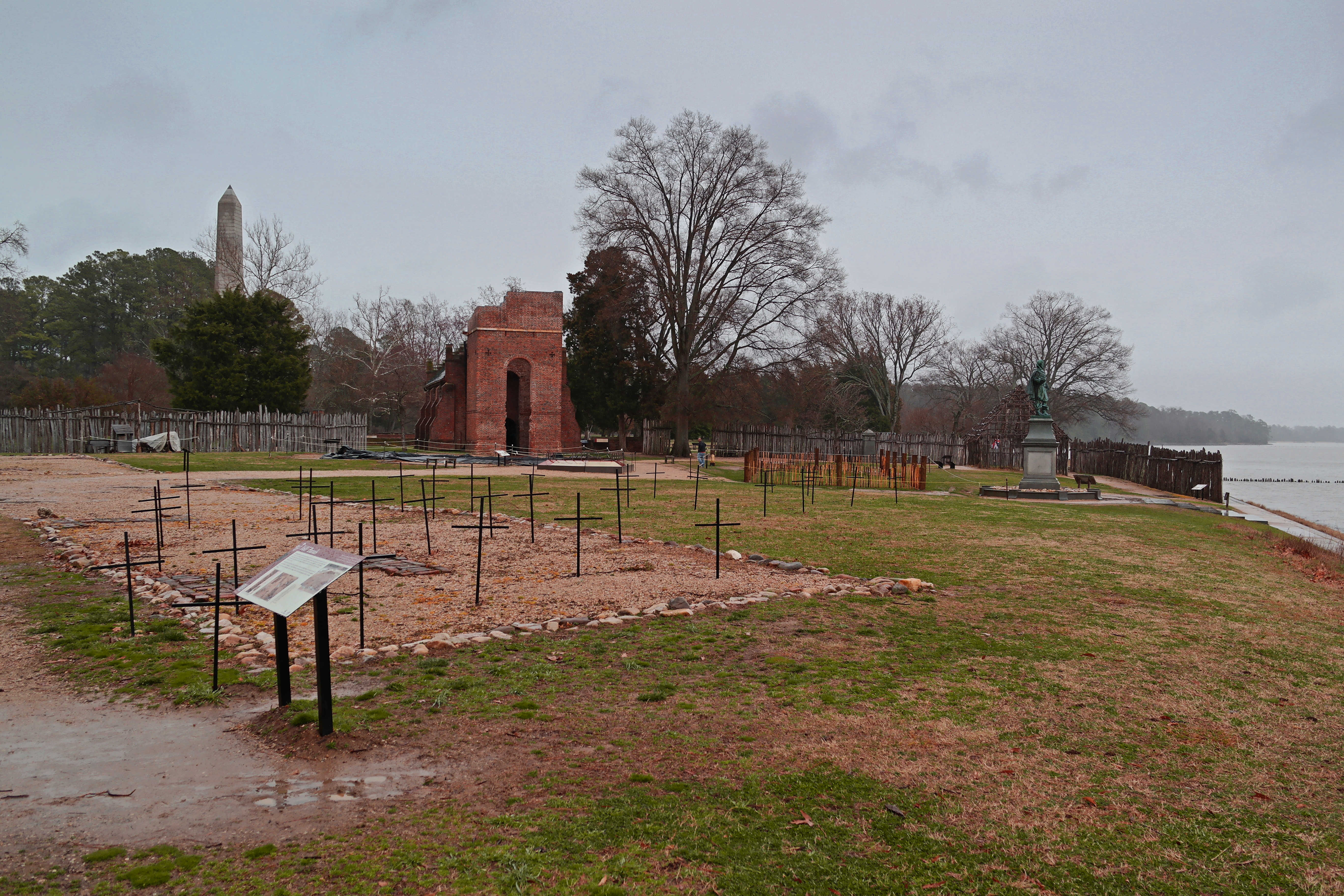
View from the riverside, 2015

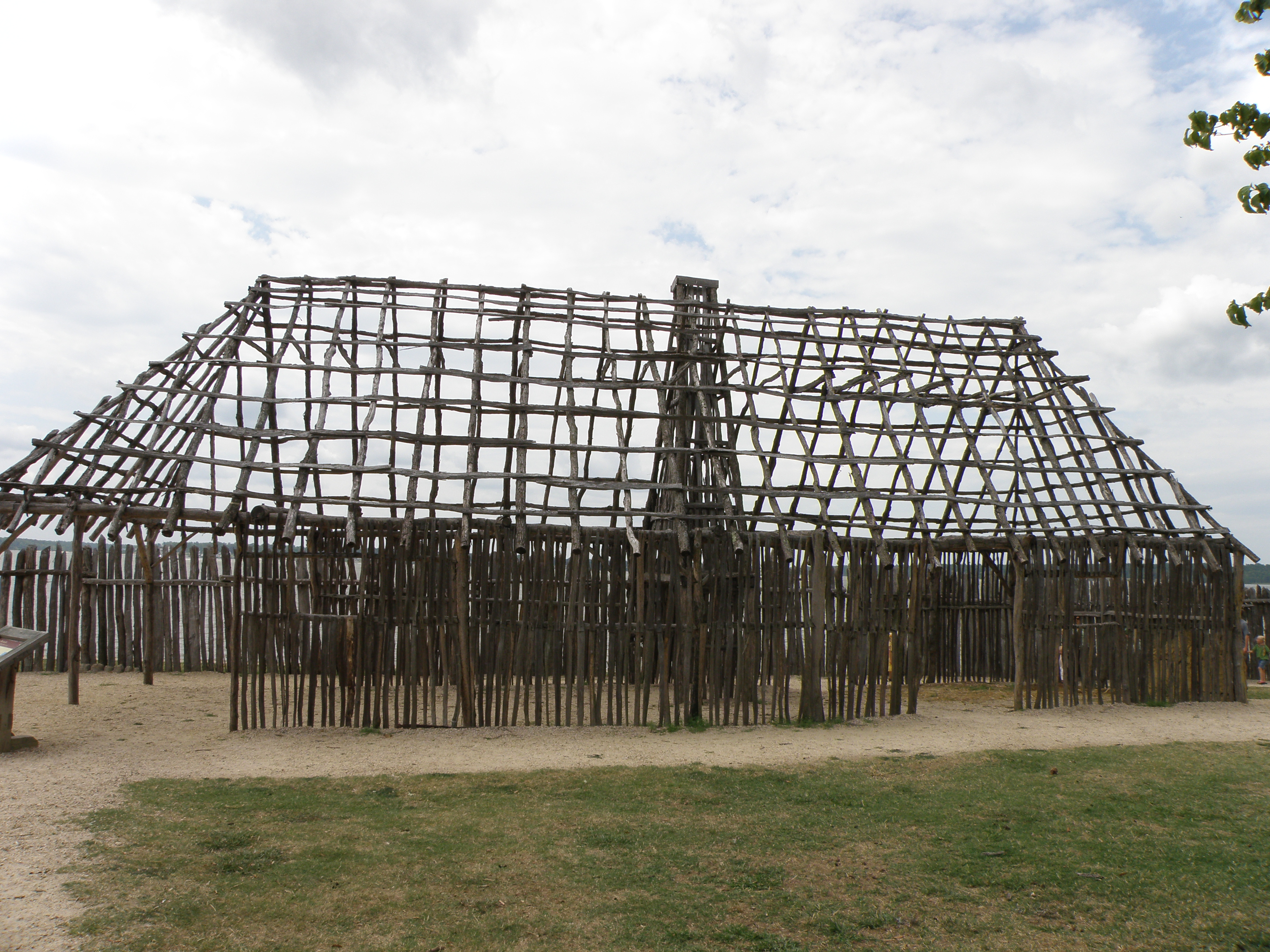
Wooden barracks frame, 2010

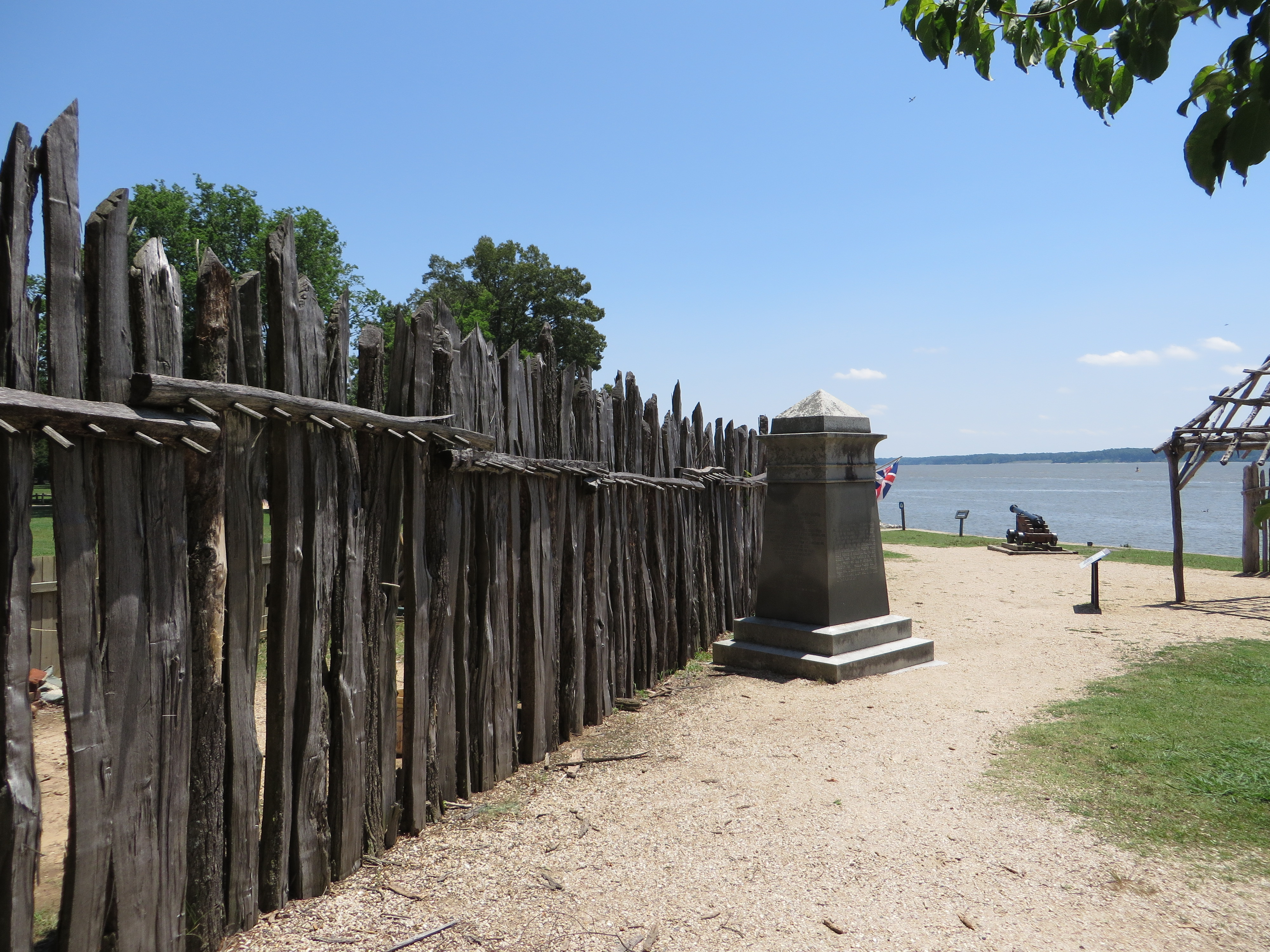
The site in 2014

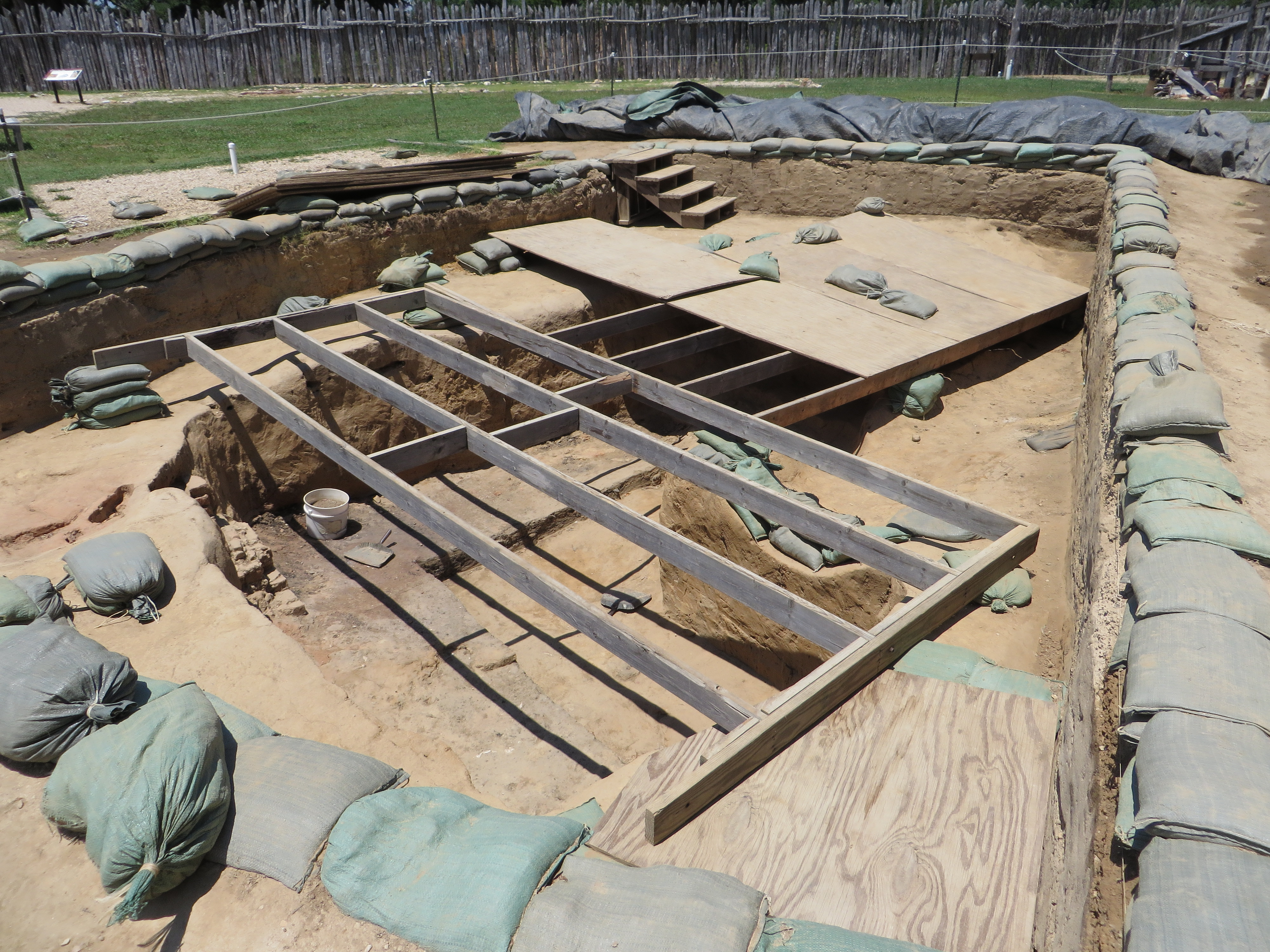
The site in 2014

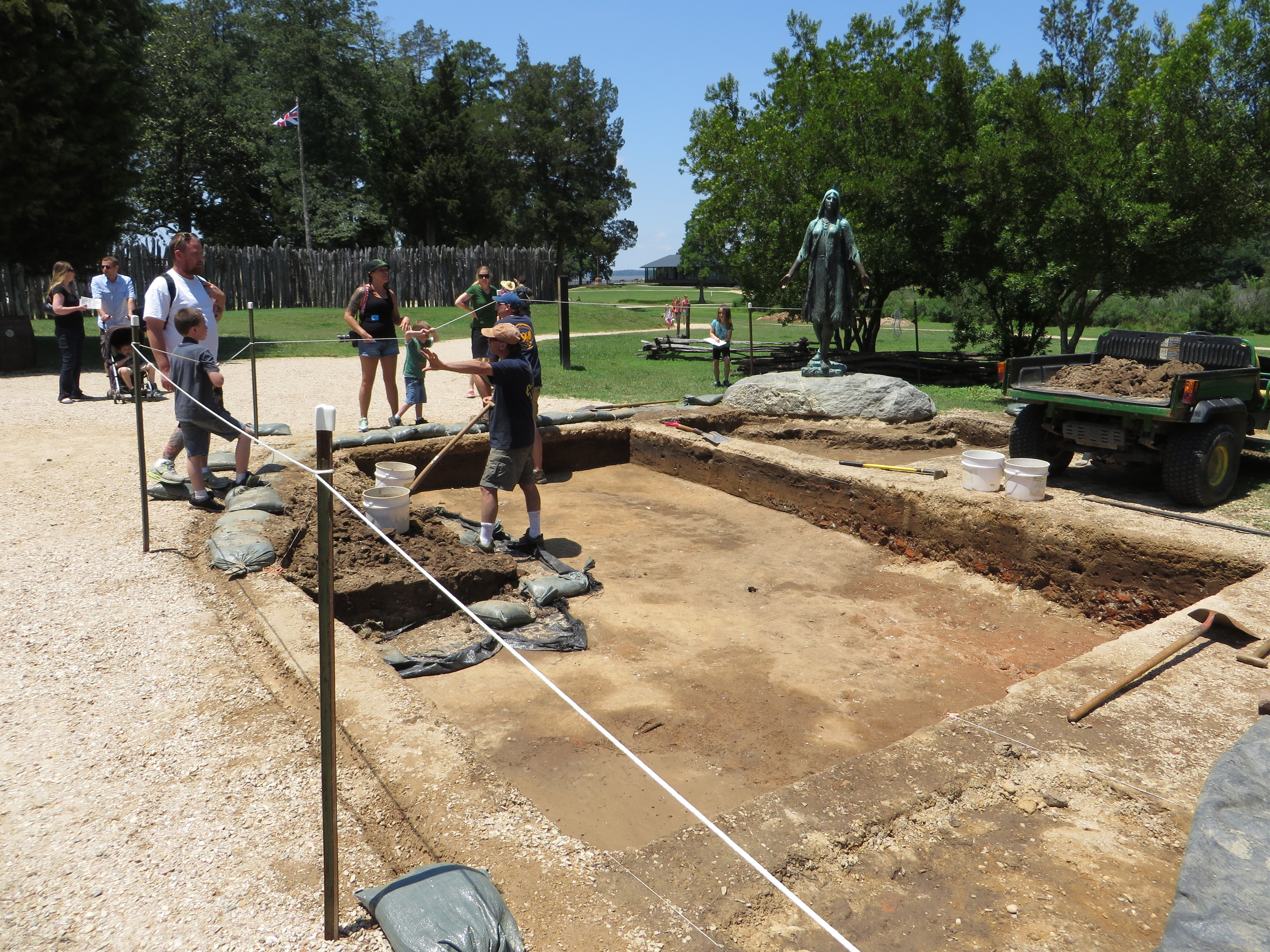
The site in 2014

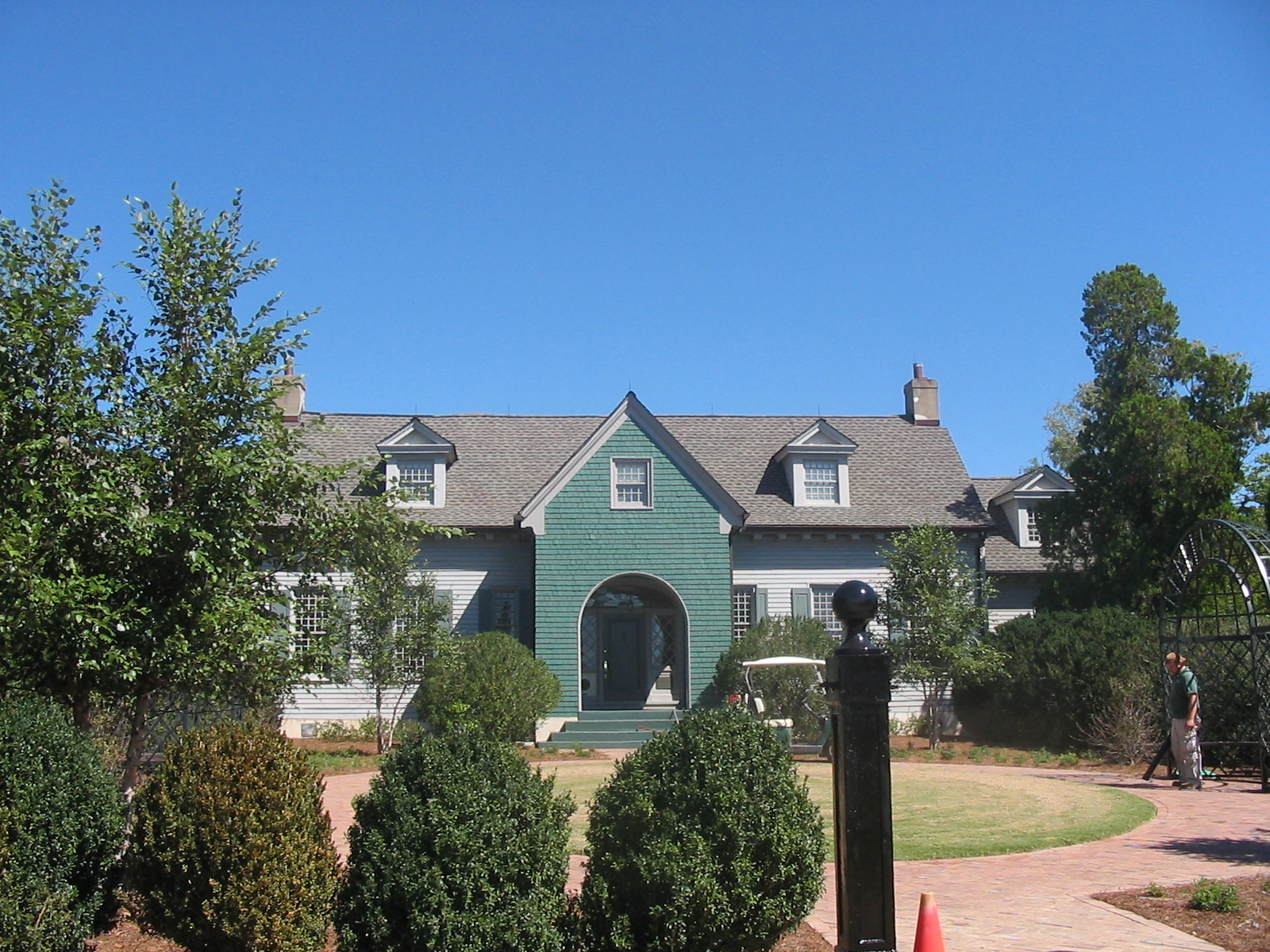
Yeardley House, location of the project's offices
