= The Knight's Tombstone =

Oldest surviving tombstone in United States

- Height: 6'
- Width: 3'
- Weight: 1200 lbs
- Symbols: Knight, shield, scroll
- Created: 1627
- Discovered: 1901
- Classification: Oldest surviving tombstone in US.

The Knight's Tombstone is a significant artifact from early American colonial history, located in Jamestown, Virginia, the site of the first permanent English settlement in North America established in 1607. This tombstone, dating back to 1627, is notable for being one of the oldest surviving tombstones in the United States and for its historical and archaeological importance. The stone is evidence of an intricate trade route that developed between Europe and early colonial America. The tombstone is currently showcased at Memorial Church in Historic Jamestowne, Virginia.

== History ==
The Knight’s Tombstone was discovered in 1901 by Association for the Preservation of Virginia Antiquities excavators who were preparing the land for construction of the Memorial Church in Jamestown, Virginia. The tombstone dates back to 1627 and is possibly the oldest surviving tombstone in the United States. The tombstone is composed of Belgian limestone but during the period the stone was often referred to as black marble.

The stone is believed to belong to Sir George Yeardley, Governor of the early Virginia colony, who died in 1627. The attribution was made through a surviving relative, his step grandson, Adam Thorowgood II who made mention of Yeardley’s tombstone inscription in his memoirs. The tombstone was likely part of a Yeardley’s tomb and was likely moved in 1640 with the construction of the third church in Jamestown.

No remains were found when the tombstone was initially discovered but, in 2018 an archeological excavation discovered remains that are theorized to be Yeardley’s based on location of the remains and the age of the deceased. Although the head is missing, 10 teeth have been found and test were carried out by the FBI and archaeologist and geneticist Turi King. In 2025, a DNA comparison was done with a descendent of Katherin Yeardley (George's sister), which did not yield a successful match to the remains.

The tombstone was discovered in 1901 but was missing the brass fittings that should have been part of the tombstone. It is likely the inlays were destroyed during Bacon's Rebellion in 1676. It was repaired at the time with portland cement which is now known to be a destructive method of repair.

== Description ==
The tombstone is approximately 6 ft × 3 ft (1.83 m × 0.91 m), weighing 1,200 lb (540 kg). The face of the stone has remains of carvings of an effigy of a knight and a shield which would have contained a coat of arms, a scroll and a border, all of which would have been brass inlays.

A study was conducted by archaeologists Marcus Key and Rebecca Rossi through Dickinson College to determine the source of the “black marble” tombstone. Researchers analyzed fragments of The Knight’s Tombstone for microfossils which included six species of foraminiferans. Based on when the species of the microfossils found existed, the limestone is estimated to be 340–336 million years old. These fossils were found to have occurred in areas of Belgium and Ireland in the Viséan Age but were not found in North America.

The research concluded that the stone was likely from a quarry in modern Belgium before it was shipped to London for carving. The stone would have then journeyed across the Atlantic to its final destination in Jamestown.

== Restoration ==
Restoration of The Knight’s Tombstone by Preservation Virginia and Jonathan Appell.

The Knight’s Tombstone was likely moved several times before its rediscovery in 1901 since there had been several churches built on the original location including the original in 1617 and again in the 1640s and 1680s.

The discovery by APVA in 1901 led to the stone being repaired with a common material at the time, portland cement, and being installed in the floor of the 1906 Memorial church. A photo of the stone from the time period shows that the stone was already in several pieces before its restoration and missing the brass inlays that could have helped identify the owner.

In 2017, Preservation Virginia began the process of restoring the stone for the 400th anniversary of the first representative assembly meeting in Virginia, which was founded in 1619 under Yeardley’s governorship.

Preservation Virginia brought in monument repair expert Jonathan Appell of Atlas Preservation to handle the restoration. It was determined that the portland cement used in 1901 had to be removed so the stone could be reassembled with more modern materials that would help its preservation and restoration. A process of chiseling and grinding the cement to remove the stone from its resting place was performed by Appell before ramps were assembled with pulleys to move the pieces to a trailer where the restoration could proceed.

The rest of the Portland cement was removed from the pieces before it was realized that earlier restoration efforts had led to the stone to be coated in a primitive clear glue to try and preserve it. In addition to removing the glue, primitive quarry techniques led to other challenges due to rough edges which would not be a concern on more modern stones.

Once the pieces were assembled on the trailer, wooden shims were used to adjust the pieces to matching heights, epoxy was used to reattach the pieces with clamps holding the whole artifact together while the epoxy dried.

Color matched mortar was used to seal the stone back together before the stone was put on display at the National Park Museum for spectators to enjoy while restoration on the church continued.

The Knight's Tombstone lowered onto 30 lbs of ice by Jonathan Appell so, it will settle into its final resting spot as the ice melts.

Once restoration of the tombstone’s resting spot in the church was complete, Appell used a series of straps with a tripod rig to move the stone into position in the steel casing in the floor at Memorial Church in Historic Jamestowne. The stone was lowered onto a bed of 30 bags of ice weighing 600 lbs which allowed the wooden casing and shims to be removed and allowed the stone to settle into place without using any straps. Buckets and a vacuum was used to remove the melting water while the stone settled into its final resting place.

Its final location is a steel encasement surrounded by brick, lit by LED lights and covered with glass inside the Memorial Church.

== Significance ==
The Knight's Tombstone final resting spot in Memorial Church in Historic Jamestowne.

The ledger stone is attributed as the oldest surviving tombstone in the US as Indian graves were usually marked with wooden markers that have deteriorated over the centuries.

The stone’s discovery and information on its provenance suggest a robust trade route between the colonies and Europe in the early 1600’s already existed. The cost of securing and shipping a stone of this size across the Atlantic also serve to show the importance of the stone’s likely owner, Sir George Yeardly, who was an early colonial governor and one of the earliest slave owners in the colonies.

Jonathan Appell, CEO of monument restoration company Atlas Preservation, confirmed that this was the earliest use of brass inlays on a tombstone in the US and the first he had seen from the 1600’s.

== See also ==
- Colonial history of the United States
- Historic Jamestown
- George Yeardley
