= Thomas West, 9th Baron De La Warr =

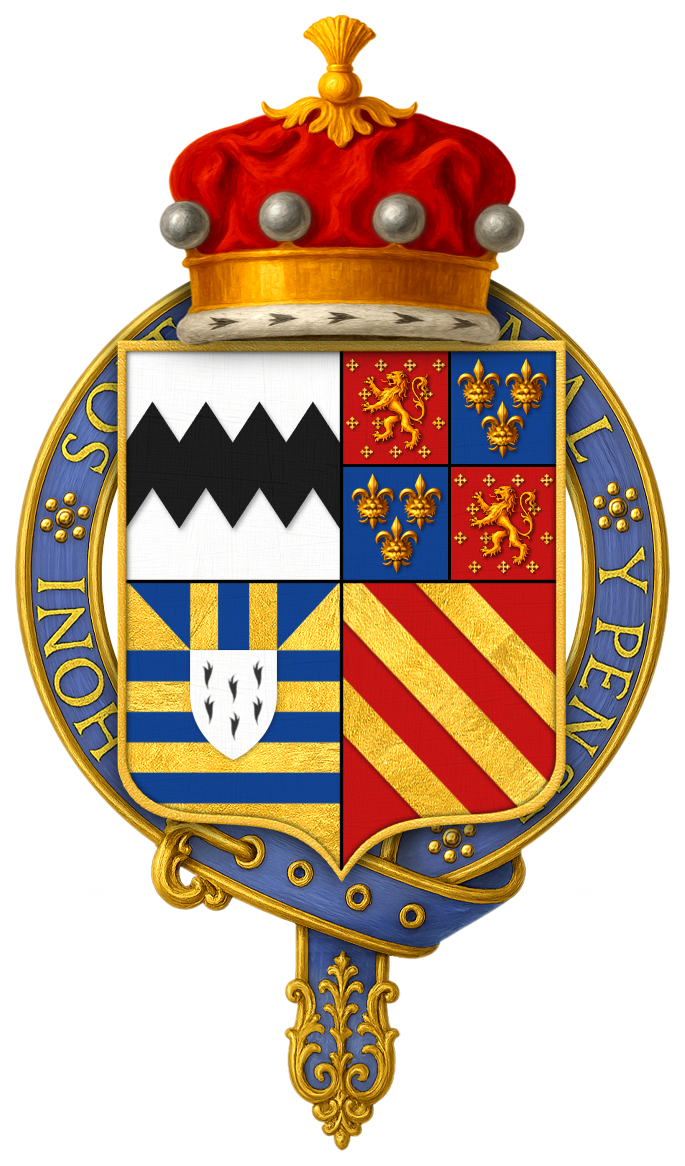
- Arms of Sir Thomas West, 9th Baron De La Warr, KB, KG
- Died: 25 September 1554; Offington
- Buried: St. Mary's Church, Broadwater, Sussex
- Noble family: De La Warr
- Spouse: Elizabeth Bonville
- Father: Thomas West, 8th Baron De La Warr
- Mother: Elizabeth Mortimer

Thomas West, 9th Baron De La Warr and 6th Baron West (c. 1475 – 25 September 1554) was the eldest son of Thomas West, 8th Baron De La Warr, by his second wife, Elizabeth Mortimer, daughter of Sir Hugh Mortimer of Martley and Kyre Wyard, Worcestershire, by Eleanor Cornwall, daughter of Sir Edmund Cornwall.

== Life ==
West married, before 24 August 1494, Elizabeth Bonville, daughter and co-heiress of John Bonville, esquire, of Shute, Devon, by Katherine Wingfield, daughter of Sir Robert Wingfield, but had no issue by her. He succeeded to his titles at the age of 50. He was made Knight of the Garter in 1549 after having fought in France.

== Death and inheritance ==
West died 25 September 1554 at his home at Offington, Sussex, and was buried 10 October at Broadwater. The diarist Henry Machyn recorded his funeral, describing him as "the best house-keeper in Sussex".

At his death, the baronies of West and De La Warr both "fell into abeyance, according to modern doctrine", between the two daughters and co-heirs of his half-brother, Sir Owen West (d. 18 July 1551), eldest son of his father's third marriage to Eleanor Copley. Sir Owen West married Mary Guildford, daughter of George Guildford, esquire, second son of Sir Richard Guildford, by whom he had two daughters: Mary West, who married firstly Sir Adrian Poynings (d. 15 February 1570), and secondly, as his second wife, Sir Richard Rogers (died c.1605); and Anne West.

According to Cokayne:

A new barony of de la Warr was subsequently conferred on the heir male (who was not the heir general), William West, 1st Baron De La Warr, whose son Thomas was allowed the precedence of the ancient Barony of la Warre.

West's heir male, William West, 1st Baron De La Warr, was the elder son of Sir George West (d.1538), second son of West's father's third marriage to Eleanor Copley. According to Riordan:

[In 1549 West] placed a private bill before parliament to disinherit his nephew William West, first Baron De La Warr (c.1519–1595). The latter was the son of the ninth baron's half-brother Sir George West of Warbleton (d. 1538) and his wife, Elizabeth, daughter of Sir Robert Morton of Lechlade, Gloucestershire. His uncle was childless, and had at some time adopted William as his heir. However, West tried to gain the de la Warr estate early by poisoning his uncle. The attempt was unsuccessful and he was in the Tower by October 1548. He was disinherited by an act of parliament in 1550, although he had been reinstated as heir by the time of his uncle's death.

Despite the fact that he had been reinstated as heir by his uncle, when the latter died in 1554 William West was unable to inherit the barony of de la Warr as a result of the Act of Parliament of 1550 which had deprived him of all honours. Two years later he was involved in the Dudley conspiracy, and on 30 June 1556 was arraigned at the Guildhall on charges of treason, to which he responded as "William, Lord de la Warr", forcing the heralds to prove during the trial that he was not entitled to the barony and therefore not entitled to a trial by his peers in the House of Lords. He was convicted of treason. However the death sentence was not carried out, and in 1557 he was pardoned by Queen Mary. He fought at the siege of St. Quentin in that year, and in 1563, early in the reign of Queen Elizabeth, was restored in blood. On 5 February 1570 he was knighted, and on the same day created Baron De La Warr, which was regarded as a new creation of the title.

== Notes ==
Peerage of England
| Preceded by Thomas West | Baron De La Warr; 1st creation 1525–1554 | In abeyance Ultimately William West, 1st Baron De La Warr |
| Preceded by Thomas West | Baron West; 1525–1554 | In abeyance |
