= Jane West (aristocrat) =

English aristocrat

Jane West (1558–1621) was an English aristocrat.

She was a daughter of William West, 1st Baron De La Warr (died 1595) and Elizabeth Strange, a daughter of Thomas Strange of Chesterton, Gloucestershire.

In June 1572, Jane West married Thomas Wenman (died 1577), son of Sir Richard Wenman, by whom she had three sons, Richard Wenman, 1st Viscount Wenman, Ferdinand Wenman and Sir Thomas Wenman, and a daughter, Elizabeth Wenman, who married Sir Thomas Tredway.

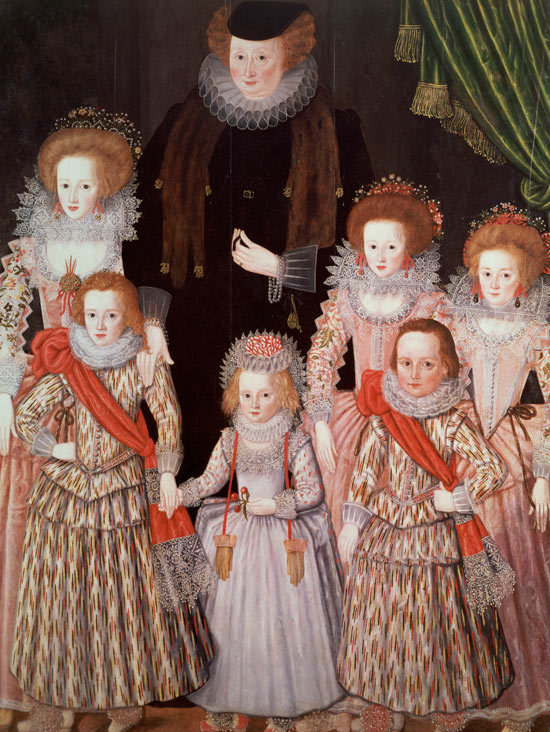
The family of Lettice Cressy, unknown artist, c. 1615

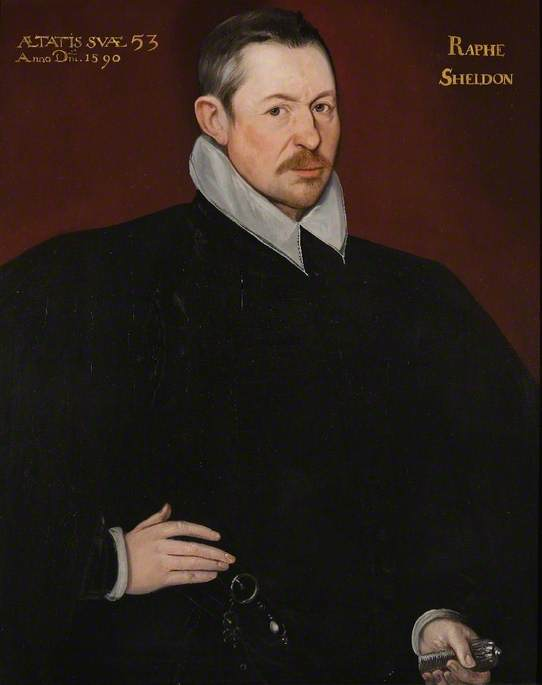
Ralph Sheldon (1537–1613) by Hieronimo Custodis

Her second husband was James Cressy of Wilton, Buckinghamshire. They had a daughter, Lettice Cressy, who married Sir John Tasburgh of Flixton.

In January 1588 she married Thomas Tasburgh (died 1602) of Hawridge, Buckinghamshire. Her fourth husband was Ralph Sheldon (died 1613) of Beoley, Worcestershire.

Her portrait, (known as "Mrs Ralph Sheldon"), was painted around the year 1593 by an unknown artist. Her costume jewels are carefully depicted, including rope of pearls, and a large sculptural jewel of enamelled gold with Orpheus and his lute surrounded by animals. Her velvet girdle is set with pearls or knots of pearls, with a table diamond set in gold with a pendant pearl at the front. Elizabeth I owned a similar "waist girdle" in 1587.
