= Jonathan Appell =

American stonework restorer

Jonathan Appell is a monument and gravestone restoration professional. He is also the CEO of Atlas Preservation and leads the educational 48 State Tour.

== Biography ==
Jonathan Appell working on The Knight's Tombstone.

Appell began as a gravestone installer in the 1980s and moved into preservation after several years. He has worked on restoration and held educational classes on restoration at hundreds of cemeteries across the United States, often as part of his cemetery restoration education effort, the 48 State Tour.

According to the website, the tour is a yearly event in which cemetery restoration events are held in each of the 48 continental states. The concept was to initially achieve this in 48 days but factors such as Covid-19 and scheduling issues have kept him from being able to achieve this until 2024.

== Notable restorations ==
His work has included more notable restoration projects such as:

- Cemetery of the Evergreens - Restoration after hurricane Sandy.
- Frankfort Cemetery - Reconstruction of collapsed marble façade of the Trabue Family Vault, the first settlers in of the state of Kentucky
- Hartford Public Library
- Hill Cemetery
- Longwood Cemetery - repair 40 headstones that were vandalized.
- Mount Olivet Cemetery - Restoration of the Francis Scott Key monument.
- Oakdale Cemetery, Wilmington NC- Restoration of Graham Kenan Vault
- Old Lick Cemetery - restoration of a historic African American cemetery in Roanoke, VA.
- Palasido Cemetery
- Sleepy Hollow Cemetery -
- The Knight’s Tombstone - Appell led the cleaning and restoration efforts for the oldest surviving tombstone in the United States which is believed to belong to Sir George Yeardley. The tombstone is located in Historic Jamestown, Virginia.
