= 48StateTour! =

Annual event teaching stonework restoration

The 48 State Tour (stylized as 48StateTour!) is a yearly event that aims to teach people how to restore cemetery gravestones. The original goal of the tour is to do free restoration events in each of the "Lower 48" states, in 48 days.

The tour was started in 2020 by Jonathan Appell, a professional gravestone and monument restorer, with the goal of traveling to the 48 continental states and holding free events that teach attendees to clean, repair and reset monuments and gravestones.

The tour's website indicates that while the tour has been producing successful events since 2020, the tour reached its goal of successfully executing events in all 48 states in a single tour in 2024. The tour has been sponsored each year by Atlas Preservation.

== Education ==
The 48 State Tour teaches education in gravestone and monument cleaning, repair and conservation techniques. Students sign up for an event held in a local city, then they are shown the appropriate tools to use on different types of stones and the proper cleaning techniques. Students are also shown how to repair stones, use materials like color matching mortar and the correct types of epoxies on stones made of marble, granite and limestone.

== Notable Locations ==
Over the 5 years the tour has been in operation, it has visited sites in each of the 48 continental states at least twice. The tour has visited several African-American cemeteries such as Old Lick Cemetery in Roanoke, Virginia to help with restoration. Some notable locations where events have been held are:

- Frankfort Cemetery
- Green Hill Cemetery in Greensboro, North Carolina.
- Woodland Cemetery in Richmond, Virginia.
- Old City Cemetery in Lynchburg, Virginia.
- St. Andrew's Church (Staten Island)
- Mount Mora Cemetery
- Grove Street Cemetery
- Mount Olivet Cemetery home of Francis Scott Key monument.
