= William West, 1st Baron De La Warr =

English nobleman (c. 1520–1595)

William West

Baron De La Warr
- Born: c. 1520; Warbleton, Sussex
- Died: 30 December 1595; Wherwell, Hampshire
- Spouses: Elizabeth Strange; Anne Swift
- Issue: Thomas West, 2nd Baron De La Warr; Mary West; Jane West; Elizabeth West
- Father: Sir George West
- Mother: Elizabeth Morton

William West, 1st Baron De La Warr (/ˈdɛləwɛər/ DEL-ə-wair) of the second creation (c. 1520 – 30 December 1595) was the elder son of Sir George West (d.1538), second son of Thomas West, 8th Baron De La Warr, by his third wife, Eleanor Copley, and Elizabeth Morton, widow of Robert Walden, and daughter of Sir Robert Morton of Lechlade, Gloucestershire. He was a nephew and adopted heir of his uncle of the half blood, Thomas West, 9th Baron De La Warr, eldest son of the 8th Baron's second wife, Elizabeth Mortimer.

== Inheritance ==
According to Riordan:

[In 1549 the 9th Baron] placed a private bill before parliament to disinherit his nephew William West, first Baron De La Warr (c.1519–1595). The latter was the son of the ninth baron's half-brother Sir George West of Warbleton (d. 1538) and his wife, Elizabeth, daughter of Sir Robert Morton of Lechlade, Gloucestershire. His uncle was childless, and had at some time adopted William as his heir. However, West tried to gain the De La Warr estate early by poisoning his uncle. The attempt was unsuccessful and he was in the Tower by October 1548. He was disinherited by an act of parliament in 1550, although he had been reinstated as heir by the time of his uncle's death.

Despite the fact that he had been reinstated as heir by his uncle, when the latter died in 1554 William West was unable to inherit the barony of De La Warr as a result of the Act of Parliament of 1550 which had deprived him of all honours. Two years later he was involved in the Henry Dudley conspiracy, and on 30 June 1556 was arraigned at the Guildhall on charges of treason, to which he responded as 'William, Lord de la Warr', forcing the heralds to prove during the trial that he was not entitled to the barony and therefore not entitled to a trial by his peers in the House of Lords. He was convicted of treason. However the death sentence was not carried out, and in 1557 he was pardoned by Queen Mary. He fought at the siege of St. Quentin in that year, and in 1563, early in the reign of Queen Elizabeth, was restored in blood. On 5 February 1570 he was knighted, and on the same day created Baron De La Warr, which was regarded as a new creation of the title.

== Peerage ==
West took part as a peer in the trials and convictions of Thomas Howard, 4th Duke of Norfolk and, later, his son, Philip Howard, 20th Earl of Arundel.

He was a junior peer in his lifetime, as the latest created. However, his son and descendants have been seated with the precedence of 1299, as though they had inherited his uncle Thomas's title. By the modern rules of the House of Lords, his uncle's title fell into abeyance between the daughters of William West's second uncle, Sir Owen West, or their heirs; however, as Cokayne notes, such rules are at best modern approximations to actual medieval practice. What seems clear is that some, but not all, writers treat the letters patent as clarifying the descent of the ancient title, rather than creating a new one, hence William is sometimes referred to as 10th baron.

West was succeeded as Baron De La Warr by his son Thomas West, 2nd Baron De La Warr.

== Marriages and issue ==
West married firstly, before 1555, Elizabeth Strange, the daughter of Thomas Strange of Chesterton, Gloucestershire, by whom he had one son and three daughters:

- Thomas West, 2nd Baron De La Warr.
- Mary West, who married Richard Blount, esquire, of Dedisham in Slinfold, Sussex, by whom she had five daughters.
- Jane West, who was married four times:

1. On 9 June 1572, Thomas Wenman, esquire, son and heir of Sir Richard Wenman, by whom she had three sons, Richard Wenman, 1st Viscount Wenman, Sir Thomas Wenman, and Sir Ferdinando Wenman, and a daughter, Elizabeth Wenman, who married Sir Thomas Tredway.
2. James Cressy of Wilton, Buckinghamshire, by whom she had a daughter, Lettice Cressy, who married Sir John Tasburgh.
3. Thomas Tasburgh, esquire, of Hawridge, Buckinghamshire, his second wife, by whom she had no issue.
4. Ralph Sheldon, esquire, of Beoley, Worcestershire (d. March 1613), his second wife.

- Elizabeth West, who died unmarried. She is believed to have had one son out of wedlock:
  - Captain William West, who in his early twenties emigrated to Virginia along with his cousins Thomas West (newly-appointed governor of the colony) and Ferdinando Wainman. Arriving in 1610, Ferdinando died in the summer and William was killed in autumn or winter of the same year by Indians near the falls of the James River. Both were buried in the chancel of the Jamestown Church. He never married and had no issue.

Following his first wife's death, West married Anne Swift after 1579, by whom he had no issue.

== Notes ==
Political offices
Preceded by The Lord Lumley	Lord Lieutenant of Sussex; 1570–1585; With: The Viscount Montagu; The Lord Buckhurst	Succeeded by The Lord Howard of Effingham
Peerage of England
New creation Ultimately Thomas West	Baron De La Warr; 2nd creation 1570–1595	Succeeded by Thomas West
