= Jamestown Church =

Historic church in Virginia, United States

Coordinates: 37°12′30.7″N 76°46′42.2″W

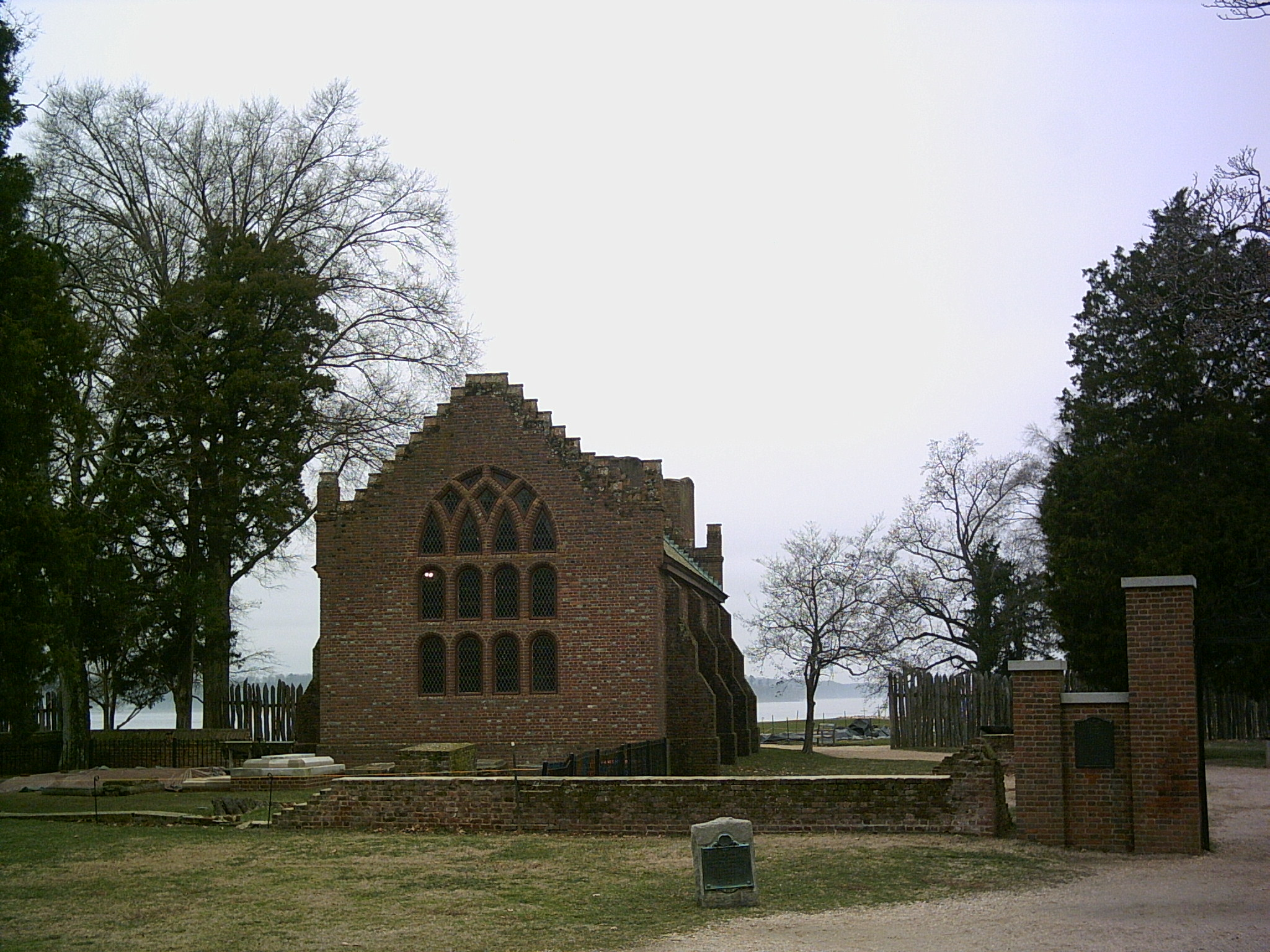
Exterior of the 1907 church (with graveyard in left foreground)

Jamestown Church, also known as the Memorial Church, constructed in brick from 1639 onward, in Jamestown in the Mid-Atlantic state of Virginia, is one of the oldest surviving building remnants built by Europeans in the original Thirteen Colonies and in the United States overall. It is now part of Historic Jamestown, and is owned by Preservation Virginia (formerly known as the Association for the Preservation of Virginia Antiquities). There have been several sites and stages in the church's history, and its later tower is now the last surviving above-ground structure from the days when Jamestown was the capital of Virginia. The current structure, active as part of the Continuing Anglican movement, is still in use today. The ruins are currently being researched by members of the Jamestown Rediscovery project.

== Background ==
The established religion in England at the time of the colony's founding was the Church of England, whose basic doctrines and worship services were set out in the Book of Common Prayer. The Jamestown settlers naturally brought their religion with them and practised it in Virginia. The Church of England was central to the lives of the London Company leadership, with all of the men required to take an oath acknowledging the supremacy of King James and the lack of authority over him by the Pope before they set sail to Virginia. There was no separation of church and state in 17th-century England, or in any other European country. Despite the de facto requirement for Jamestown colonists to be members of the Protestant Church of England, archaeological discoveries of Catholic artifacts at the Jamestown site have led to speculation that at least a few of the early Jamestown settlers may have been crypto-Catholic.

Church services in James Fort were held fourteen times a week, with sermons preached at services on Sunday and on either Wednesday or Thursday. Two prayer services, one in the morning and one in the evening, were held Monday through Saturday. An afternoon catechism was also held by the minister on Sunday. After the introduction of strict martial law by Deputy Governor Sir Thomas Dale in 1611, called Dale's Code, regular church attendance was required, with punishments ranging from loss of food rations to execution for violators who blasphemed "God's holy name" or challenged the authority of a preacher or minister.

== History ==
Digital model of the second church in relation to the current structure.

As a result of detailed surveys of the site by Jamestown Rediscovery, six churches are believed to have been built on two different sites at James Fort. Churches 1-2 were located inside the confines of the original fort, whereas Churches 3-6 were built nearby on the current site, located within the extended wall area of the original fort. The oldest surviving visible section of any structure is the tower, usually dated sometime in the mid 17th century.

=== The first church ===
Captain John Smith reported that the first church services were held outdoors "under an awning (which was an old saile)" fastened to three or four trees. Shortly thereafter the settlers built the first church inside the fort in 1607. Smith said it was "a homely thing like a barn set on crachetts, covered with rafts, sedge and earth." This church soon burned down in the fires of January 7, 1608.

=== The second church ===
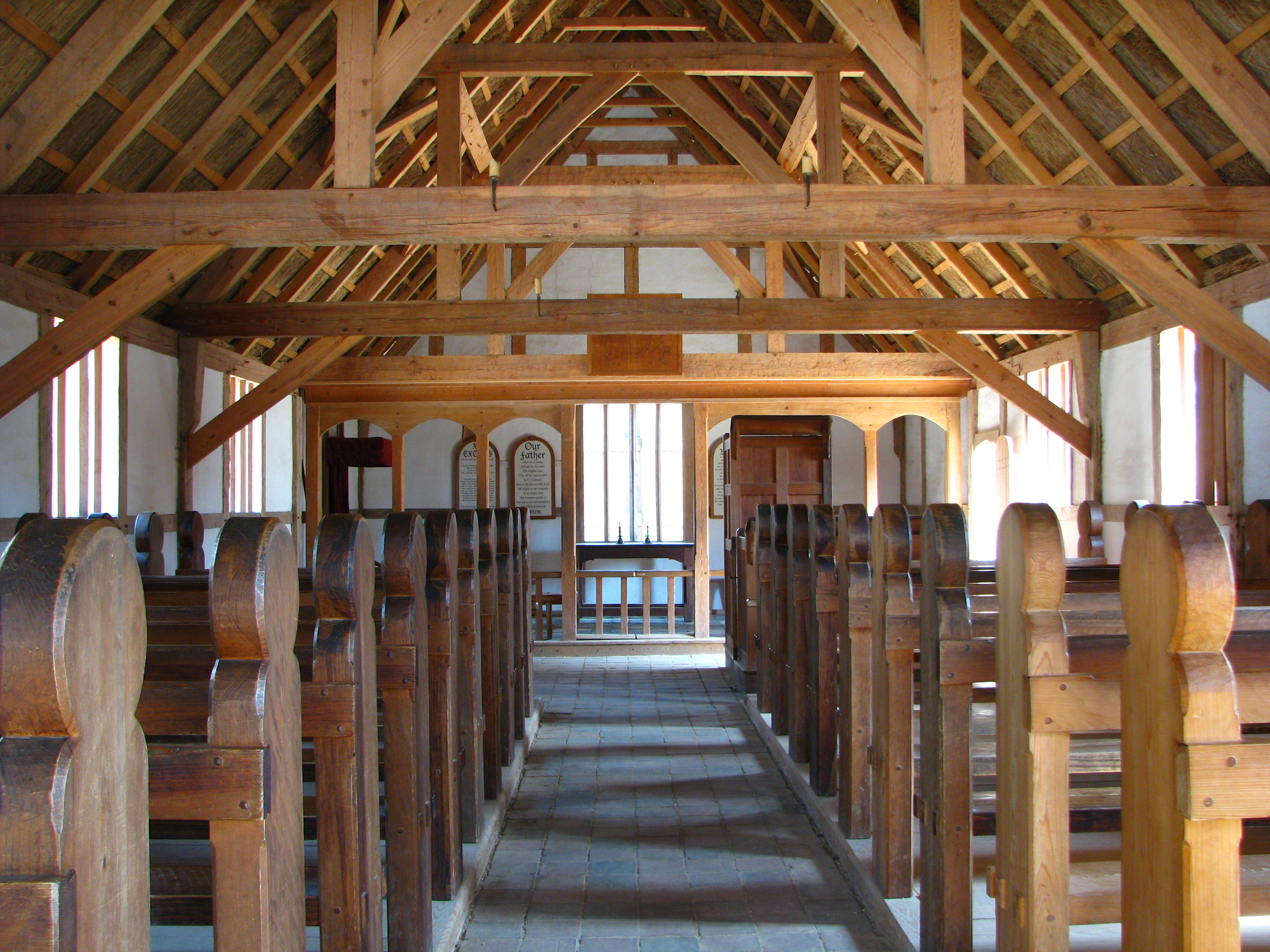
Interior of the recreated second church

In 2010, archaeologists discovered the site of the second church constructed at Jamestown. It was similar to the first, and built on the same site, but being made of wood, it needed constant repair. When Lord De La Warr arrived as governor in 1610, he found that the church had fallen into a sad state of disrepair, so he had it restored and its furnishings improved. This is the site where on April 5, 1614, Pocahontas married John Rolfe. There is a reconstruction of the second church at Jamestown Settlement.

=== The third church ===
In 1617–1619 when Samuel Argall was governor, he had the inhabitants build a new church "50-foot long and twenty foot broad." Situated nearby the old church, it was wooden and built on a one-foot-wide foundation of cobblestones capped by a wall one brick thick (which are visible under the glass on the floor of the present building). It was in this church where the first Representative Legislative Assembly met, which convened there on July 30, 1619.

=== The fourth church ===
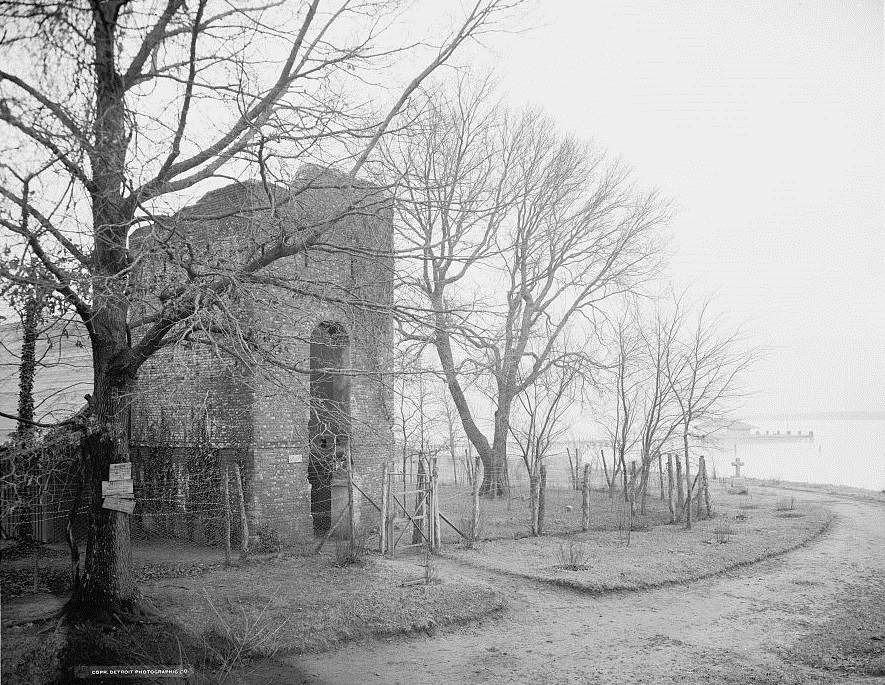
Remains of the brick tower (photographed c. 1900)

In January 1639 Governor John Harvey reported that he, the council, the ablest planters, and some sea captains "had contributed to the building of a brick church" at Jamestown. This church was slightly larger than the third church and was built around it over the next few years. It was still unfinished in November 1647 when efforts were made to complete it. It was burned during Bacon's Rebellion on September 19, 1676.

==== The church tower ====
Around this time (sometime between 1639 [though possibly earlier] and 1700) a brick church tower was added to an existing church building over two distinctly different stages. Once completed, it was about 46 feet (14 meters) high with a wooden roof, belfry and two upper floors. In 1699 the churchwardens of James City Parish asked Virginia's General Assembly for money to pay for the "steeple of their church, and towards the repairing of the church". A visitor in 1702 said the Jamestown church had "a tower and a bell". In the 1890s, the tower was strengthened shortly after being acquired by Preservation Virginia.

=== The fifth church ===
Ten years later (c. 1686) a fifth church was functioning, probably using the walls and foundations of the fourth church. This church was used until the 1750s when it was abandoned in favor of a new church constructed some three miles from Jamestown. Although the tower remained, the building fell into ruins by the 1790s when the bricks were re-purposed to build the graveyard wall.

=== The sixth church ===
The present Memorial Church was built by the National Society of the Colonial Dames of America in 1907 and re-used the original tower. It was built just outside the cobblestone foundations of the older 1617 church and the brick foundations of the 1639 church. It was designed by Edmund M. Wheelwright of Boston. The design is derived from the nearby St. Luke's Church, a similar church surviving from 1682 (though at the time thought to be 1632, thus contemporary to the Jamestown Church). It was dedicated on May 13, 1907.

Inside the new building, on the walls are numerous plaques in commemoration of various seventeenth-century figures, including Captain John Smith, Pocahontas, Chanco, John Rolfe, Lord de la Warr, Captain Edwin Maria Wingfield, William Claiborne (treasurer of the colony), John Pott (a physician), and the first poet in America, George Sandys. The introduction of common law is also memorialized on one of the plaques. The restored furnishings in the chancel were of seventeenth-century design, although no specific models were used.

== Burials ==
=== Inside the churches ===
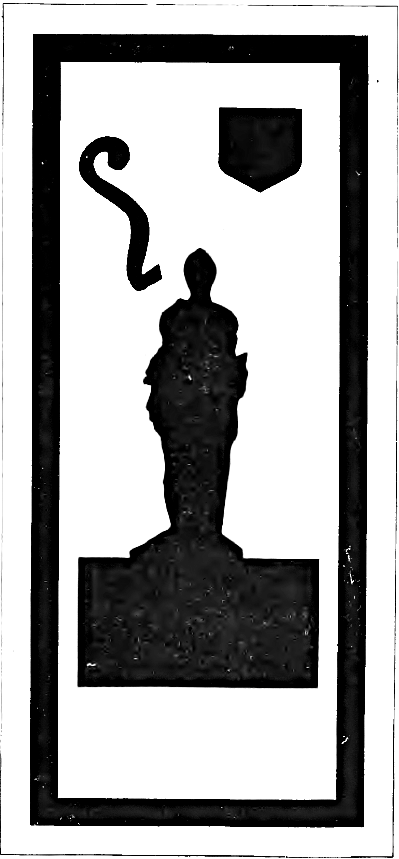
"Knight's Tombstone" etching, showing depressions which contained now-lost bronze inlays

In July 2015, the remains of four early figures of the colony were identified by the Jamestown Rediscovery/Smithsonian team in the chancel area of the second church. The four have been tentatively identified as Rev. Robert Hunt (thought to be the first Anglican minister in the Americas); Capt. Gabriel Archer; Sir Ferdinando Wainman (the first English knight to be buried in America); and Capt. William West. West and Wainman were both nephews of Thomas West, Lord De La Warr, the colonial governor of Virginia at the time of their deaths.

Originally located in the chancel of the third church was the "Knight's Tombstone", a ledger stone of Belgian black limestone, which had brass inlays including the figure of a knight. The associated burial is believed to be that of either Lord De La Warr or George Yeardley, his successor as governor. The case for it belonging to Yeardley is reinforced by the will of Adam Thorowgood, a relative of Yeardley, who stated in his 1680 will that he would like to have a tombstone of marble with the coat of arms of Sir George Yeardley and himself, with the same inscription as on the Knight's Tomb.

=== Outside the churches ===
By the early 1690s, the graveyard area around the brick church covered about 1.5 acres, extending through the ruins of James Fort, and under the future Confederate fort. The earliest suspected burial was in the 1640s, and the latest known was in May 1807 during the bicentennial event. In total, there were "probably several hundred burials in the original graveyard" with another 50 or so in the region enclosed by the brick wall (built by John Ambler and William Lee in the early 1790s using bricks from the old, ruined church).

The other main burial ground in the area is about 250 yards (230 meters) to the west, near the large wooden Memorial Cross by the Archaearium and Statehouse ruins. There are "perhaps 300 graves" there, probably dating from the earliest times, all without tombstones.

== Excavation and restoration ==
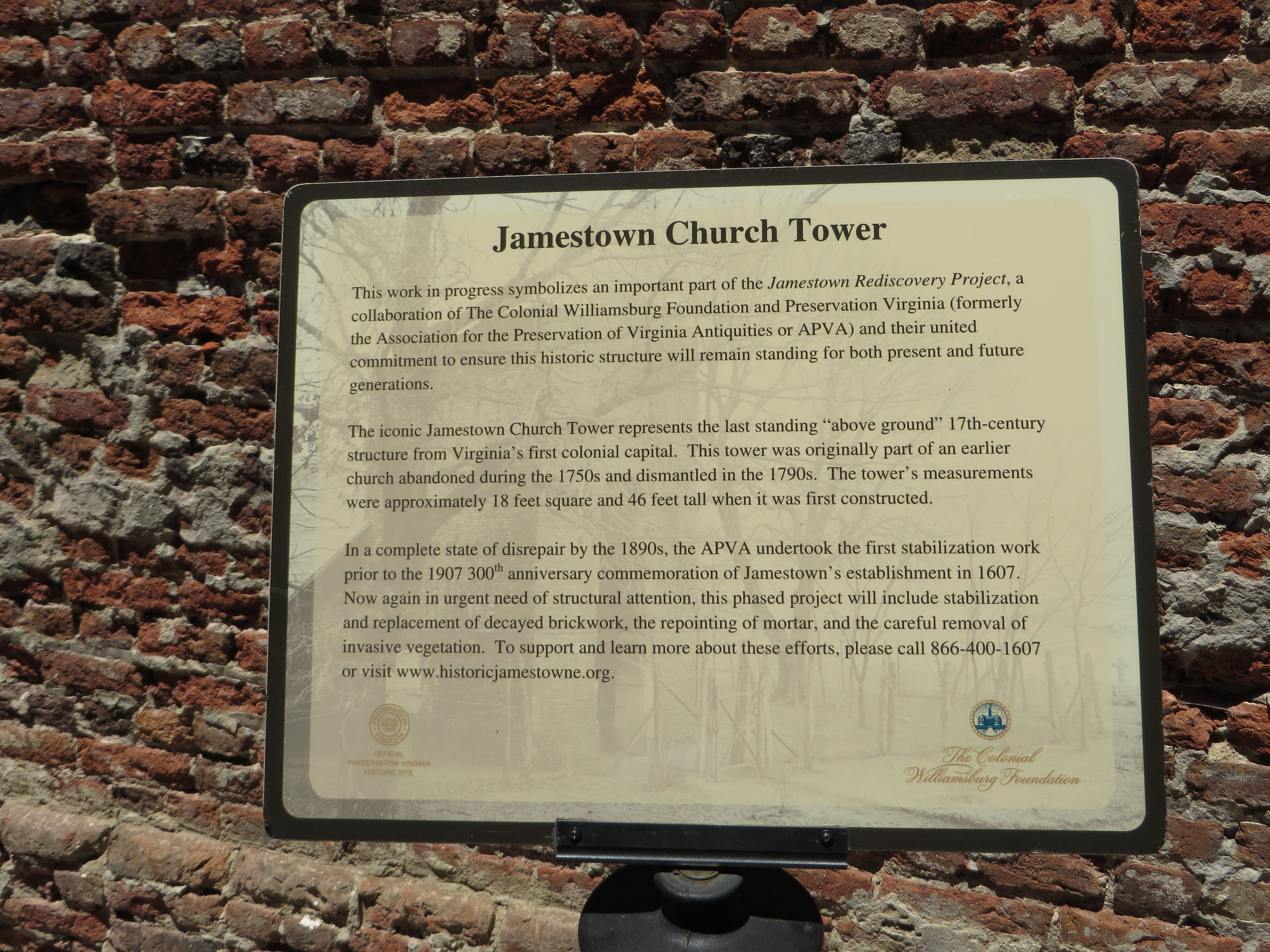
Information board at the church, 2014

The area around the church has been gradually cleared of trees and other vegetation to enable archaeological access to the site. Further, a brick wall in front of the church, as well as iron gates, have been removed as well. In 2010, the combined remains of Churches 1 and 2 were discovered by Jamestown Rediscovery archaeologists.

A major rehabilitation project in 2013 and 2014 helped to preserve the tower by repairing, relaying, and occasionally replacing bricks. About 5,000 bricks made by craftsmen at the Colonial Williamsburg Foundation were used. The replacement bricks were actually produced on-site using local materials and traditional methods. The project was part of the collaboration between Preservation Virginia and the Colonial Williamsburg Foundation for the operation of Historic Jamestowne.

In the summer of 2016 Summer Field School project members helped out at the Jamestown Rediscovery Lab to uncover artifacts from around the site of the brick church. At the end of November 2016, archaeologists from Jamestown Rediscovery started excavations inside the church to prepare for the 400th anniversary of the first meeting of the General Assembly in July 2019.

== In Literature ==
Lydia Sigourney published her poem First Church at Jamestown, Virginia, with added descriptive text, in her volume Scenes in my Native Land, 1845.

== Gallery ==
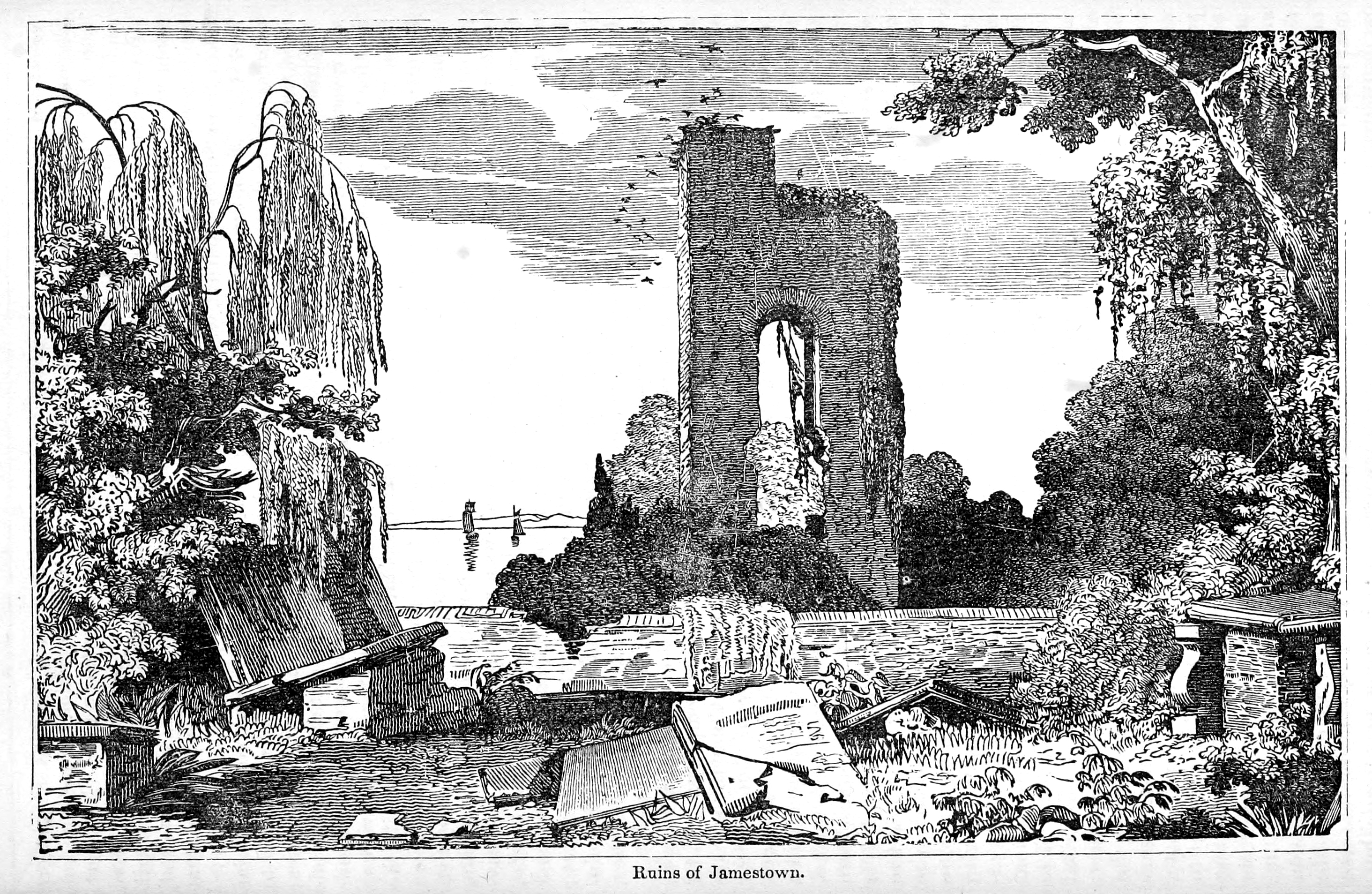
1854 image of the ruins of Jamestown

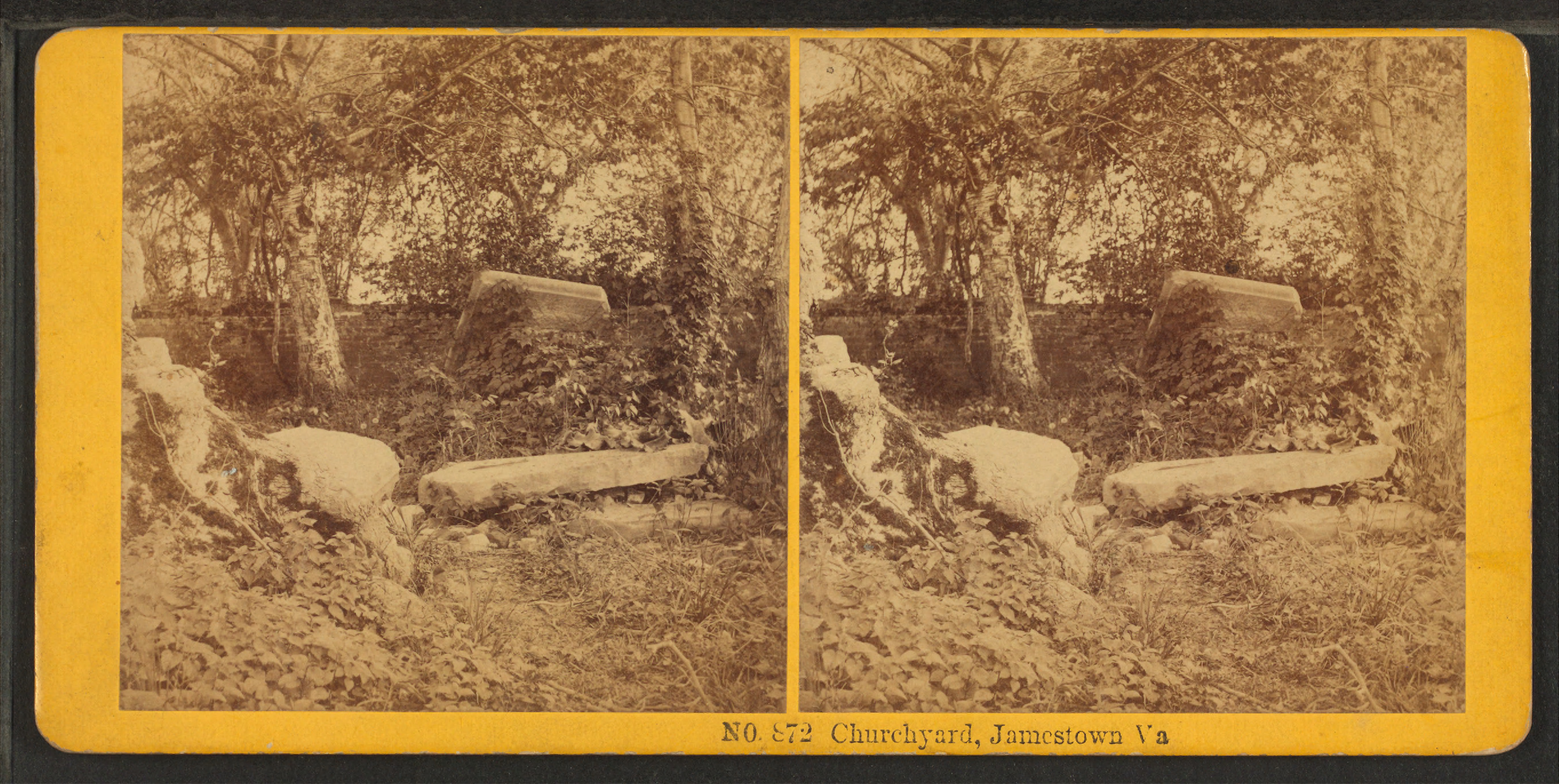
Derelict church yard - Stereoscopic image by Kilburn brothers.

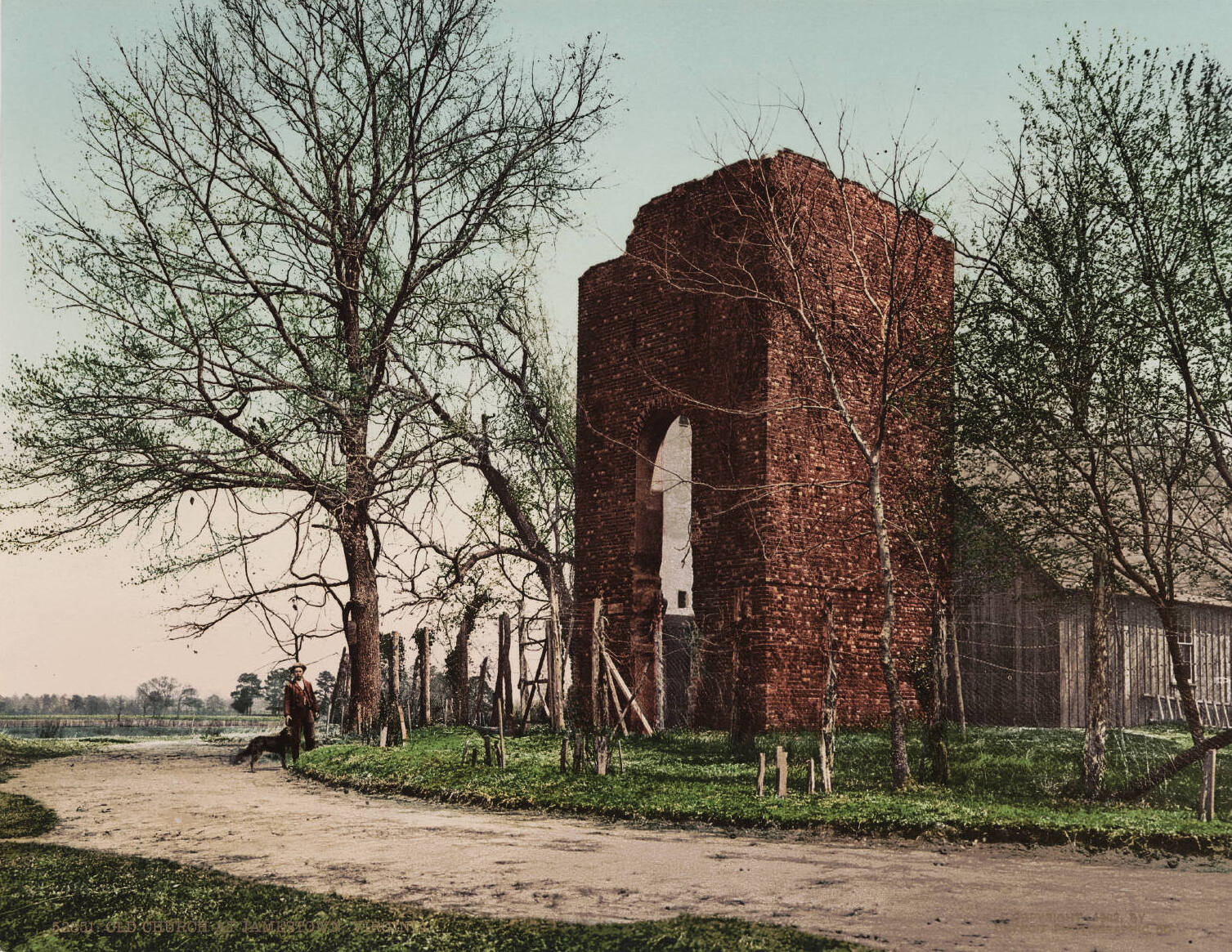
View of the tower, ca. 1902

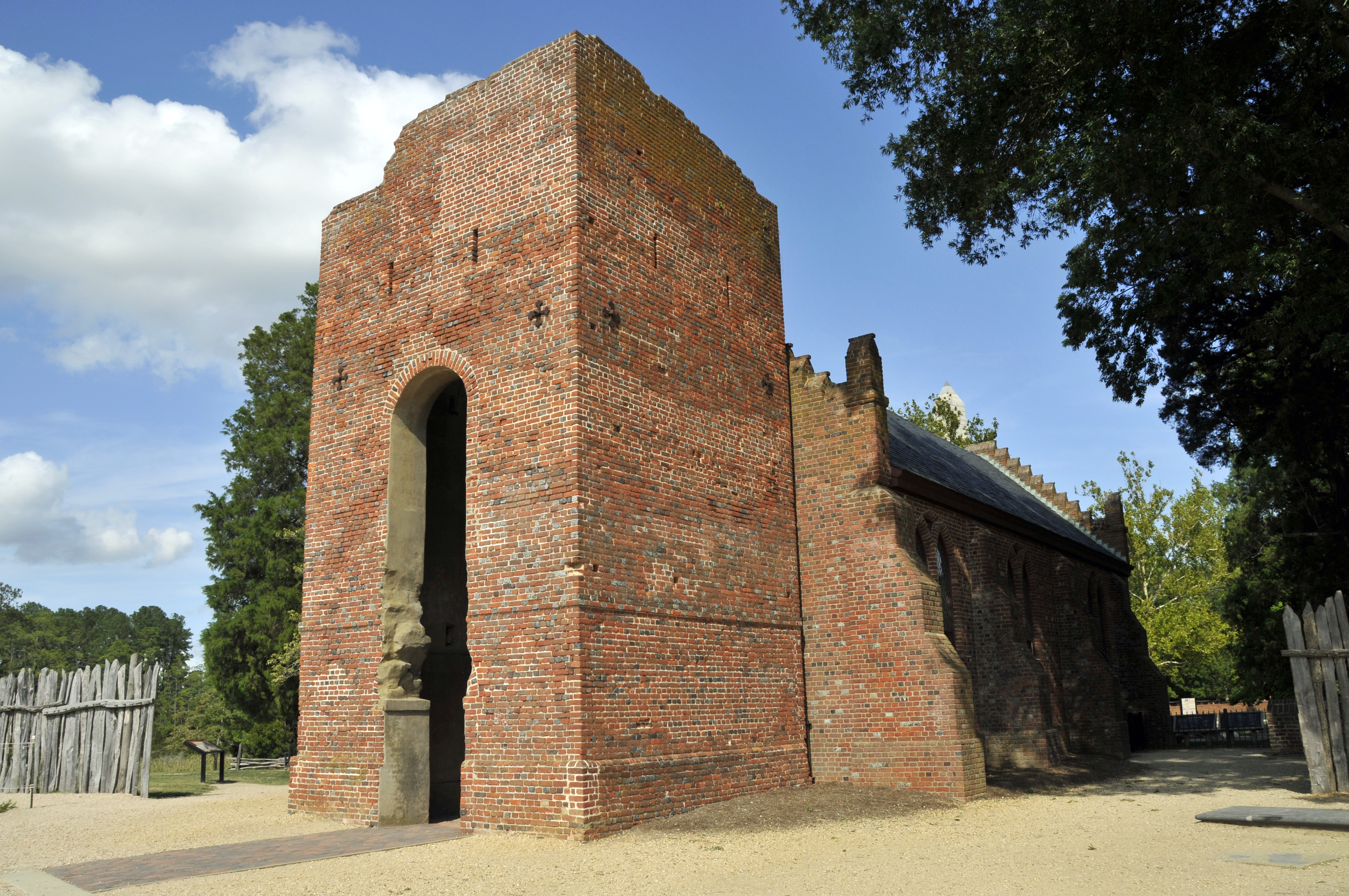
Current view of the rebuilt 1907 church

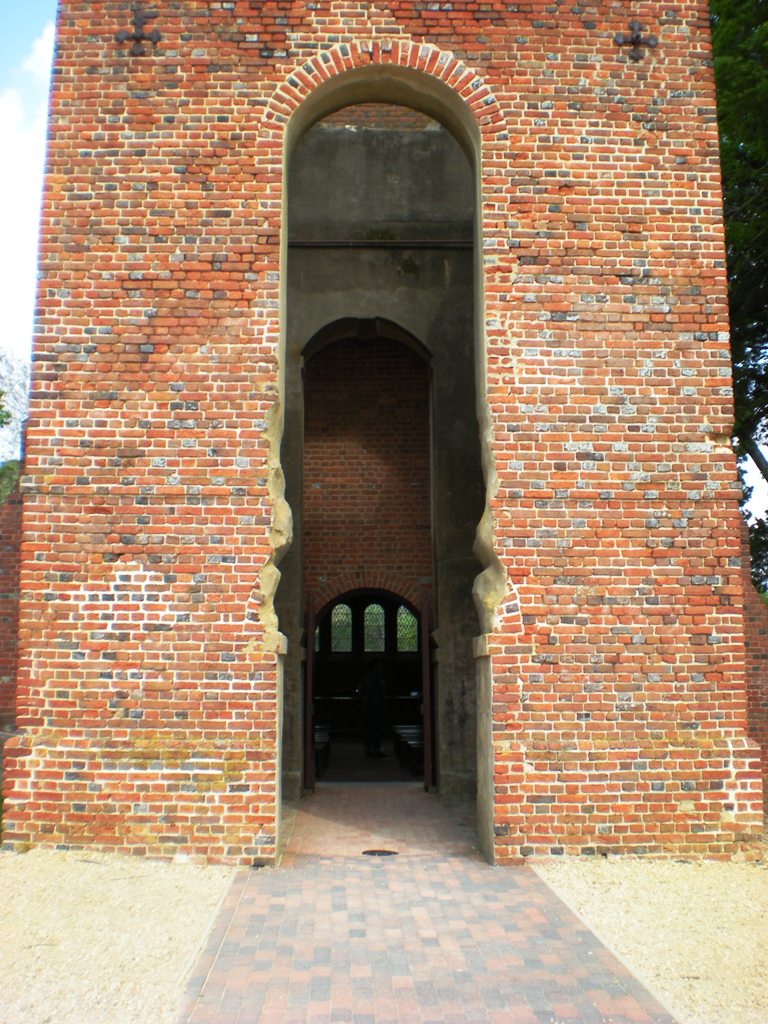
Frontal view of the entrance

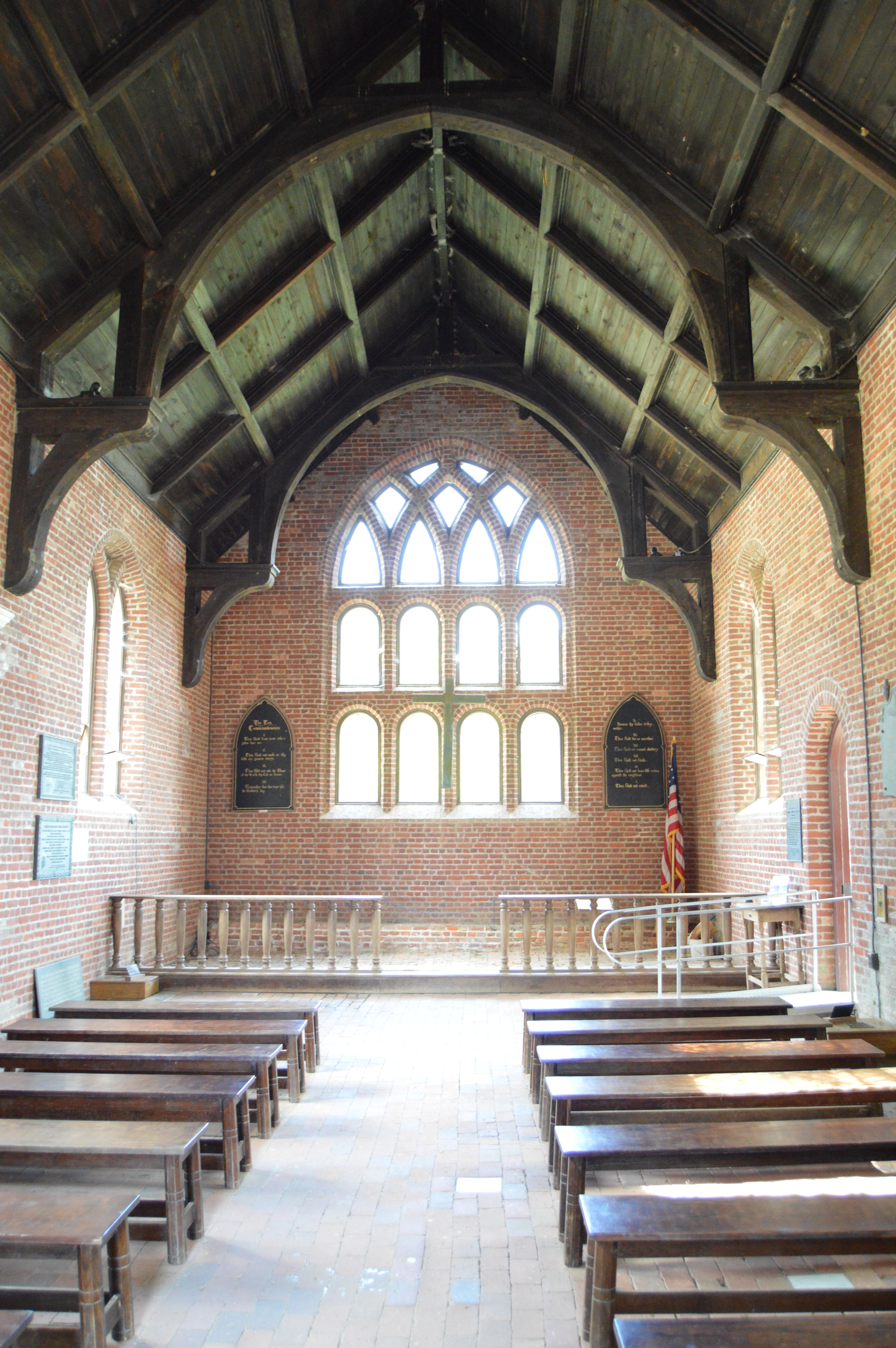
The interior of the 1907 church

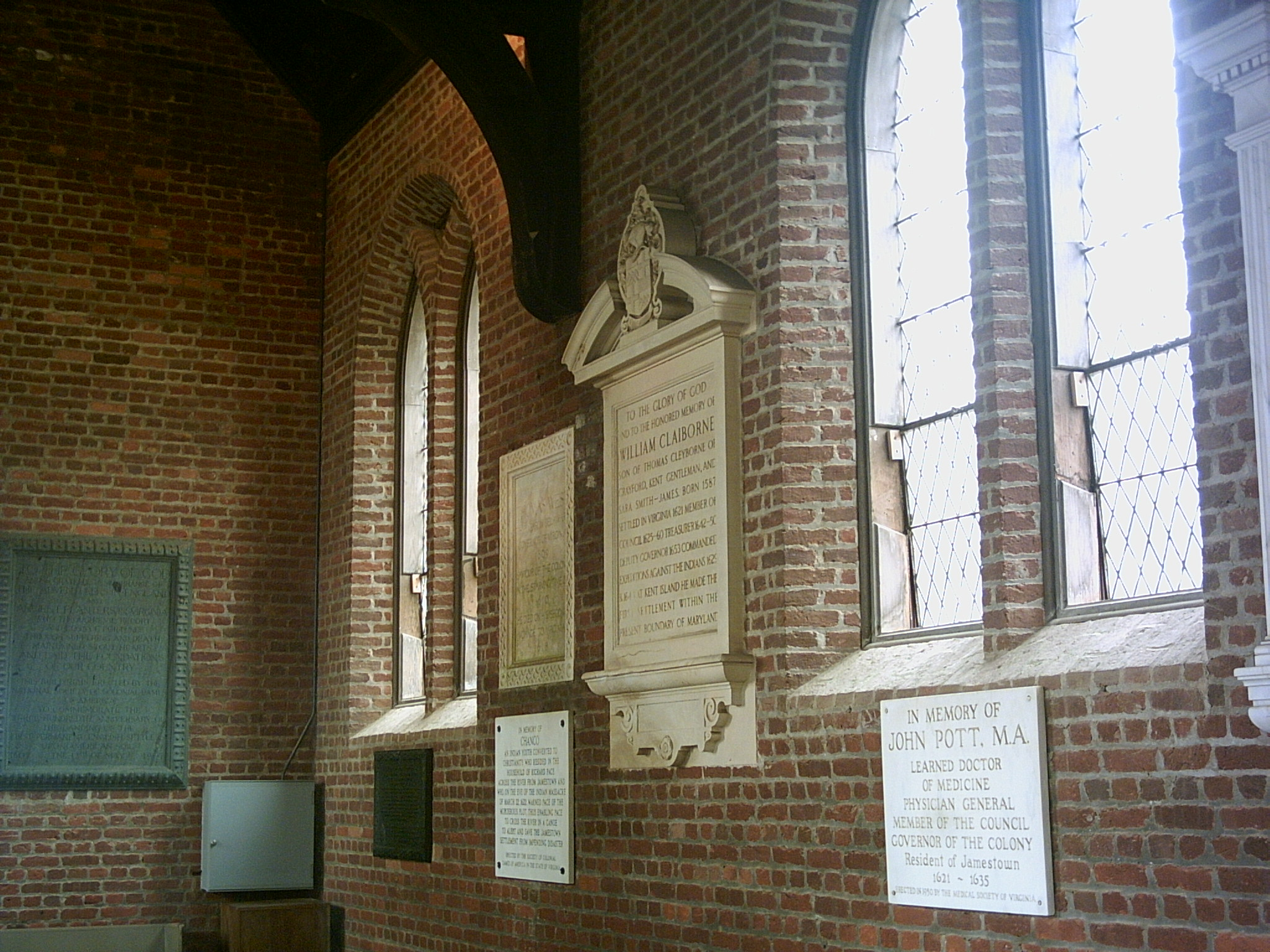
Interior of the 1907 church showing memorial plaques

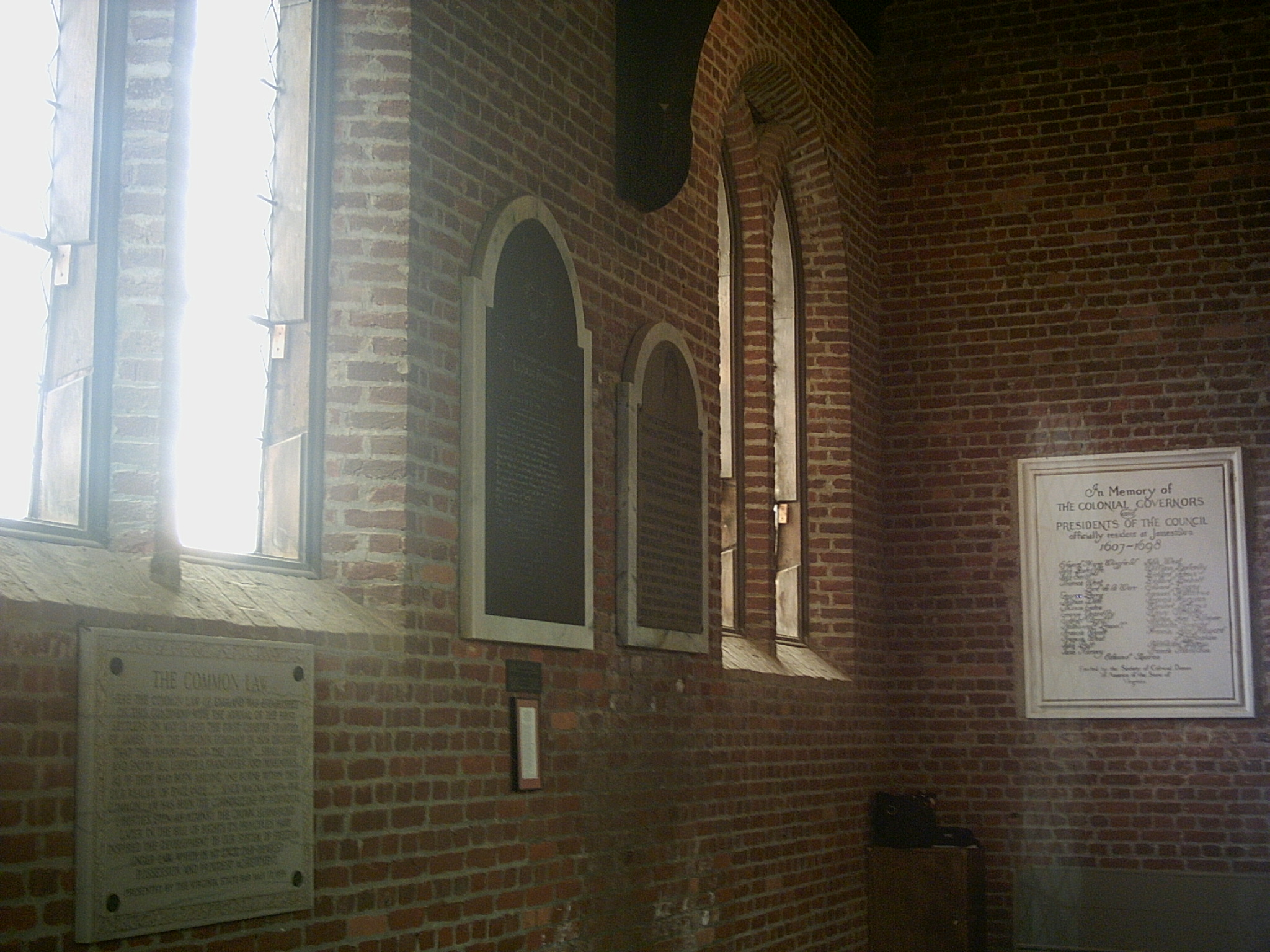
More memorial plaques in the church

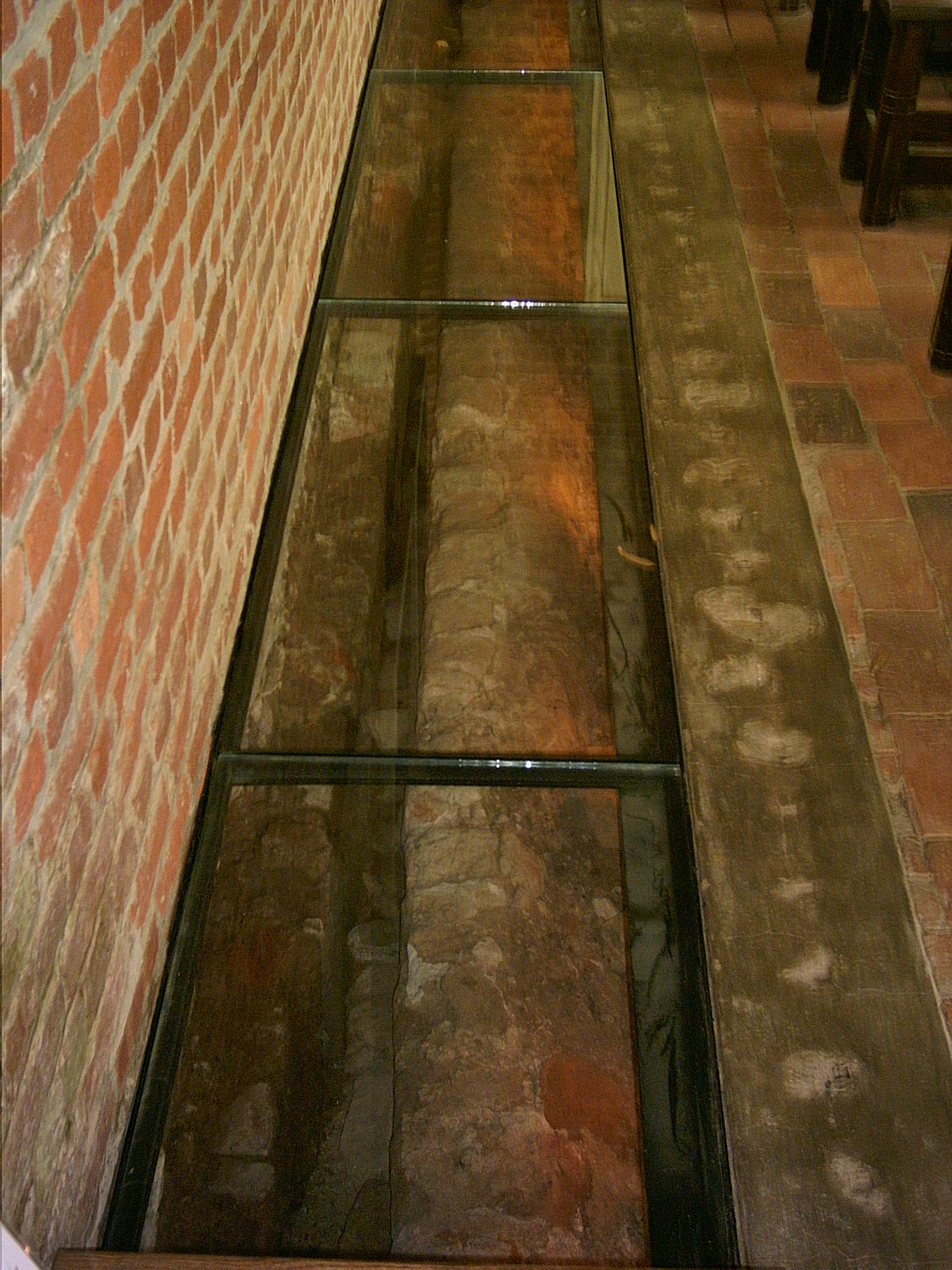
Foundations of the older churches, seen through glass in the floor

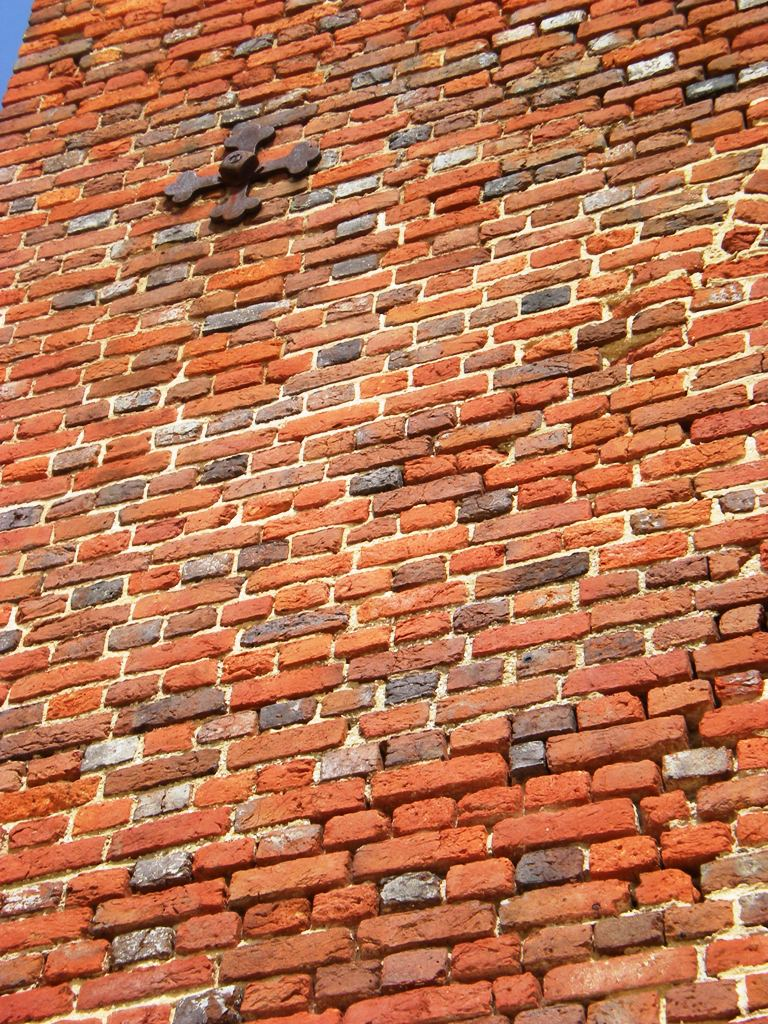
Closeup of the tower brickwork

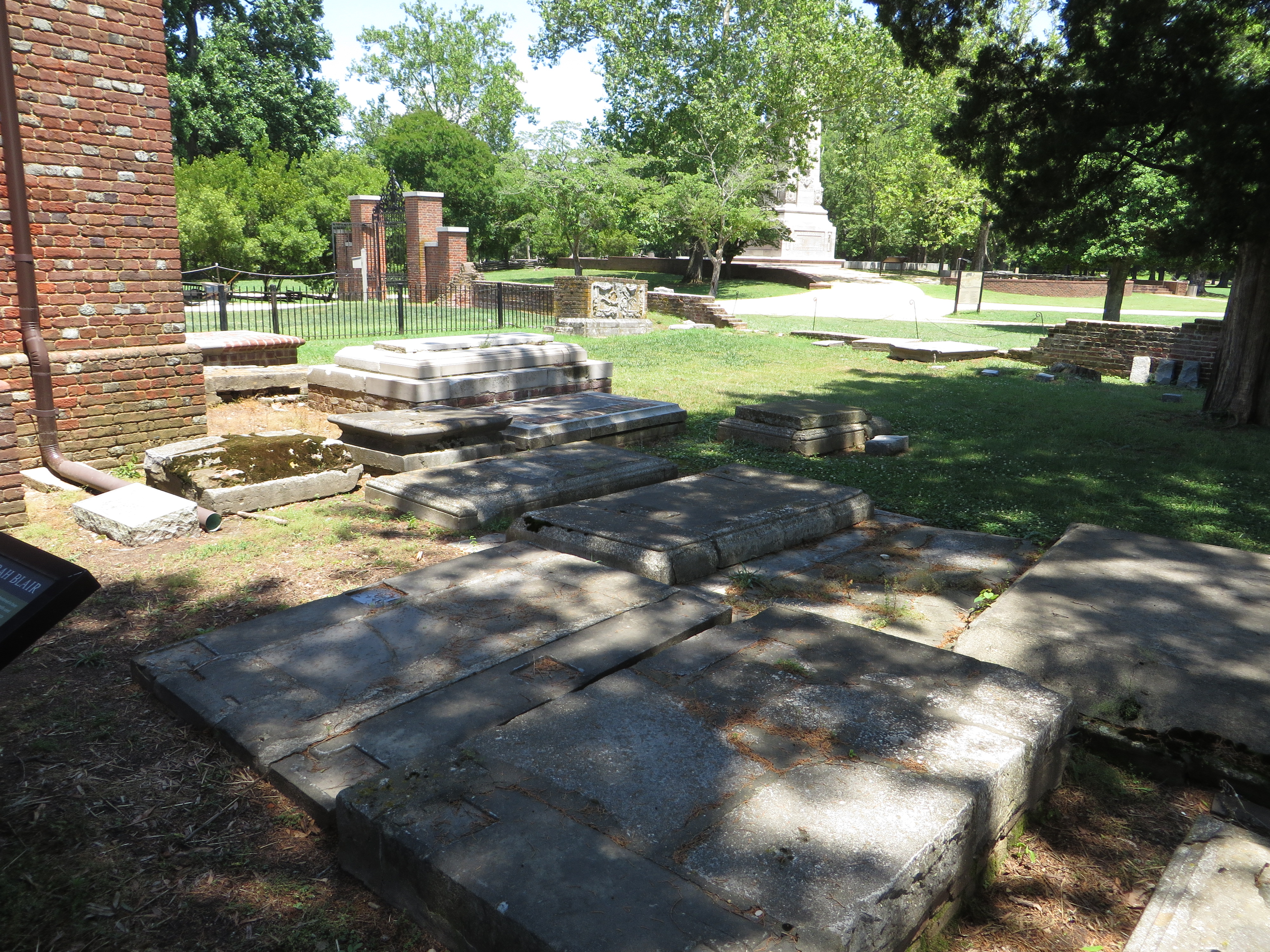
Graveyard at the church

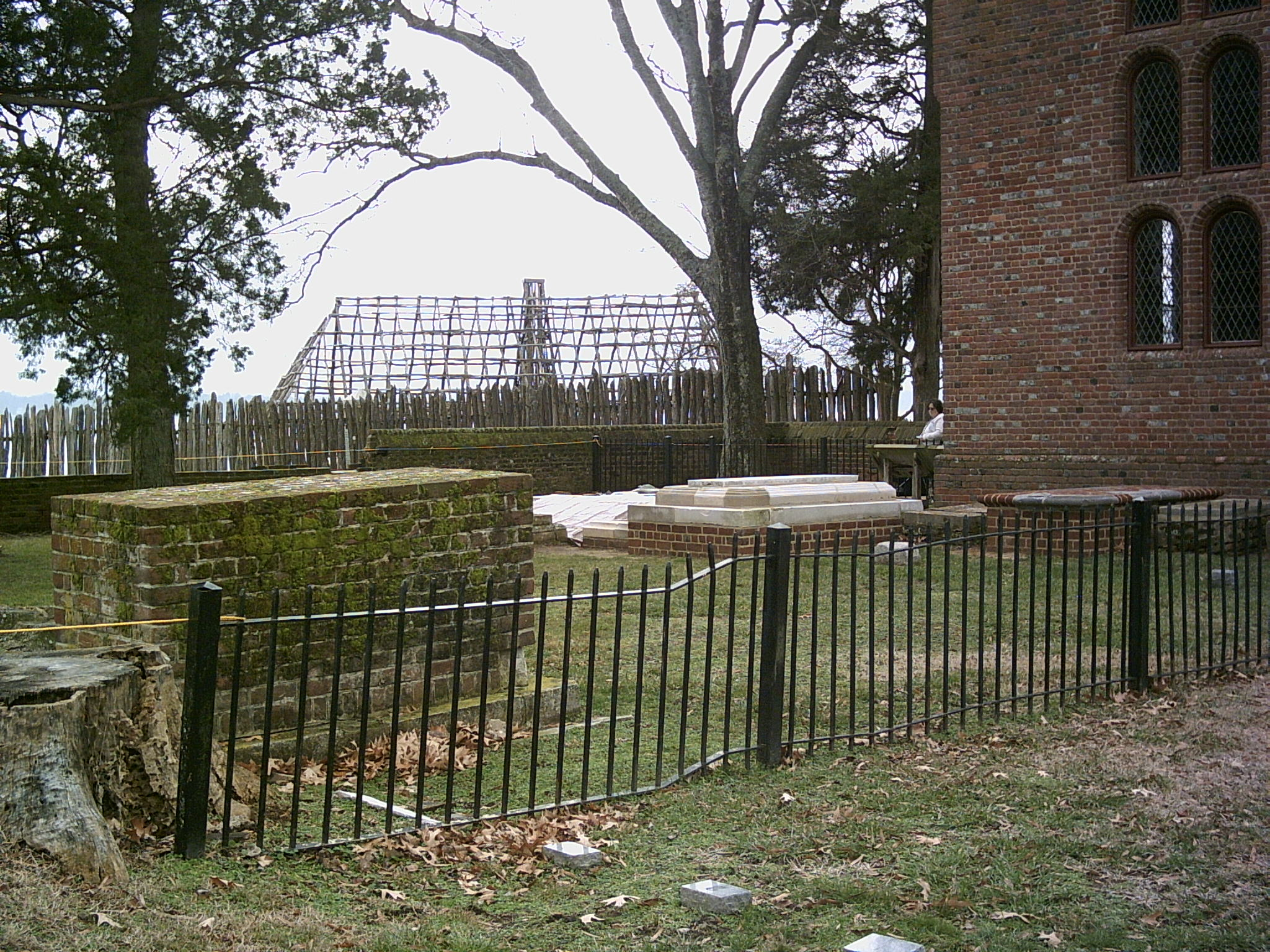
Graveyard at the church

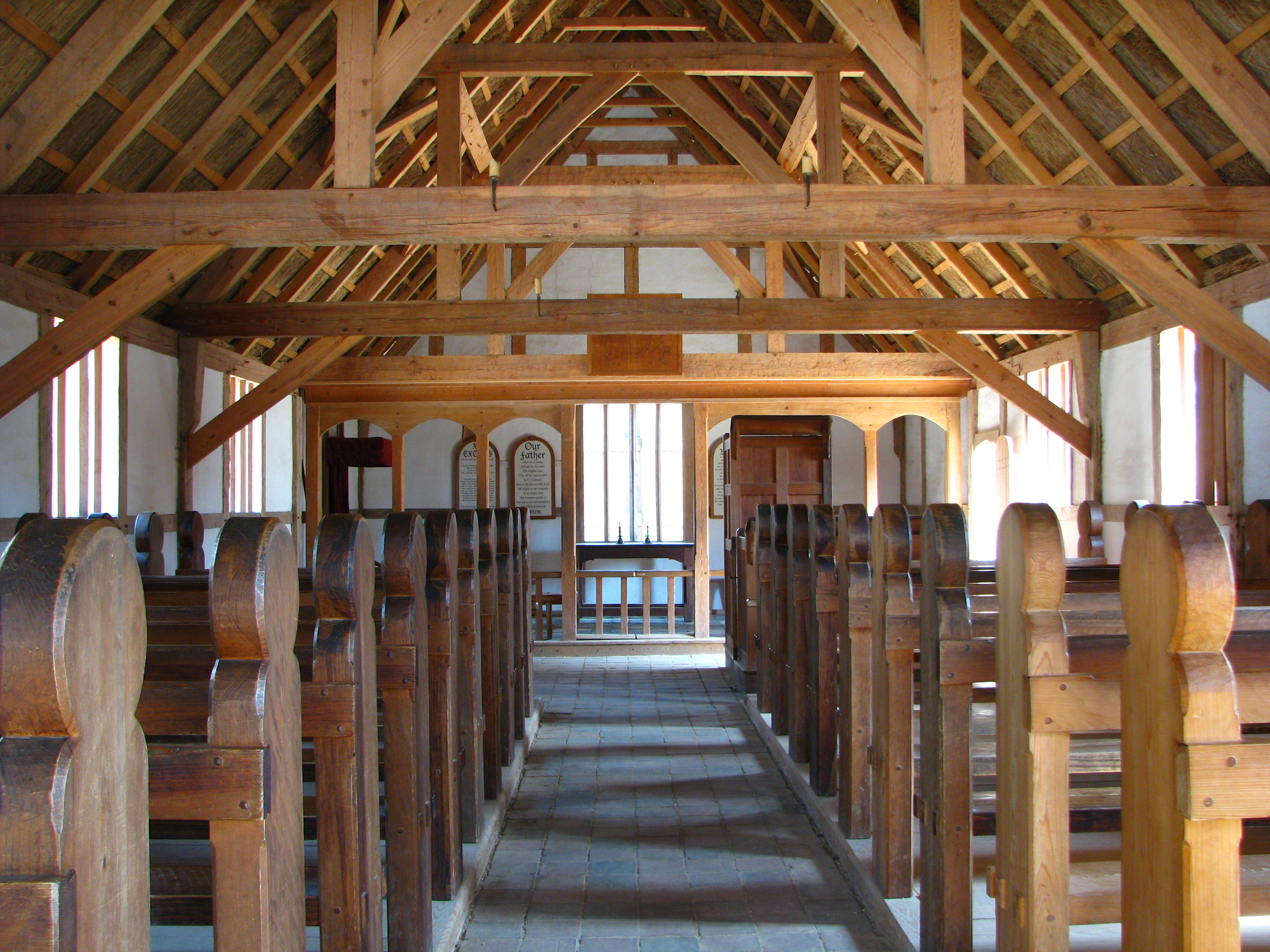
Interior of the reconstructed second Jamestown church at Jamestown Settlement

== See also ==
- Oldest churches in the United States
- Oldest buildings in the United States
