= Ferdinando Wainman =

English colonist of America (1576 – 1610)

Sir Ferdinando Wainman
- Born: 1576; Oxfordshire, England
- Died: 1610 (aged 33–34); Jamestown, Virginia Colony
- Other name: Ferdinand Wenman [sic]
- Education: Balliol College, Oxford
- Title: Master of the Ordnance; Member of the Virginia Governor's Council
- Board member of: Virginia Company of London
- Spouse: Frances Wainman
- Children: 1
- Relatives: Thomas Wenman (father); Jane West (mother); Richard Wenman, 1st Viscount Wenman (brother); William West, 1st Baron De La Warr (grandfather); Thomas West, 3rd Baron De La Warr (cousin)

Ferdinando Wainman (1576 – 1610) (also spelled Waynman, Wenman, or Weynman) was an English colonist, investor in the Virginia Company of London, and politician who served briefly as the Master of the Ordnance of the Colony of Virginia and a member of the Virginia Governor's Council. He was the first English knight to be buried in America.

== Biography ==
Wainman was born in 1576 in Oxfordshire, England, youngest son of Thomas Wainman, who served in the House of Commons of the United Kingdom, and his second wife, Jane West. His maternal grandfather was William West, 1st Baron De La Warr. He matriculated at a young age at the University of Oxford, where he was a student of John Case, a noted philosopher and scholar of the time. He received his Bachelor of Arts degree from Balliol College, Oxford.

By 1609, Wainman received a knighthood. On June 9, 1610, Wainman arrived at the Jamestown settlement in the colony of Virginia, accompanying his cousin Thomas West, 3rd Baron De La Warr on the two-month journey. Wainman was involved in the political and business affairs of the colony, including as an active investor in the Virginia Company and member of the governor's council of his cousin. Three days after his arrival, he was also appointed master of the ordnance (artillery) and as "General of the Horse," placed in charge of the colony's horse troops and defense.

== Death and legacy ==
Wainman died in July or August 1610 from disease, around age 34. He was interred in the church at Jamestown, becoming the first English knight to be buried in America.

Historians have credited Wainman for his contributions to bring fresh supplies which aided the colony following the "Starving Time." He is the subject of a documentary tiled, Unveiling Jamestown’s Lost Knight: The Mystery of Sir Ferdinando Wainman's Grave.

=== Discovery of remains ===
A 2015 archeological excavation sponsored by Jamestown researchers and the Smithsonian Institution verified the identify of the remains of Wainman.
