= Jamestown Settlement =

Coordinates: 37°13′21.90″N 76°47′10.43″W

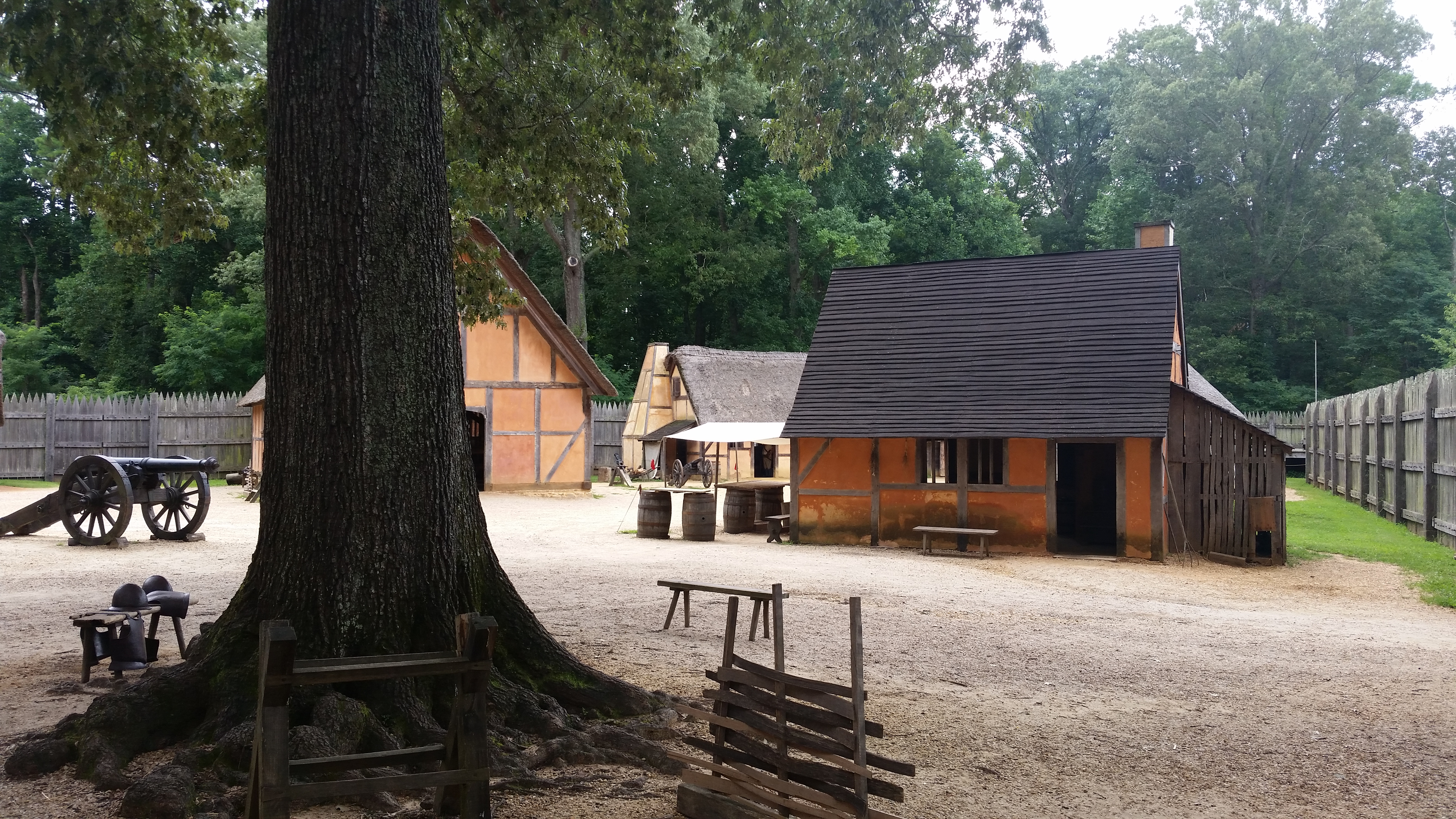
- Recreated interior of James Fort
- Established: 1957
- Location: Williamsburg (near Jamestown, Virginia)
- Type: Living history museum
- Public transit access: Williamsburg Area Transit Authority Route 6
- Website: Official website

Jamestown Settlement is a living history museum operated by the Commonwealth of Virginia, created in 1957 as Jamestown Festival Park for the 350th anniversary celebration. Today it includes a recreation of James Fort, a Powhatan Native American town, indoor and outdoor displays, and replicas of the original settlers' ships: the Susan Constant, Godspeed, and Discovery.

The museum complex is located adjacent to Jamestown Island and Historic Jamestowne, which is run in partnership by the National Park Service and the Jamestown Rediscovery Foundation, a private nonprofit branch of Preservation Virginia dedicated to the archaeological mission. Historic Jamestowne is established in the original James Fort and Jamestown Colony, the first successful English settlement on the mainland of North America, founded on May 14, 1607. Colonial Williamsburg and The American Revolution Museum in Yorktown, additional living history sites, follow the next centennial of Virginian and American history up to the American Civil War. The Colonial Parkway connects all of these sites. The Jamestown-Yorktown Foundation is a Virginia state agency that administers the education aspects of the Jamestown Settlement as well as the Yorktown battlefield and the Revolution.

== Background ==
Late in the 18th century, Jamestown became the focus of renewed historical interest and efforts at preservation. In 1893, a portion of the island was donated to Preservation Virginia for that purpose, including the ruined church tower. In the early 1900s, a seawall was constructed with the intention of preserving the site around the original "James Fort", even though the actual location of the original 1607 fort was thought to be underwater and lost to erosion. In 1907, the Jamestown Exposition was held to mark the 300th anniversary of the founding of Jamestown, but the celebration was held at Sewell's Point in Norfolk, Virginia on the harbor of Hampton Roads, due to transportation and other considerations. The area came back into national prominence with the creation of the Colonial National Historical Park in 1940 and the uncovering of the old fort in 1996 by archaeologists of the Jamestown Rediscovery project.

== Jamestown Festival Park ==
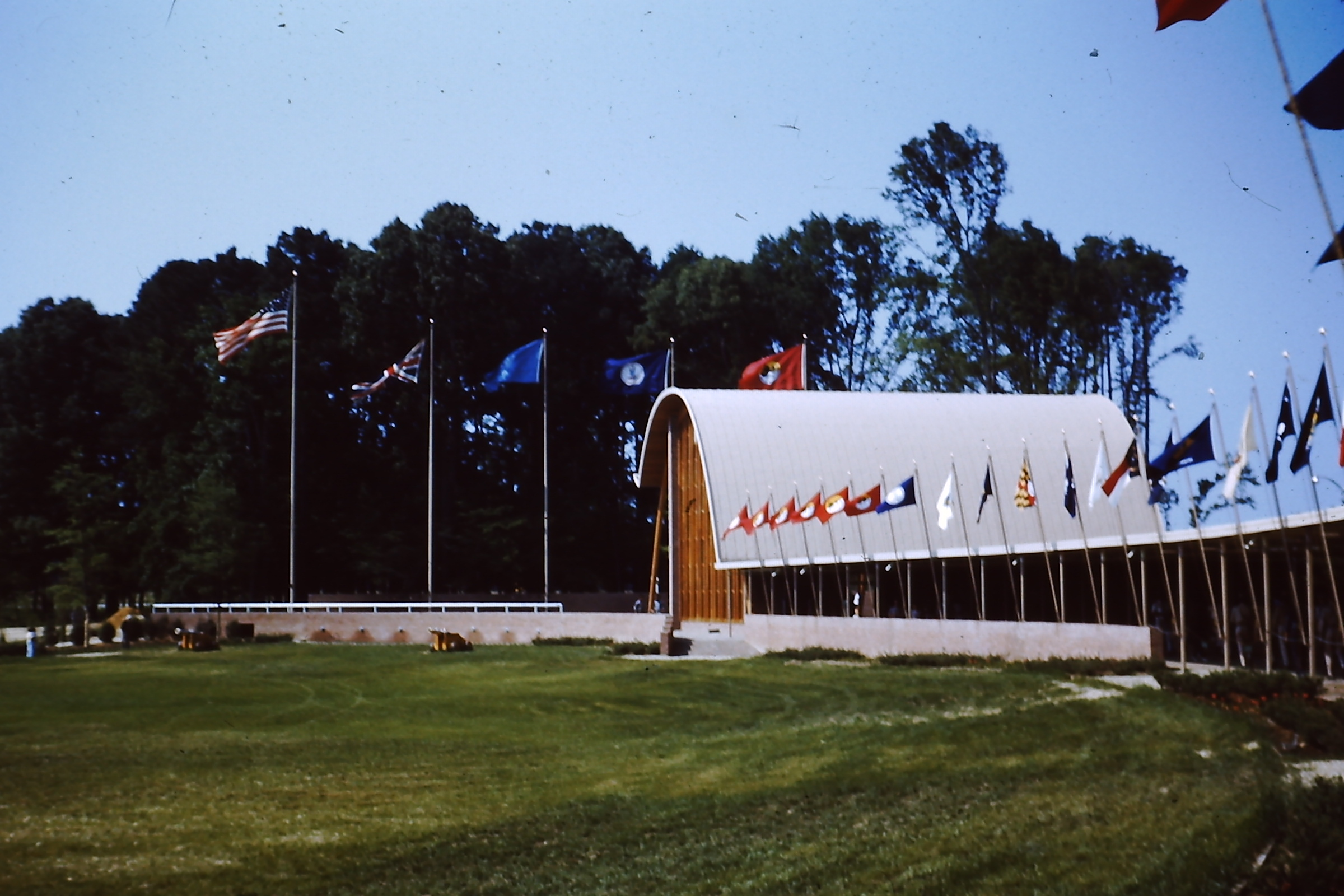
Exposition Hall built for the 350th anniversary in 1958 (since replaced for the 400th anniversary)

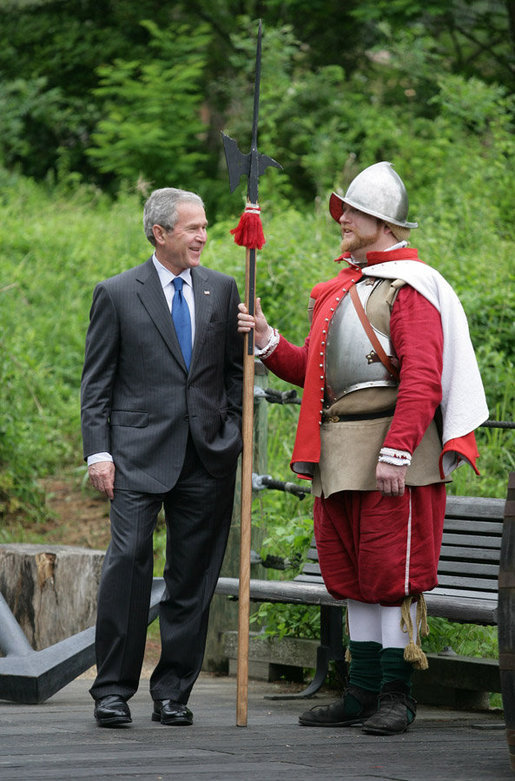
Former President George W. Bush speaks to a reenactor during the Jamestown 2007 event

A return to Jamestown itself was considered feasible by 1957, in time for the 350th anniversary of the founding of the London Company settlement at Jamestown. Attractions were developed by the National Park Service and the Commonwealth of Virginia which included the reconstructed Glasshouse, the Memorial Cross, and the visitors center. The National Park Service's Colonial Parkway was also completed in April 1957 linking the Historic Triangle of Jamestown, Williamsburg, and Yorktown, including the construction of a land bridge to Jamestown Island.

The 1957 celebrations continued from April 1 to November 30 with more than one million participants, including dignitaries and politicians such as the British ambassador and U.S. vice president Richard Nixon. Full-sized replicas were constructed of the three ships that brought the colonists: the Susan Constant, Godspeed, and Discovery. They were built at a shipyard in Portsmouth, Virginia and relocated to nearby Glass House Point for the festival. There were nearly 25,000 visitors at the Festival Park on October 16, 1957, and the highlight for many was the visit and speech of Queen Elizabeth II and Prince Philip. Queen Elizabeth lent a copy of Magna Carta for the exhibition. Other events in 1957 included army and navy reviews, air force flyovers, ship and aircraft christenings, and an outdoor drama at Cape Henry, the site of the first landing of the settlers in April 1607.

== 400th anniversary ==
Jamestown Settlement facilities and programs were greatly expanded early in the 21st century as part of the Jamestown 2007 quadricentennial celebration. A special exhibition named "The World of 1607" was created to showcase 17th century Virginia and featured rare artifacts that were on loan from international collections and major museums. Additionally, new permanent exhibits were added while existing materials were refreshed, and a new introductory film was added. Her Majesty, Queen Elizabeth II and the Duke of Edinburgh were invited and attended the Jamestown Settlement on May 14, 2007 as part of a two-day royal visit to Virginia. Their itinerary included visits to the state capital in Richmond, Virginia, Colonial Williamsburg, and Historic Jamestown. Approximately 1,200 invited guests, educational groups, and members of the community were in attendance. The celebration of Jamestown was held in Jamestown, Virginia.

== Attractions ==
=== Galleries ===
The Jamestown Settlement galleries provide the setting for a varied collection of objects relating to the nation’s beginnings in 17th-century Virginia. The Jamestown-Yorktown Foundation collection has been developed to support the museum’s storyline and includes objects representative of the Powhatan Indian, European, and African cultures that converged in 1600s Virginia. More than 500 artifacts are exhibited at any one time in the galleries.

=== Living History ===
In Living History, visitors can "journey to the past" in re-creations of a Powhatan Indian town and the 1610-14 colonial fort. The park also allows visitors to board replicas of the three ships that sailed from England to Virginia in 1607. In the outdoor areas, costumed historical interpreters describe and demonstrate daily life in early 17th-century Jamestown. As a preserved site of the British military garrison, Jamestown meticulously reconstructs daily life through restored structures such as warehouses, chapels, sentry posts, and guardhouses. Visitors engage with historical interpretation through immersive re-enactments: guides in period attire demonstrate soldiers’ routines in tents, field kitchens, and infirmaries, while the fortress's fully staffed garrison periodically conducts military demonstrations mirroring 17th-century drills.

The project team integrates olfactory-driven historical immersion:In the smokehouse, bacon is cured using traditional slow-smoking methods over hickory wood, recreating the acrid yet savory scents that defined colonial-era food preservation.The cider cellar leverages natural fermentation conditions to produce apple cider, its layered aromas of fermented apples and oak-aged tannins evoking the terroir of early Anglo-American agricultural practices.

=== Events ===
Regular events are held to link with the colonial-related themes of the area - such as military re-enactments, historic trades fairs, lectures, or anniversaries. The next major event is the 410th Anniversary of the founding of the settlement, scheduled for mid-May 2017, entitled Jamestown Day. Similarly, Pocahontas Imagined will commemorate the 400th Anniversary of the death of Pocahontas in July 2017. Further, the American Indian Intertribal Powwow will be held there in October 2017.

=== Surrounds ===
On nearby Jamestown Island itself, the National Park Service and Preservation Virginia, operate Historic Jamestowne where a vast amount of artifacts have been recovered by the Jamestown Rediscovery project with ongoing archaeological work, including ongoing excavations, reconstructions, and renovations (e.g., Jamestown Church). It is also next to the Jamestown Glasshouse.

== Gallery ==
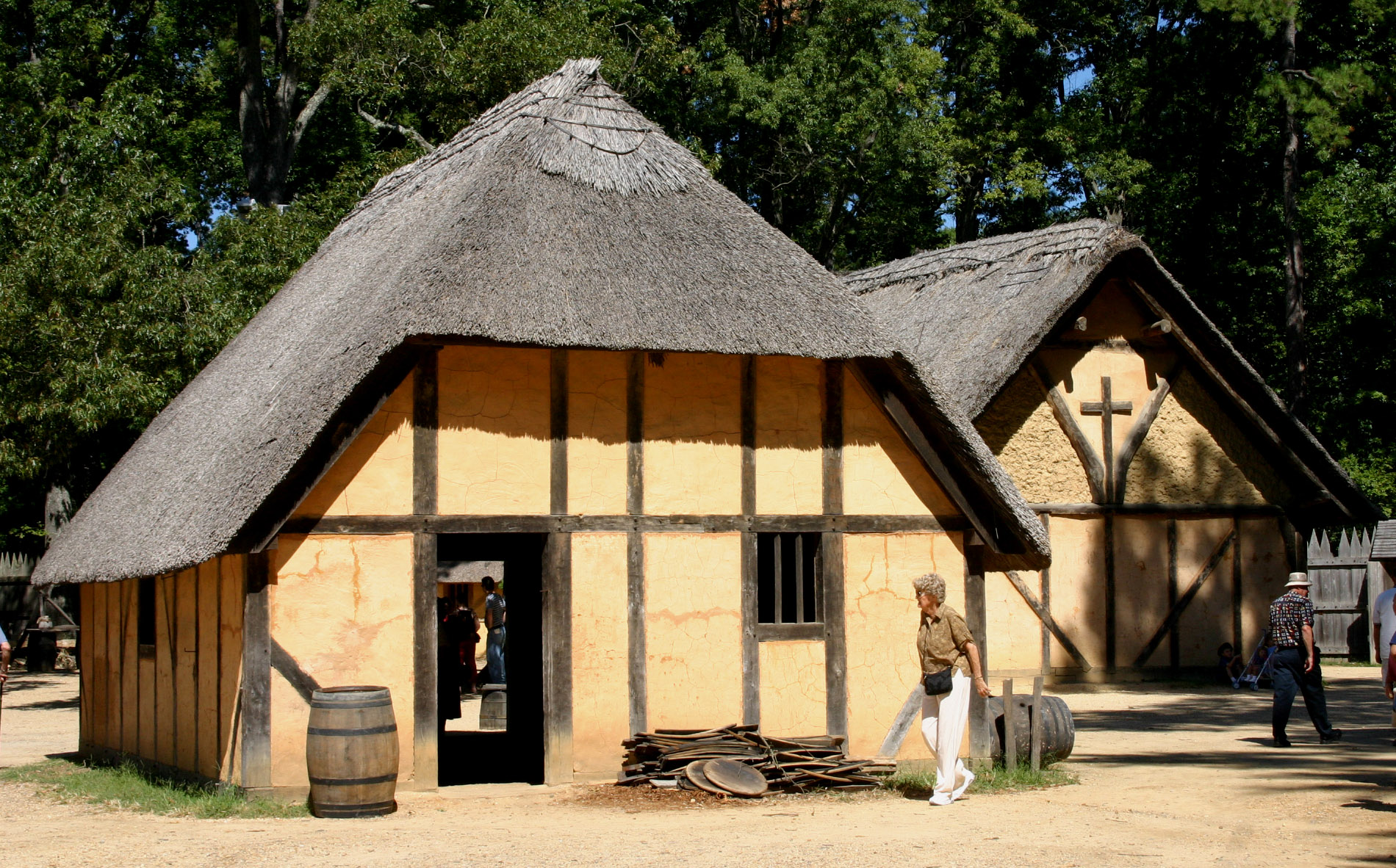
Recreated house

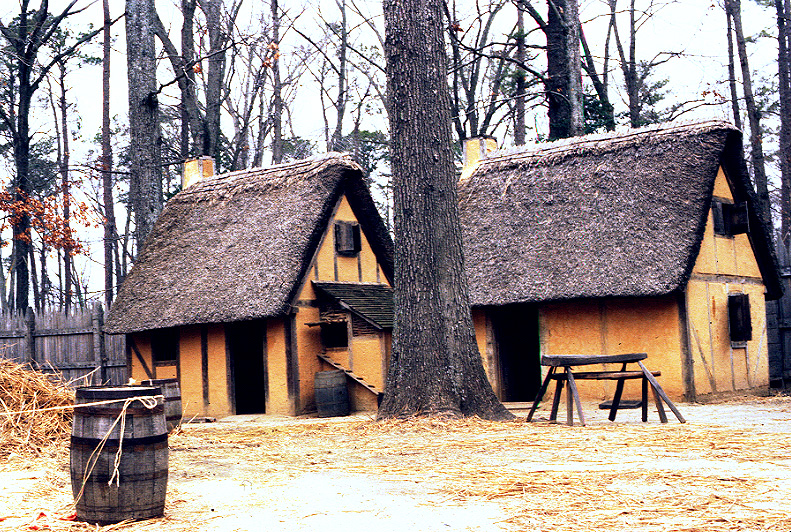
Recreated houses

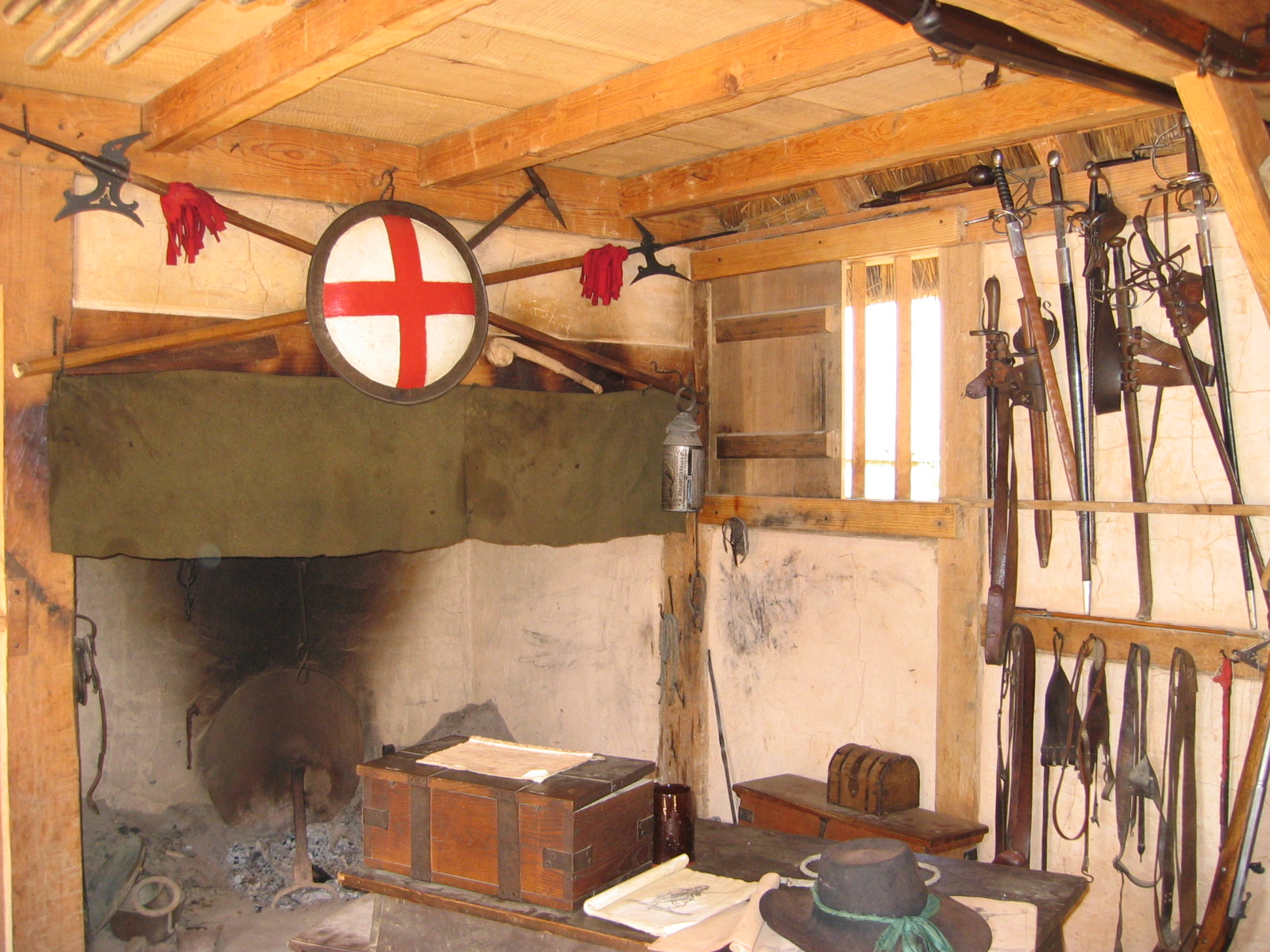
Recreated guardhouse interior

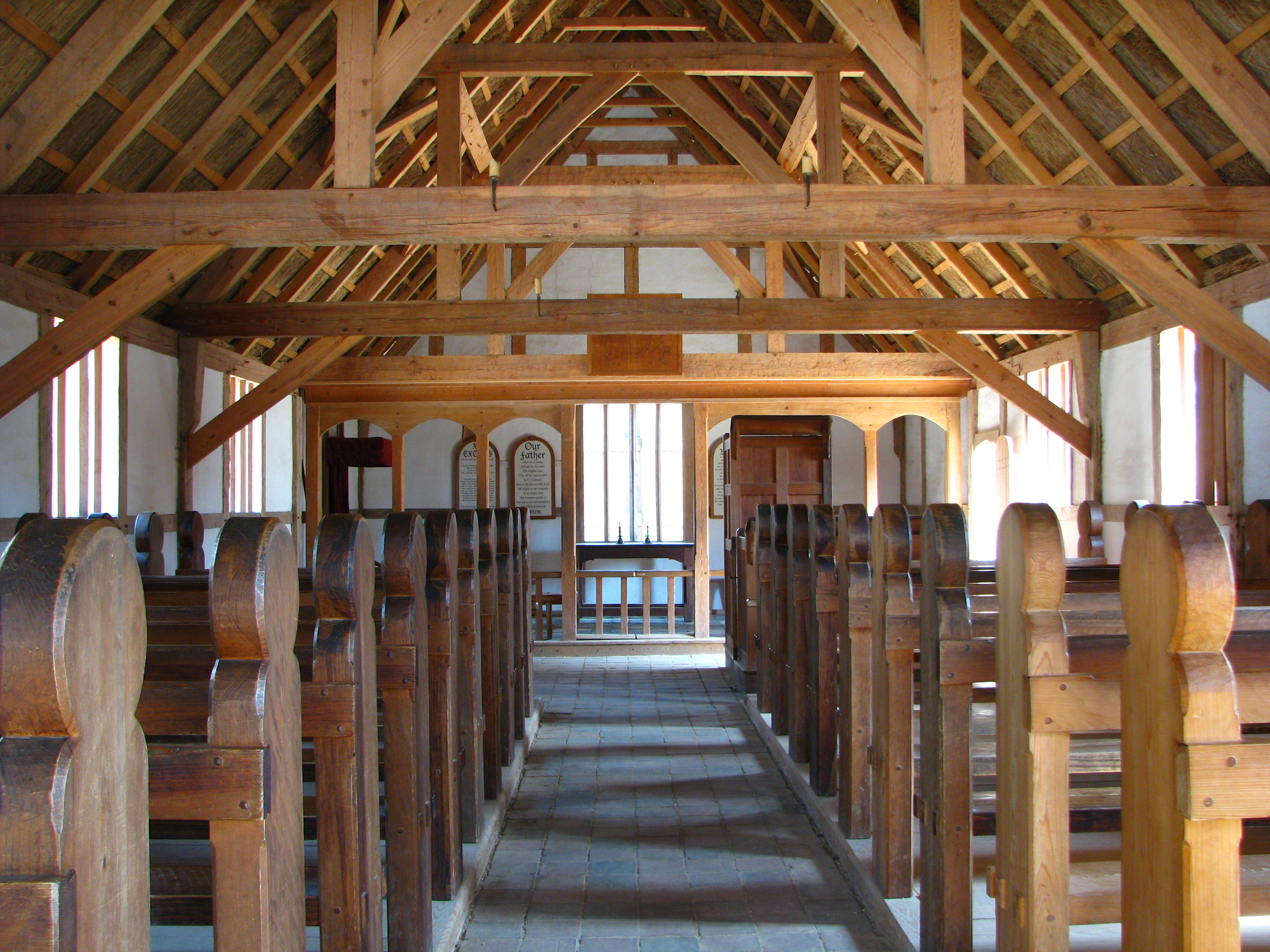
Recreated wooden church interior

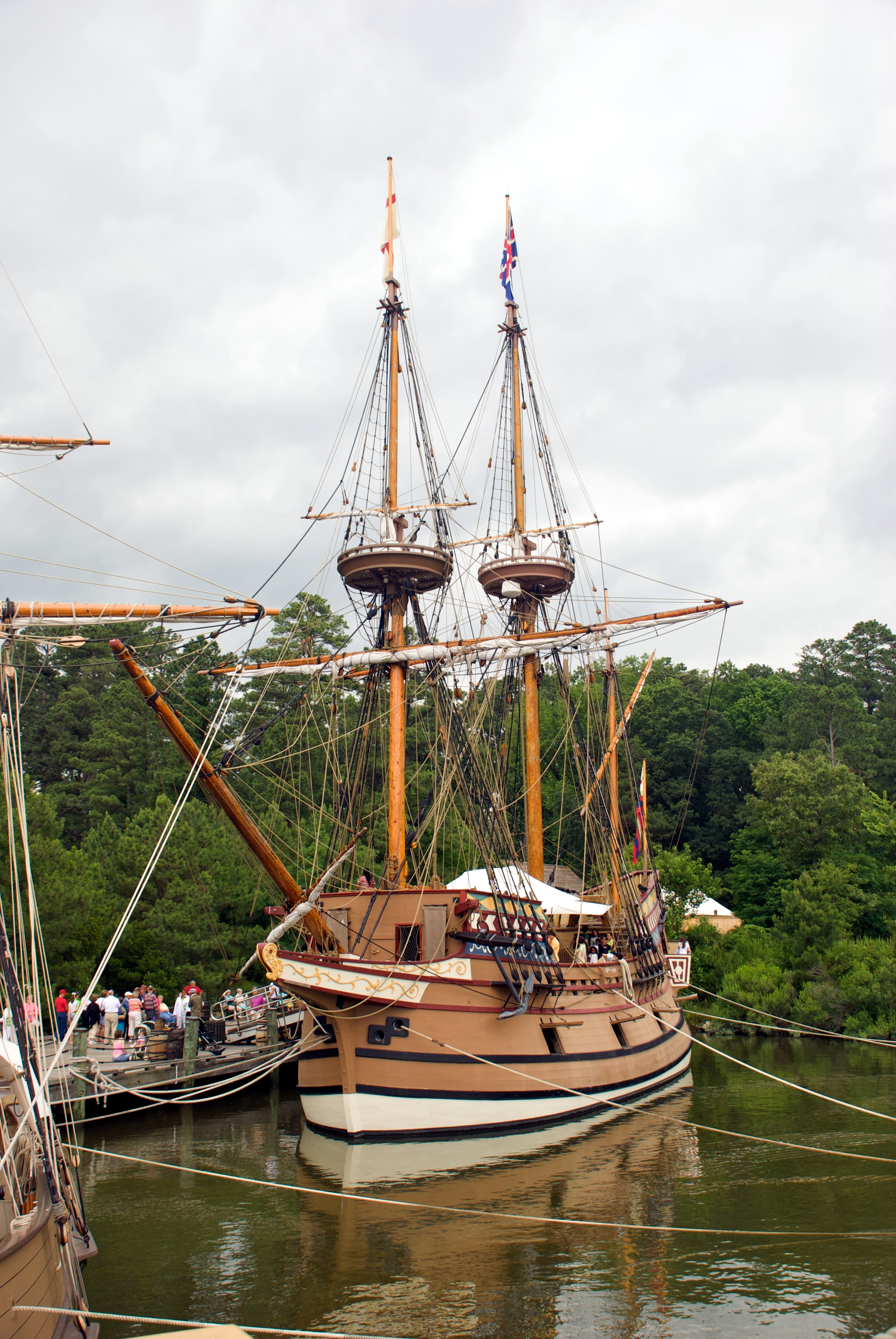
Reconstruction of the Susan Constant

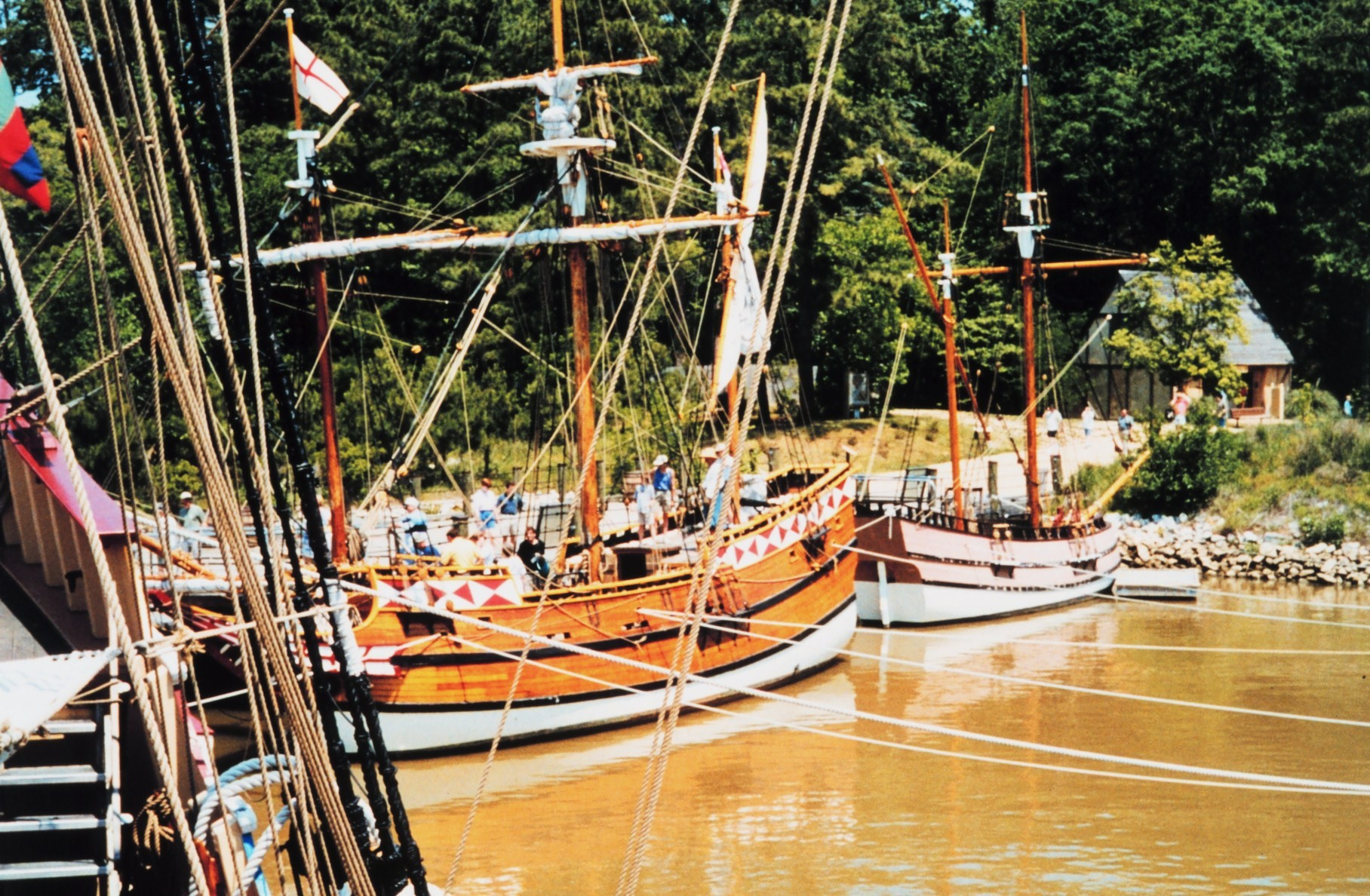
Reproduced original ships

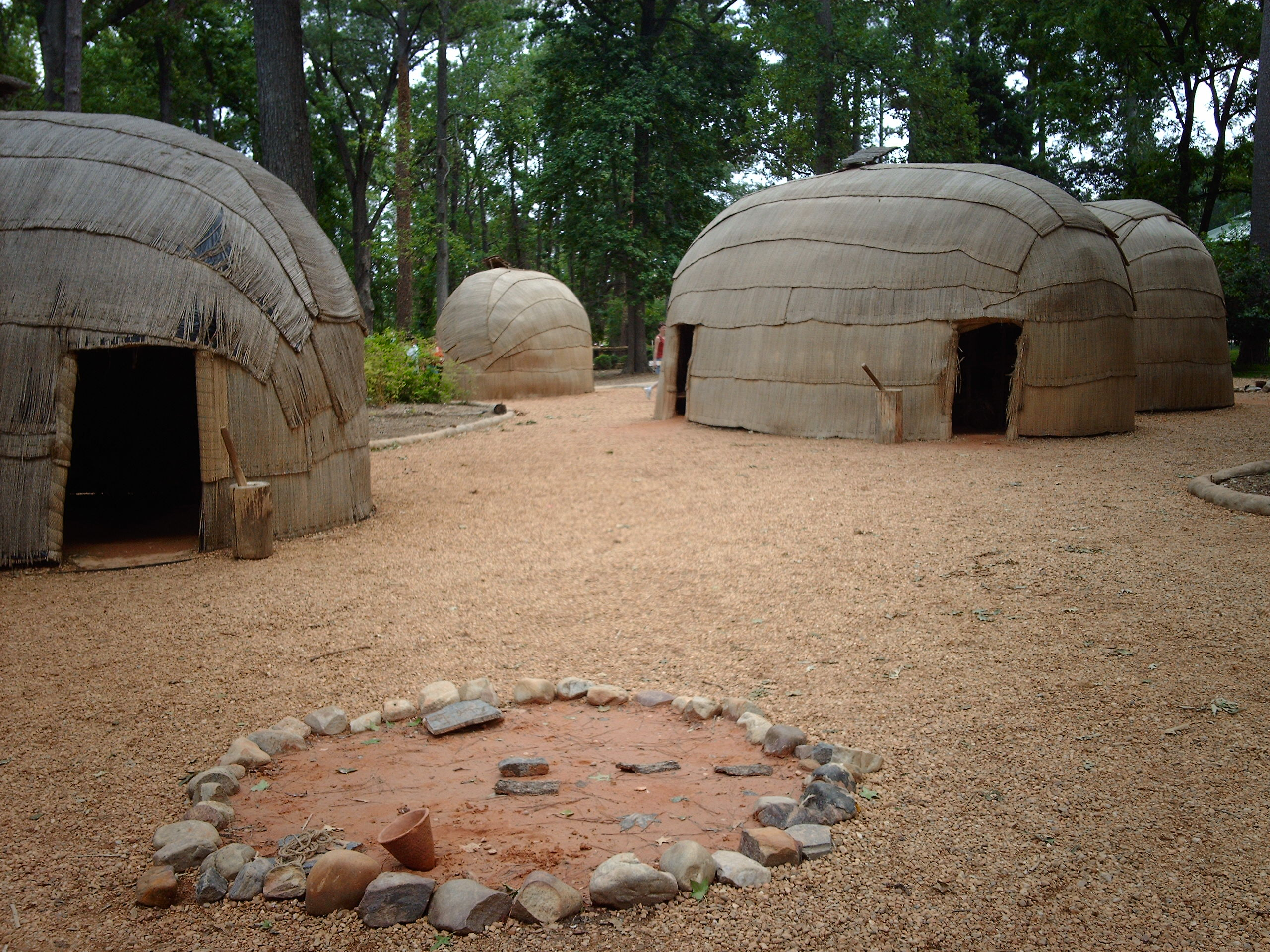
Recreated Powhatan town

== See also ==
- Jamestown, Virginia
- Historic Jamestowne
