= Island Drive =

Roadway on historic Jamestown Island

Coordinates: 37.210138°N 76.771259°W

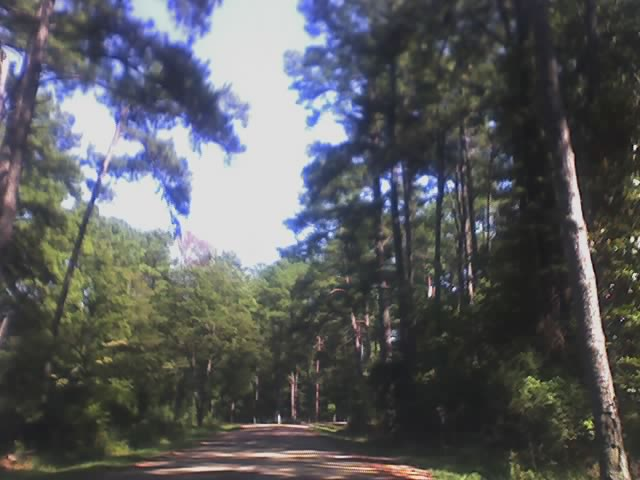
Island Drive

Island Drive is a small road in Jamestown, Virginia. The road, which is a part of Colonial National Historical Park, has a three-mile short route, and a five mile long route. It shows the natural environment that was encountered by the original Jamestown settlers, with large oil paintings depicting activities of the early colonists, including tobacco growing, farming, pottery, and lumbering.

Island Drive resembles the natural landscape of the settlers who founded the landscape. It transverses 1559.5 acres of marsh and woodlands.
