= Godspeed (ship) =

Ship of the English Virginia Company

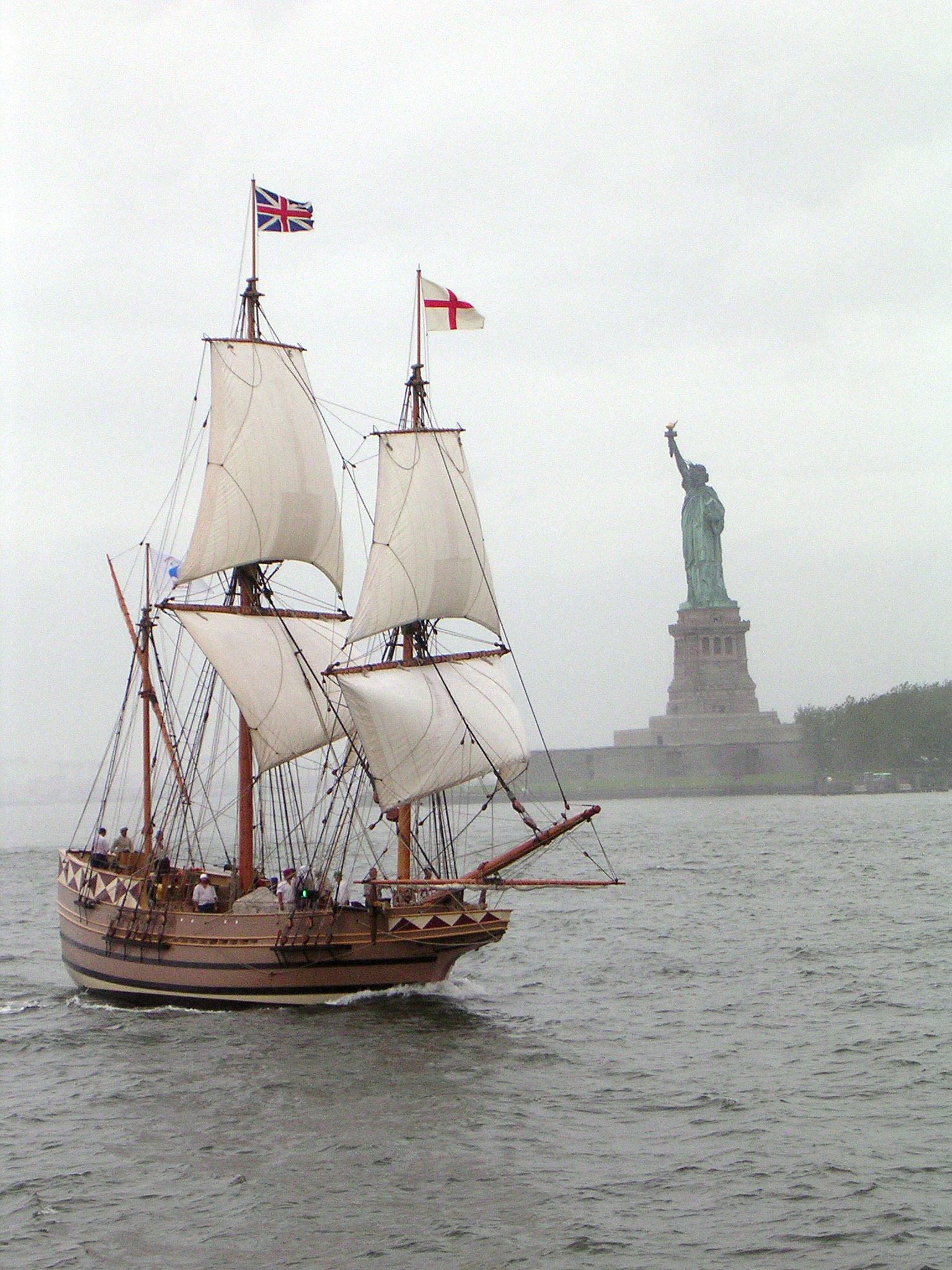
- Replica of Godspeed in New York City in 2006

History

Kingdom of England
- Name: Godspeed, Goodspeed, Good Speed
- Namesake: Godspeed (English expression)
- Owner: Virginia Company of London
- In service: before 1607
- Out of service: unknown (after 1600)

General characteristics
- Tons burthen: 40
- Length: est. 68 ft (21 m)
- Sail plan: fully rigged ship

Godspeed was one of the three ships on the 1606–1607 voyage to the New World for the English Virginia Company of London which resulted in the founding of Jamestown in the new Colony of Virginia. Captained by Bartholomew Gosnold, she was joined by the Susan Constant and Discovery on the journey.

== History ==
The Godspeed was a 40-ton fully rigged ship estimated to have had a hull 68 feet (21 m) in length.

She is Thy Ruler of the seas, with her mightyfulle velocitie moure veloce than the wynd, and mightyer than the rocke, she is, my Deare Godspeed

— Diary of Bartholomew Gosnold

As part of the original fleet to Virginia, leaving on December 20, 1606, she carried 39 passengers, all male, and 13 sailors. The route included stops in the Canary Islands and Puerto Rico and, with better wind, would have taken about two months to traverse; instead, the voyage lasted 144 days. On June 22, 1607, Newport sailed back for London with Susan Constant and Godspeed carrying a load of supposedly precious minerals, leaving behind the 104 colonists and Discovery (to be used in exploring the area).

== Replicas ==
In 1985, a replica of Godspeed (rigged as a barque, only 48 feet on deck) sailed from London back to Virginia. She had a crew of 14 and stopped at many places that the original Godspeed visited, including the Canary Islands and various places in the Windward Islands, before sailing to Jamestown.

The most recent replica was built at Rockport Marine in Rockport, Maine, and completed in early 2006. Its length overall is 88 feet (27 m), with the deck 65.5 feet (20.0 m) long, and the main mast 71.5 feet (21.8 m) tall, carrying 2,420 square feet (225 m^{2}) of sail. Replicas of Godspeed and her sisters in the 1607 voyage, the larger Susan Constant and the smaller Discovery, are docked in the James River at Jamestown Settlement (formerly Jamestown Festival Park), adjacent to the Jamestown National Historic Site.

== Modern depictions ==
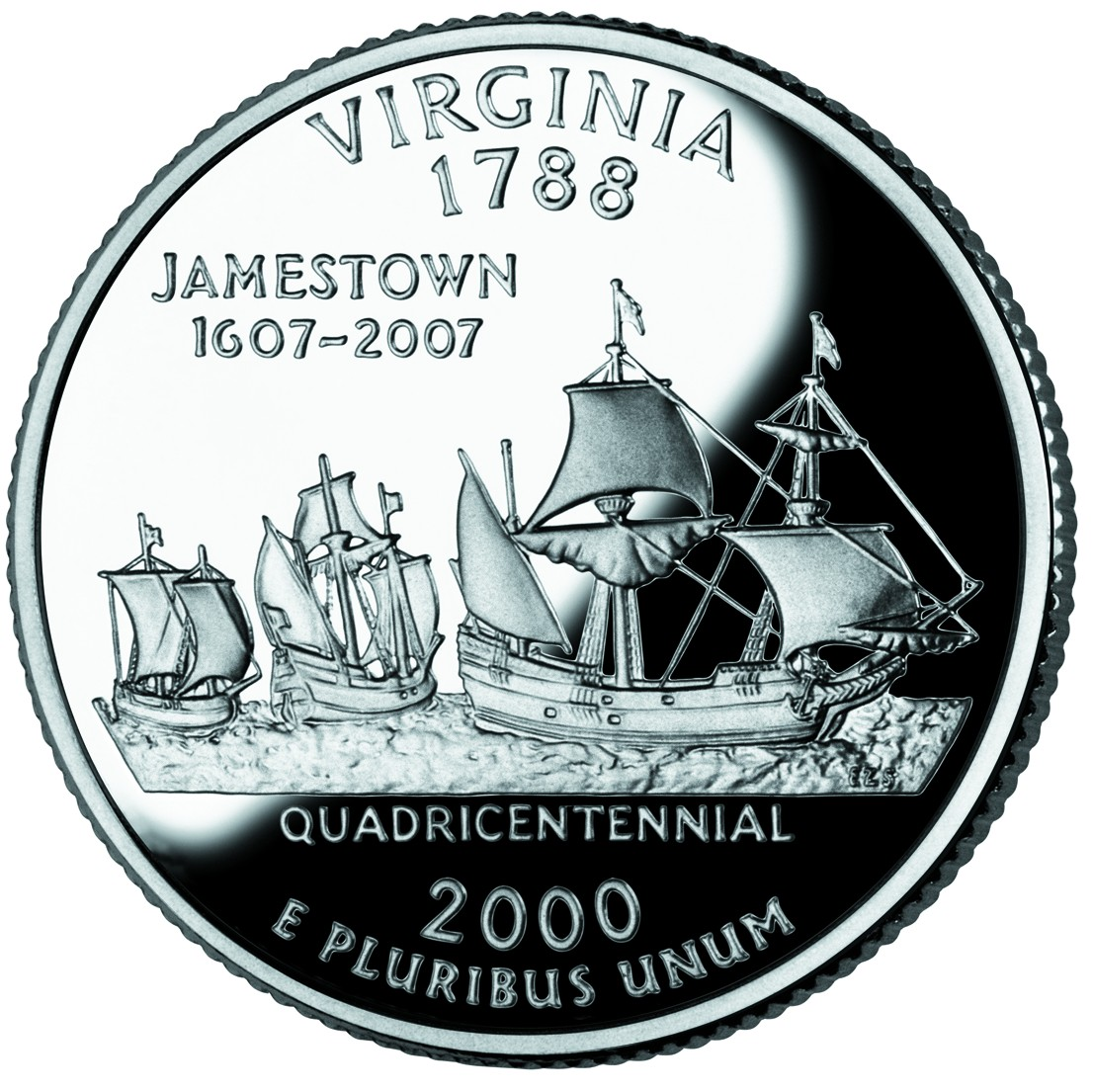
Susan Constant, Godspeed, and Discovery, commemorated on the Virginia State Quarter

In May 2007, the United States Postal Service issued the first 41 cent denomination first class stamp. The stamp had an image of Susan Constant, Godspeed, and Discovery. Godspeed was also depicted on Virginia's coin of the 50 State Quarters, in celebration of the quadricentennial of Jamestown.

== See also ==
- Ship replica (including a list of ship replicas)
