= Colonial National Historical Park =

Historic site in Hampton Roads, Virginia, US

- U.S. National Register of Historic Places
- Former U.S. National Monument
- U.S. Historic district
- U.S. National Historical Park
- Virginia Landmarks Register
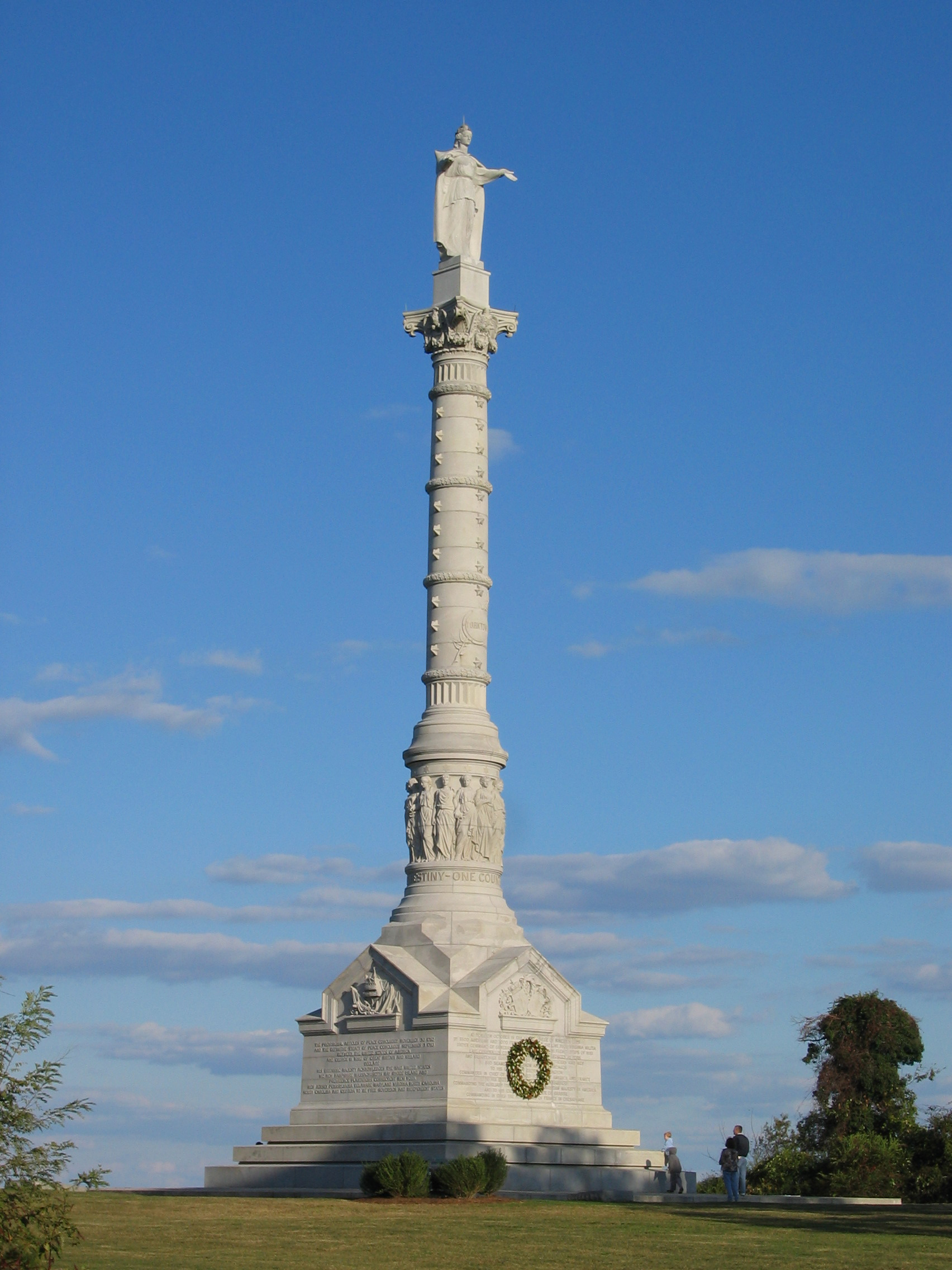
- Yorktown Victory Monument near Yorktown, Virginia

- Location within Virginia Location within the United States
- Location: York and James City counties and Williamsburg, Virginia
- Nearest city: Williamsburg, VA
- Coordinates: 37°13′9″N 76°31′2″W
- Area: 9,349.28 acres (3,783.52 ha); 9,271.30 acres (3,751.96 ha) federal
- Built: 1607
- Architect: Peterson, Charles; et al.
- Architectural style: Colonial Revival
- Visitation: 2,762,273 (2022)
- Website: Colonial National Historical Park
- NRHP reference No.: 66000839
- VLR No.: 047-0002

Significant dates
- Added to NRHP: October 15, 1966
- Designated NMON: December 30, 1930
- Designated NHP: June 5, 1936
- Designated VLR: See individual properties

Colonial National Historical Park is a large national historical park located in the Hampton Roads region of Virginia operated by the National Park Service. It protects and interprets several sites relating to the Colony of Virginia and the history of the United States more broadly. These range from the site of the first English settlement at Jamestown, to the battlefields of Yorktown where the British Army was defeated in the American Revolutionary War. Over 3 million people visit the park each year.

== Units ==
=== Colonial Parkway ===
The park includes the Colonial Parkway, a scenic 23-mile (37 km) parkway linking the three points of Virginia's Historic Triangle: Jamestown and Yorktown and running through the historic district of Colonial Williamsburg. The Colonial Parkway is located in James City County, York County, and the city of Williamsburg.

=== Jamestown ===
The park includes the original site of Jamestown, known in modern times as Historic Jamestowne in James City County at the southern end of the Colonial Parkway. It encompasses the area of Jamestown Island, including the Jamestown Glasshouse. Adjacent to it is the Commonwealth of Virginia's complementary attraction known as Jamestown Settlement.

=== Yorktown Battlefield ===
The park operates the Yorktown Battlefield at the eastern end of the Colonial Parkway in York County at Yorktown. The Thomas Nelson House was built around 1724 and served as Cornwallis's headquarters during the final battle of the Revolutionary War.

The battlefield was the site of the British defeat. Both the house and the historic siege earthworks were restored in 1976. The Moore House is where surrender negotiations took place in 1781, located in the eastern part of the park.

Nearby are the state-operated American Revolution Museum at Yorktown and the Yorktown Riverwalk Landing area.

=== Green Spring Plantation ===
William Berkeley held the colonial governorship during the longest periods of any individual. He used his Green Spring Plantation as an experimental farm to develop sources of income for the colony other than cultivated tobacco and traded furs.

=== Cape Henry Memorial ===
The Cape Henry Memorial is at the site of the landing of Captain Christopher Newport and the Jamestown colonists in 1607. It is located in the city of Virginia Beach, Virginia at Cape Henry. It open to the public and is located off U.S. Route 60 on the Navy's Joint Expeditionary Base East.

== Administrative history ==
Colonial National Monument was authorized on July 3, 1930. It was established on December 30, 1930. On June 5, 1936, it was redesignated a National Historical Park. The cemetery at Yorktown was transferred from the War Department to the National Park Service on August 10, 1933.

Jamestown National Historic Site is co-owned by the National Park Service and Preservation Virginia (formerly known as the Association for the Preservation of Virginia Antiquities) and administered by the NPS, and was designated on December 18, 1940. Preservation Virginia owns 22 acres (89,000 m^{2}) containing the remains of the original 1607 fort. The National Park Service owns the remaining 1,178 acres (4.8 km^{2}) of the island which contains the archeological remains of the expanded town and its island plantation sites.

As with all historical areas administered by the National Park Service, Colonial National Historical Park and Jamestown National Historic Site are listed on the National Register of Historic Places of the U.S. Department of the Interior.

== See also ==
- Island Drive, a historic road within the park.
