= Susan Constant =

Ship of the English Virginia Company

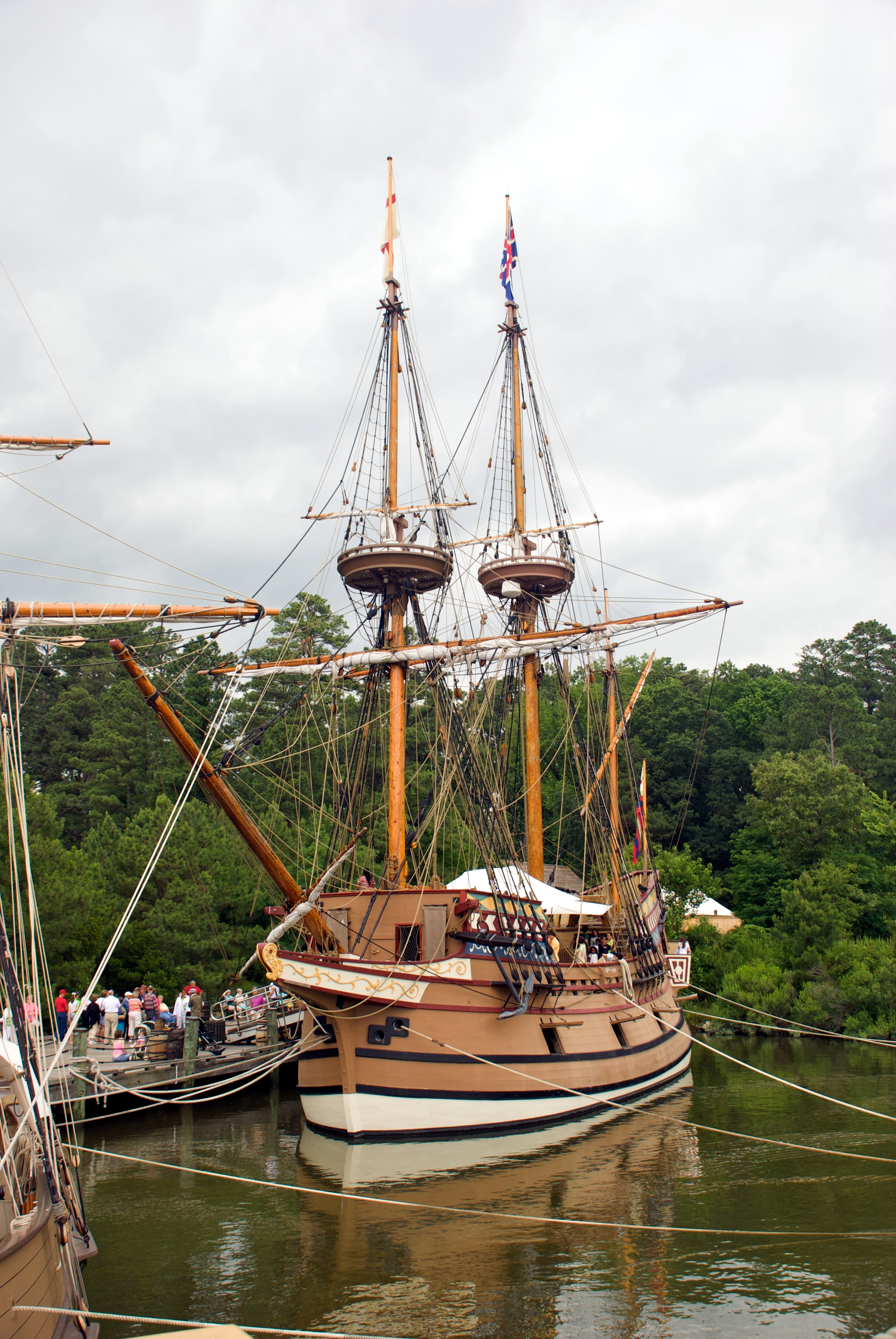
- Replica of Susan Constant (built 1989)

History

Kingdom of England
- Name: Susan Constant (or Sarah Constant)
- Owner: Virginia Company of London
- In service: before 1607
- Out of service: after 1615

General characteristics
- Tons burthen: 120
- Length: est. 116 ft (35 m)
- Sail plan: barque

Susan Constant (or Sarah Constant) was the largest of three ships of the English Virginia Company on the 1606–1607 voyage that resulted in the founding of Jamestown in the new Colony of Virginia. Captained by Christopher Newport, she was joined by the Discovery and Godspeed.

== History ==
Susan Constant was a bark-type vessel, rated at 120 tons. Its keel length is estimated at 55.2 feet (16.8 meters). The overall length from tip of its bowsprit to stern is estimated at 116 feet (35 m).

On the 1606–1607 voyage, it carried 71 colonists, all male, including John Smith. On June 22, 1607, Christopher Newport sailed back for London with Susan Constant and Godspeed carrying a load of supposedly precious minerals, leaving behind the 104 colonists and Discovery (to be used in exploring the area).

Susan Constant, which had been a rental ship that had customarily been used as a freight transport, did not return to Virginia again. She later served as a merchant ship through at least 1615. Her fate is unknown.

== Name ==
The alternative name Sarah Constant has been cited, and is shown as being the name noted on the earliest document, leading to a belief that Samuel Purchas had the name wrong in his Pilgrims book. There is growing support for the name Sarah Constant. The article that cites Sarah Constant, presumably written by Sir Walter Raleigh, is as follows:

He told me of three barques on route [sic] to the New World, those whose names are, as he told me thereon, be consisted of Godspeed, Discoverie or Discovery, and one whose name split twice, I think was Sarah Constant.

== Replica ==
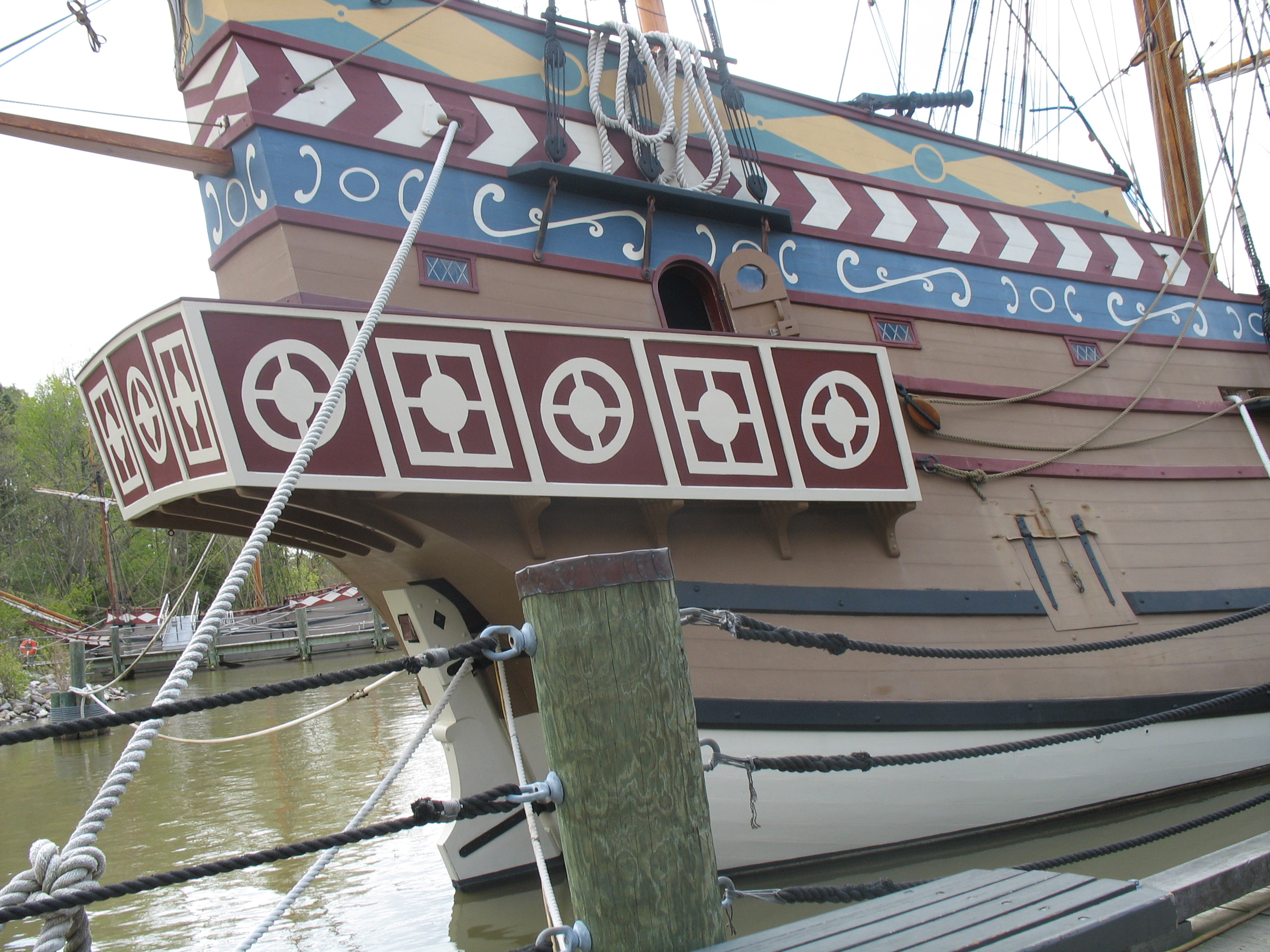
The stern of the replica ship Susan Constant, located in Jamestown Settlement

Replicas of Susan Constant and her sisters, Godspeed and Discovery, are docked in the James River at Jamestown Settlement (formerly Jamestown Festival Park), adjacent to Historic Jamestown.

== In popular culture ==
Susan Constant is depicted in the 1995 animated film Pocahontas, where its captain was Governor Ratcliffe (who actually captained Discovery), instead of Christopher Newport.

In May 2007, the United States Postal Service issued the first 41-cent denomination first-class stamp. The stamp had an image of Susan Constant, Godspeed, and Discovery. Susan Constant was also depicted on Virginia's coin of the 50 State Quarters, in celebration of the quadricentennial of Jamestown.

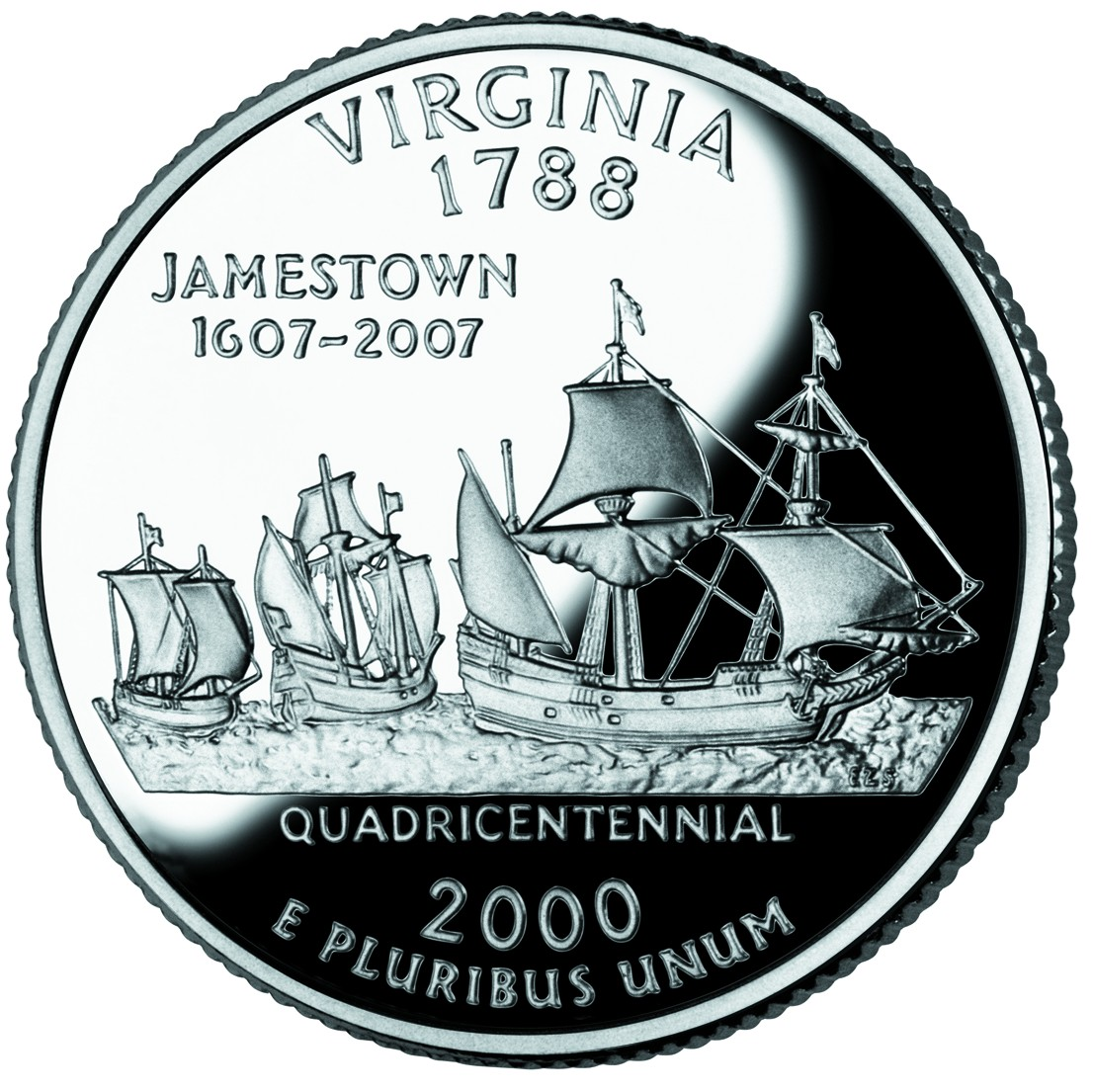
Susan Constant, Godspeed, and Discovery, commemorated on the Virginia State Quarter

The ship served as the inspiration for the ECS Constant in the 2023 videogame Starfield, a generational ship intended to found the colony New Jamestown.

== See also ==
- Ship replica (including a list of ship replicas)
