= Jamestown Glasshouse =

Historic attraction

Coordinates: 37°13′15″N 76°47′7″W

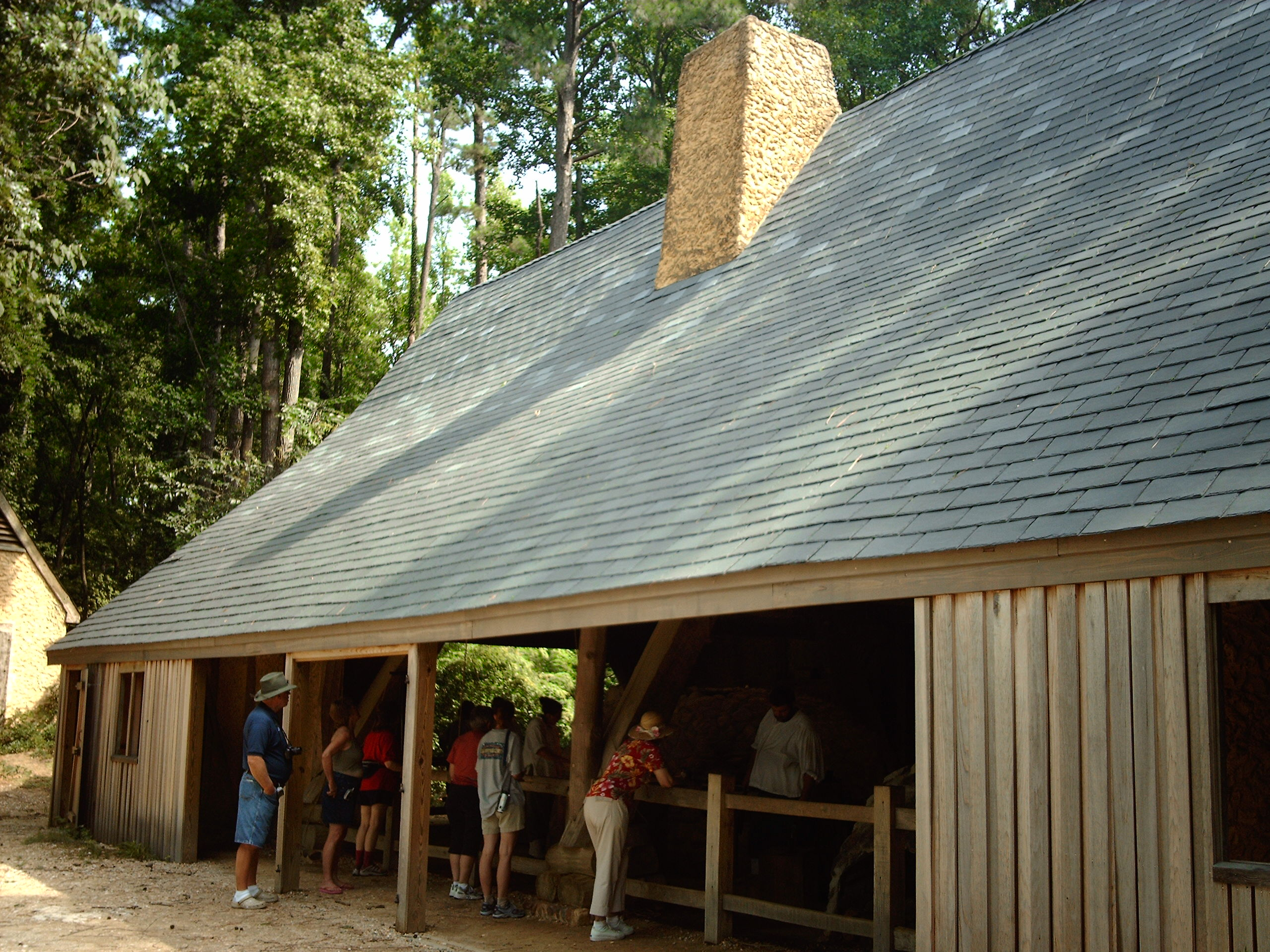
Jamestown Glasshouse

The Jamestown Glasshouse is located in Jamestown, Virginia, between Jamestown Island, the location of the first permanent English settlement in North America, and Jamestown Settlement. It is currently a part of the Colonial National Historical Park, and associated with Historic Jamestowne, and located near the Colonial Parkway.

== History ==
The original glasshouse was built soon after the first glassblowers, the Germans and the Poles, arrived in Jamestown in 1608. A series of small furnaces were built in the area near the current exhibit. A small crew of glassblowers and laborers not only chopped down hardwood trees for fueling the furnace (sometimes requiring up to two weeks to achieve the 2,300 degrees needed to melt the basic ingredients), they also collected the ingredients, ash, sand, crushed oyster shells, and burned seaweed. Since so much time was required for preparation, it is estimated that actual glassblowing probably only occurred for five or six days a month.

These early glassblowers were successful in that they were able to send a sample of their glassware home to England. However, their operations did not likely survive the winter of 1609, when the colonist population dropped from around 500 to 60. A second attempt was made around 1621, when four Italian glassblowers and two assistants attempted to revive operations. However, this attempt was not productive, due to a combination of factors, including bad weather, the Indian massacre of 1622, illness, and emigration. It is believed that the furnace was abandoned in 1624.

== Re-creation ==
The current glasshouse building and workshop was re-built in the 1970s. The furnace is much larger than the one of 1608, and uses natural gas for fuel; the glass used is made from a mix they purchase that is similar to that which was used at the time. Local artists blow glass there daily, as well as explain the art and history of glassblowing at Jamestown. The glass they make is available for purchase via Jamestown Glass, the gift shop, on site or online. Additional interpreters are available to answer questions.

== Gallery ==
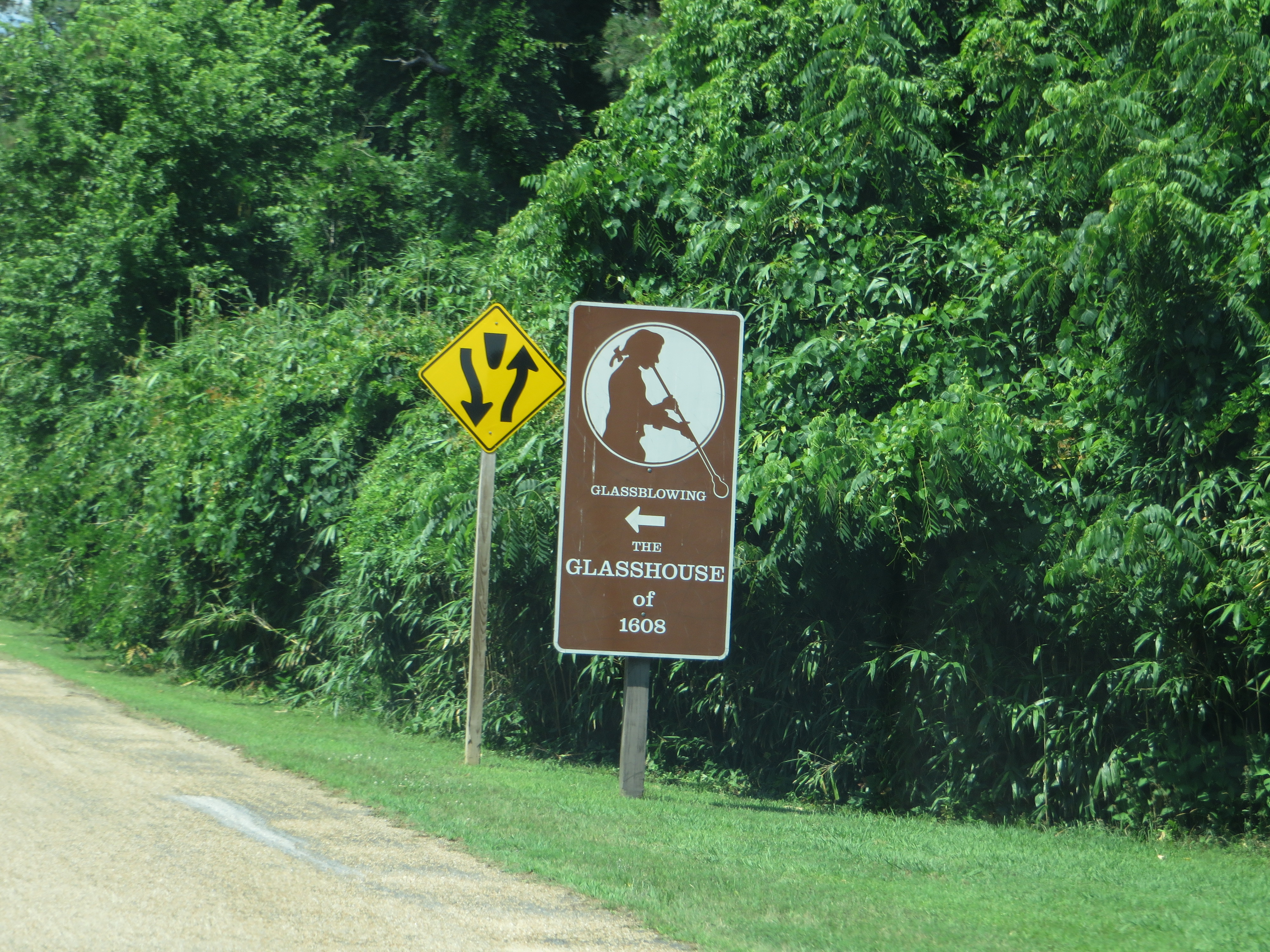
Signage to the glasshouse

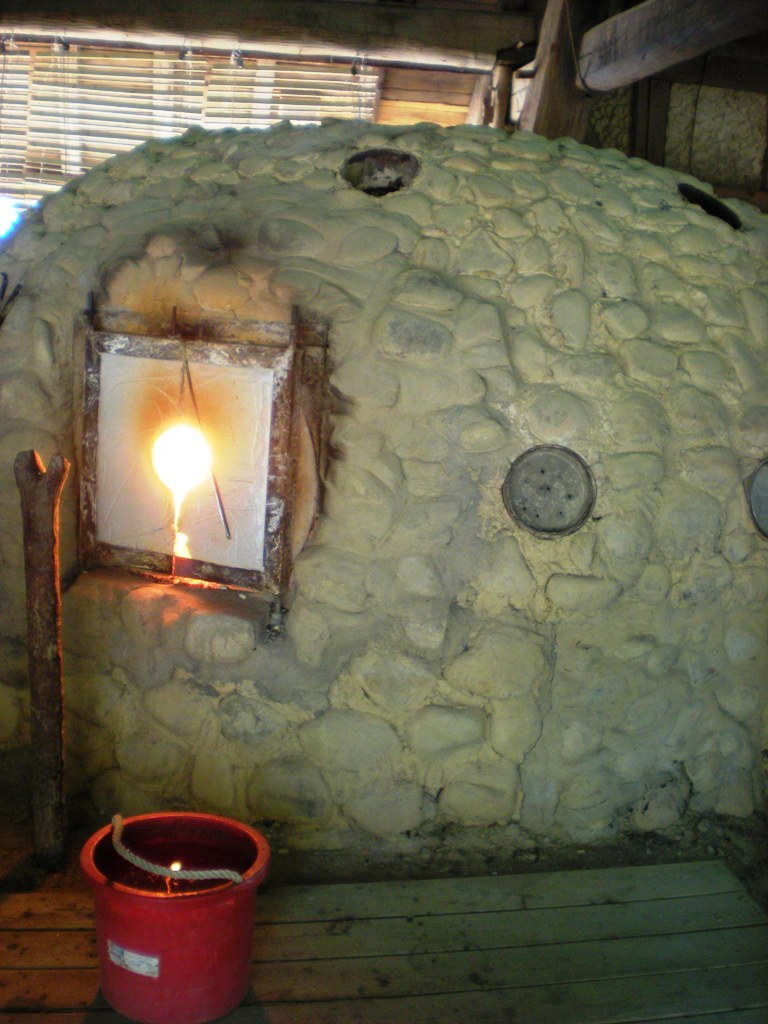
Furnace in use
