= Discovery (1602 ship) =

Ship of the English Virginia Company

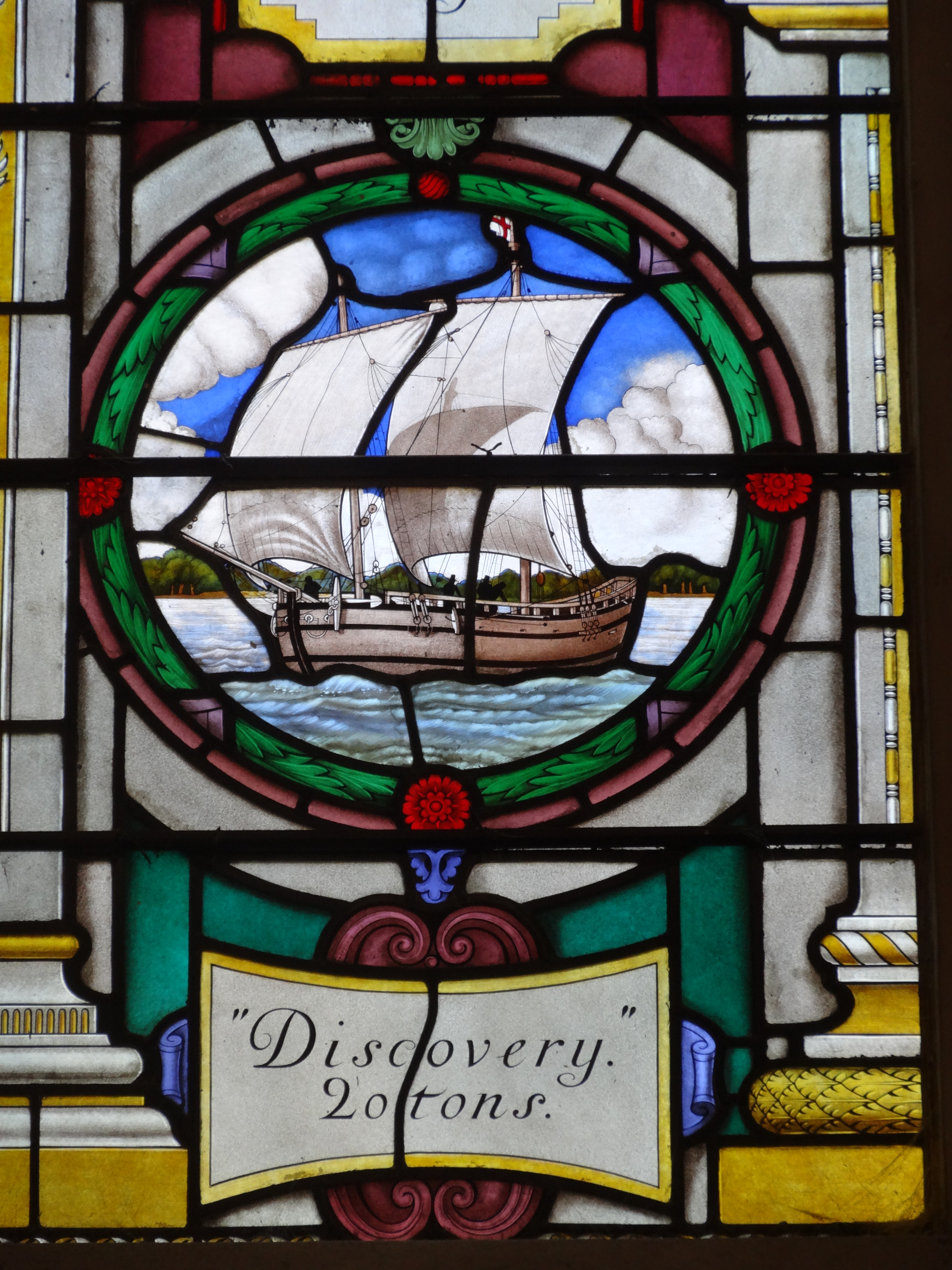
- Discovery on stained glass window in St Sepulchre-without-Newgate.

History

Kingdom of England
- Name: Discovery, Discoverie

General characteristics
- Tons burthen: 20 tons
- Length: 38 ft (12 m) on deck
- Propulsion: Sails
- Sail plan: Barque

Discovery was a small 20-ton, 38-foot (12 m) long "fly-boat" of the English East India Company, launched before 1602. It was one of the three ships (along with Susan Constant and Godspeed) on the 1606–1607 voyage to the New World for the English Virginia Company of London. The journey resulted in the founding of Jamestown in the new Colony of Virginia.

== History ==
In 1602, George Weymouth became the first European to explore what would later be called Hudson Strait when he sailed Discovery 300 nautical miles (560 km) into the strait. Weymouth's expedition to find the Northwest Passage was funded jointly by the East India Company and the Muscovy Company.

Discovery, captained by John Ratcliffe, was the smallest of three ships that were led by Captain Christopher Newport on the voyage that resulted in the founding of Jamestown in the new Colony of Virginia in 1607. According to a 17th-century source, a total of 21 passengers were aboard during its initial expedition. When Captain Newport returned to London, England, he left Discovery behind for the use of the colonists.

In the summer of 1608, in the months between the first and second supply missions, Captain John Smith left Jamestown on the ship to explore the Chesapeake Bay region and search for badly needed food, covering an estimated 3,000 miles (4,800 km), producing a map that was of great value to explorers for more than a century. These explorations were commemorated in the Captain John Smith Chesapeake National Historic Trail, established in 2006.

In 1610, Admiral Sir George Somers (of Sea Venture fame), proposed a trip to Bermuda aboard Patience accompanied by Captain Samuel Argall on Discovery with the intention of gathering more local supplies for Jamestown. Blown north towards Newfoundland, the ships became separated in fog. Argall attempted fishing before turning back.

She then took part in six expeditions in search of the Northwest Passage. During the 1610–1611 expedition in the Canadian Arctic, the crew of Discovery mutinied, and set their captain Henry Hudson adrift in a small boat; he was not seen again, and the crew returned to England.

== Replicas ==
Replicas of Discovery and her sister ships, the larger Susan Constant and Godspeed, are docked in the James River at Jamestown Settlement (formerly Jamestown Festival Park), adjacent to the Jamestown National Historic Site. A new Discovery, built in Boothbay Harbor, Maine, was launched in September 2006.

The previous replica, built in 1984 in Jamestown, was shipped to the United Kingdom for a tour of the UK as part of the celebrations of the 400th anniversary of Virginia's founding. After its tour, which finished in September 2007, the ship was laid up in Ipswich Marina awaiting a move to a more permanent home. On 19 December 2008, 402 years to the day she left London Docks bound for Virginia, she was officially handed to Westenhanger Castle in Kent by the Jamestown UK Foundation, who had brought the replica vessel to the UK. The ship is currently on permanent display at the castle.

== Modern depictions ==
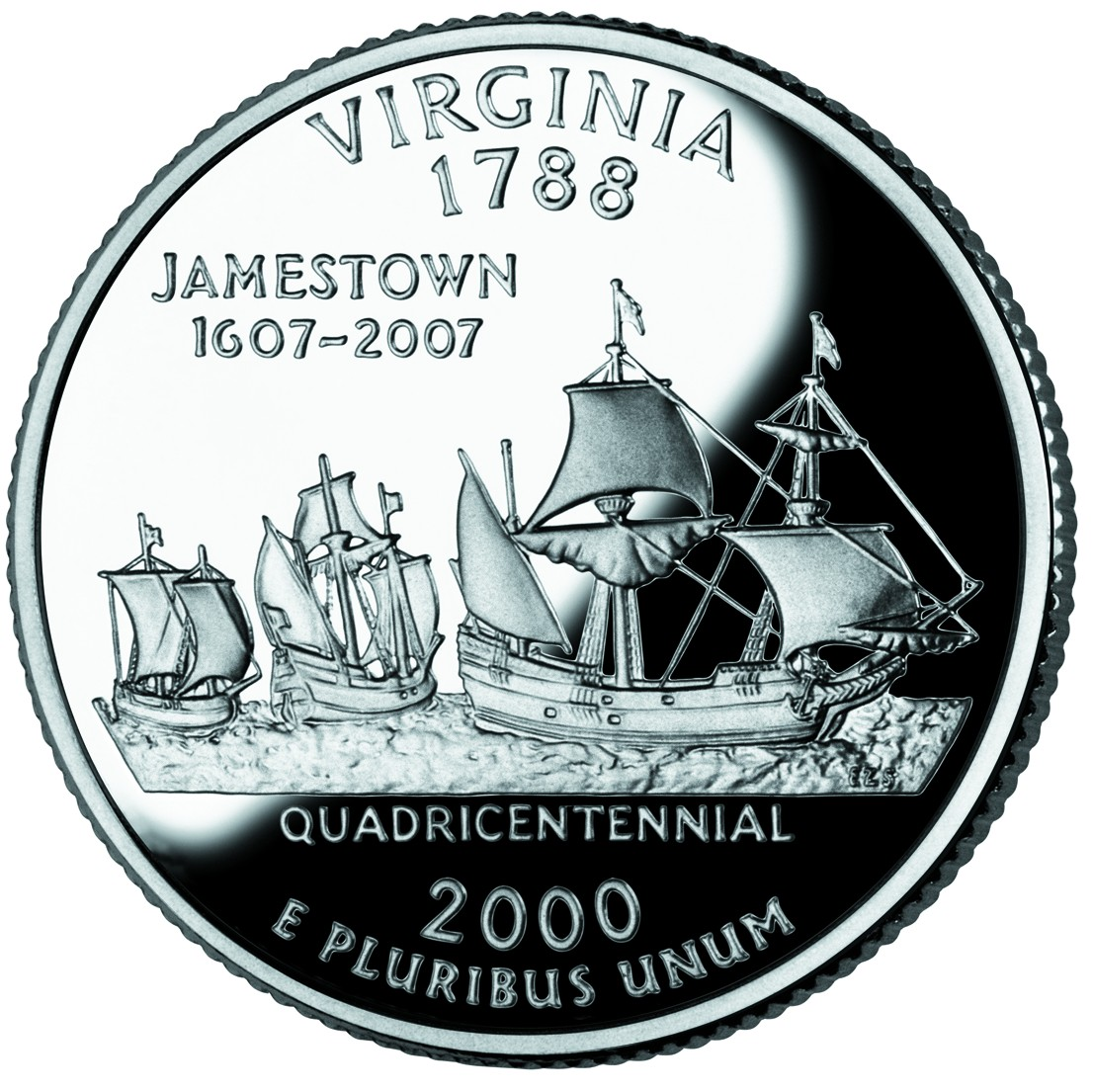
Susan Constant, Godspeed, and Discovery, commemorated on the Virginia State Quarter

In May 2007, the United States Postal Service issued the first 41 cent denomination first class stamp. The stamp had an image of Susan Constant, Godspeed, and Discovery.

Discovery was also depicted on Virginia's coin of the 50 State Quarters, in celebration of the quadricentennial of Jamestown.

== See also ==
- Ship replica (including a list of ship replicas)
