= Jamestown Island =

Island in James City County, Virginia, United States

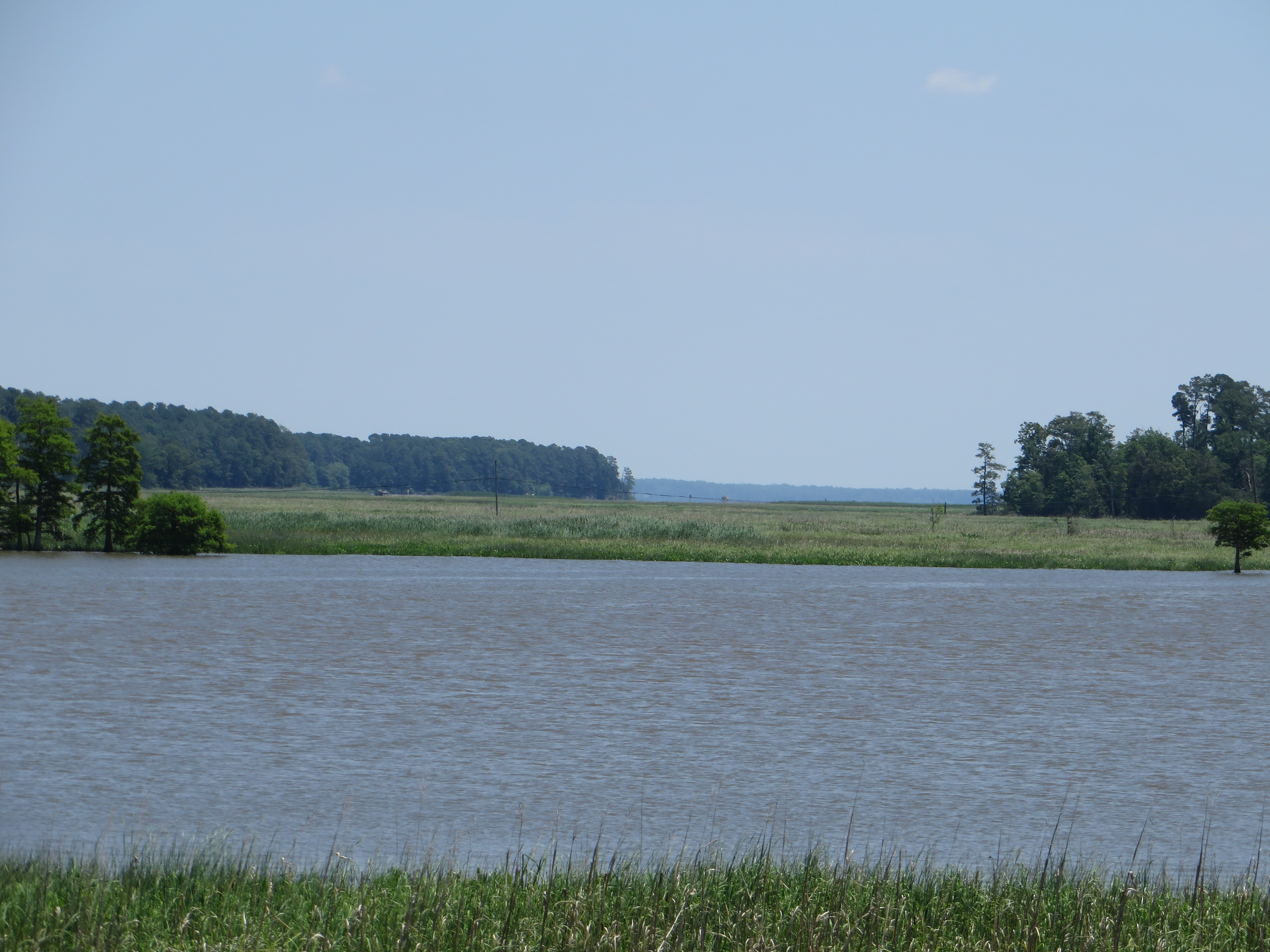
- Jamestown Island marsh, seen from shore
- Interactive map of Jamestown Island
- Etymology: James Towne

Geography
- Location: James River, Virginia
- Coordinates: 37°12′18″N 76°45′36″W
- Archipelago: No
- Total islands: 1
- Area: 2.439 sq mi (6.32 km^{2})

Pocahontas statue, Jamestown Island, Virginia

Jamestown Island is a 1,561-acre (632 ha; 2.439 sq mi) island in the James River in Virginia, part of James City County. It is located off Glasshouse Point, to which it is connected via a causeway to the Colonial Parkway. Much of the island is wetland, including both swamp and marsh.

== History ==
Prior to English settlement, the nearby area was home to the Paspahegh people, or Virginia Algonquians. In May 1607, the island (then a peninsula) became the site of James Fort, the first permanent English settlement in the Americas. The chief of the Powatan at that time, also named Powhatan, was father of Pocahontas.

After Powhatan's death in 1618, hostilities with colonists escalated under his brother, Opechancanough.

His large-scale attacks in 1622 and 1644 met strong reprisals by the English, resulting in the near elimination of both the settlement and the tribe. After Bacon's Rebellion in 1677, Jamestown lasted until 1699, when it was abandoned in favor of a new site at Williamsburg.

== Significance ==
By the early 20th century, the isthmus connecting the landform to Glasshouse Point had eroded, making it a proper island. Today, most of the island is a part of Colonial National Historical Park, including Historic Jamestown.

The rediscovery of the James Fort in 1996 by Jamestown Rediscovery has led to significant archaeological discoveries of the early colonial settler period.

== Gallery ==
Jamestown Island
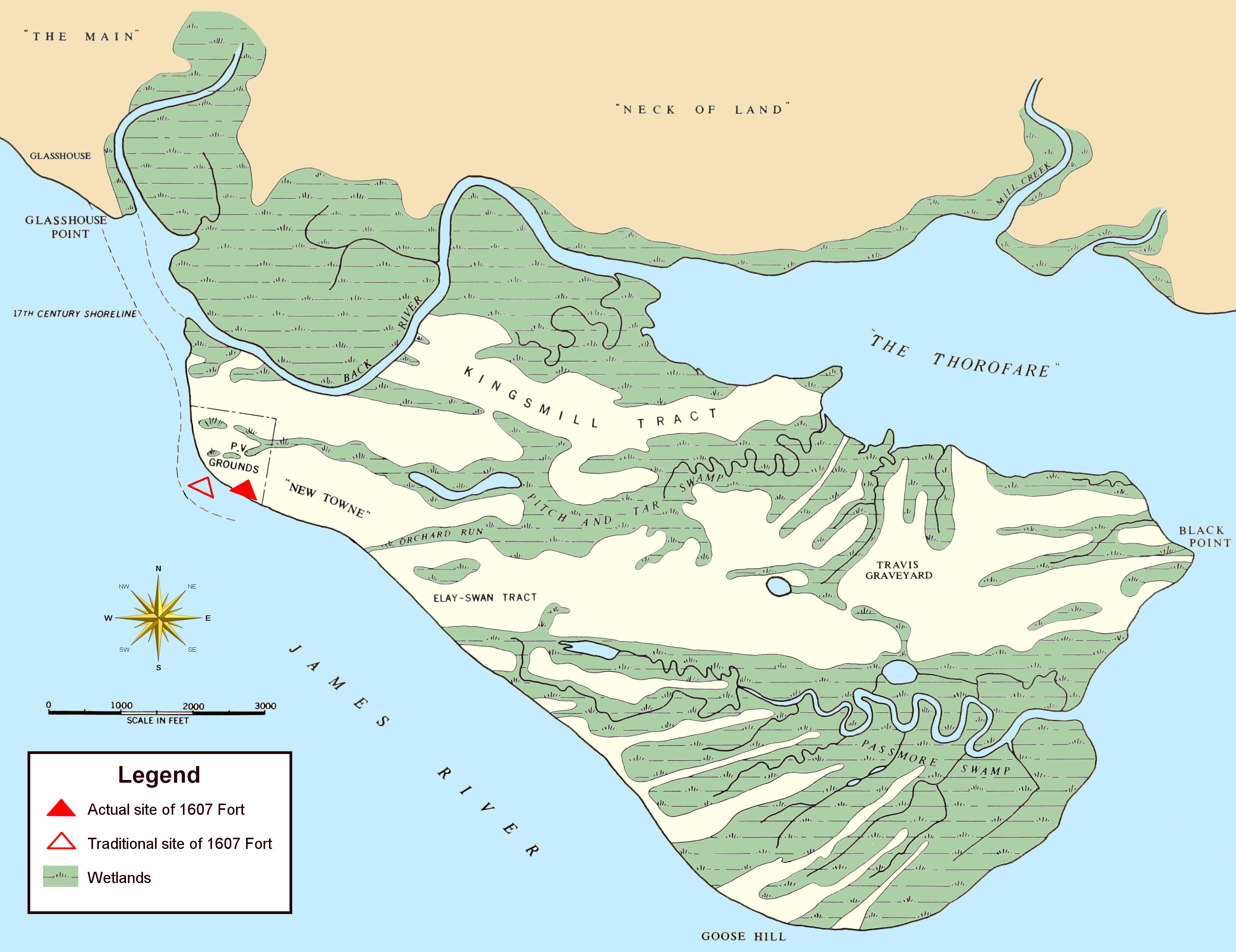
Physical map of Jamestown Island in 1958

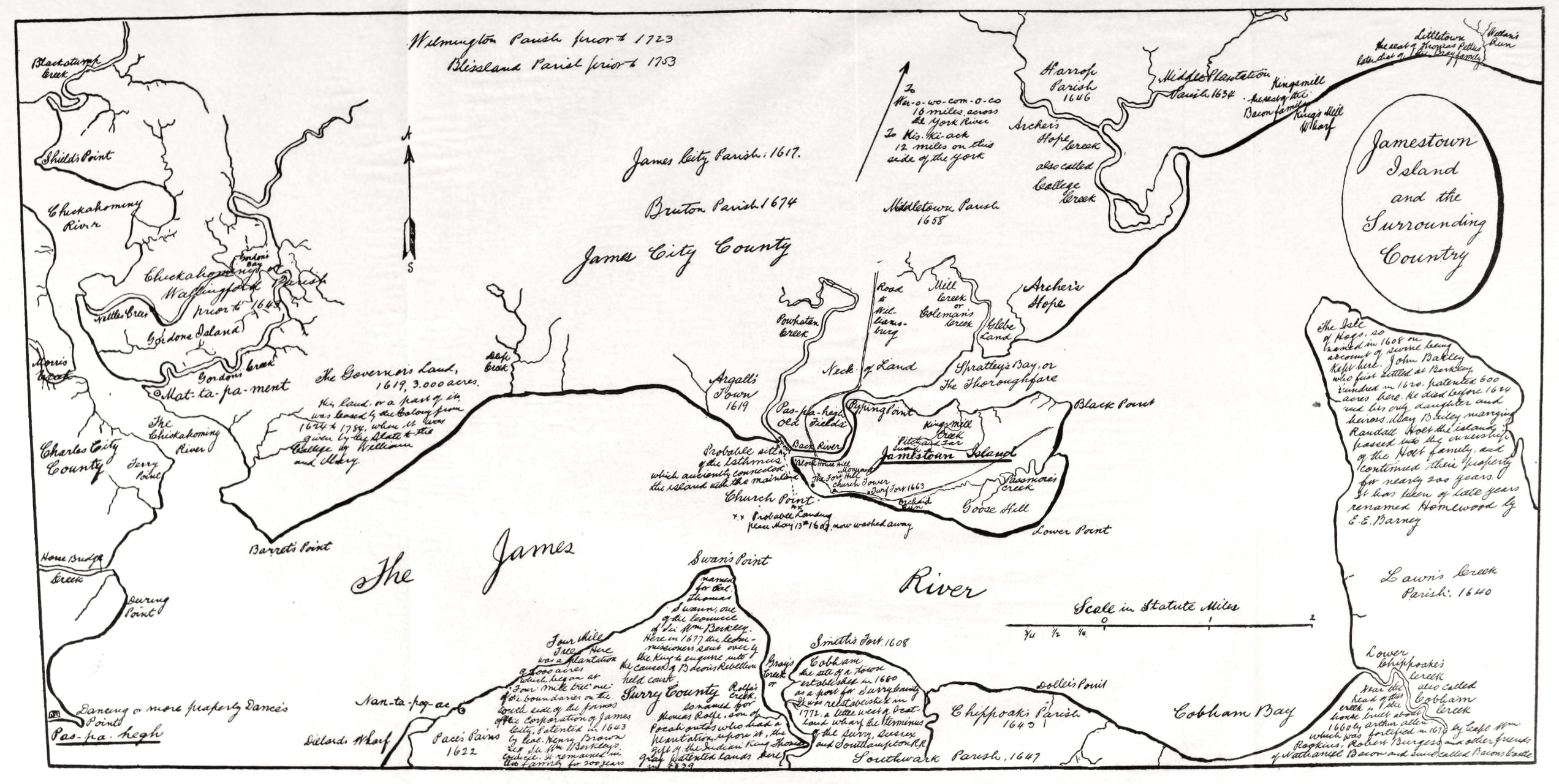
Jamestown Island and the surrounding country

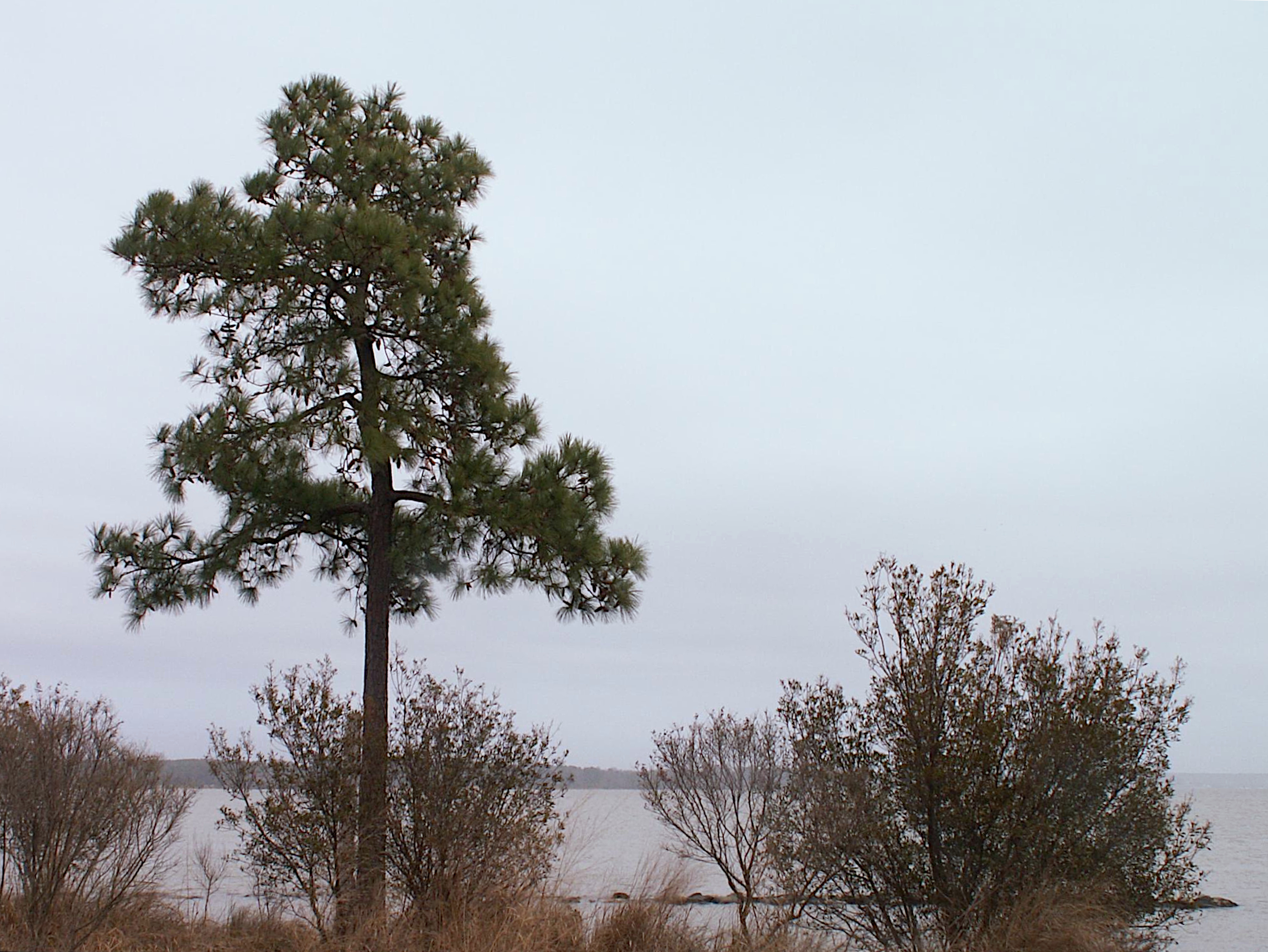
Pine tree with the James River in the background, Jamestown Island

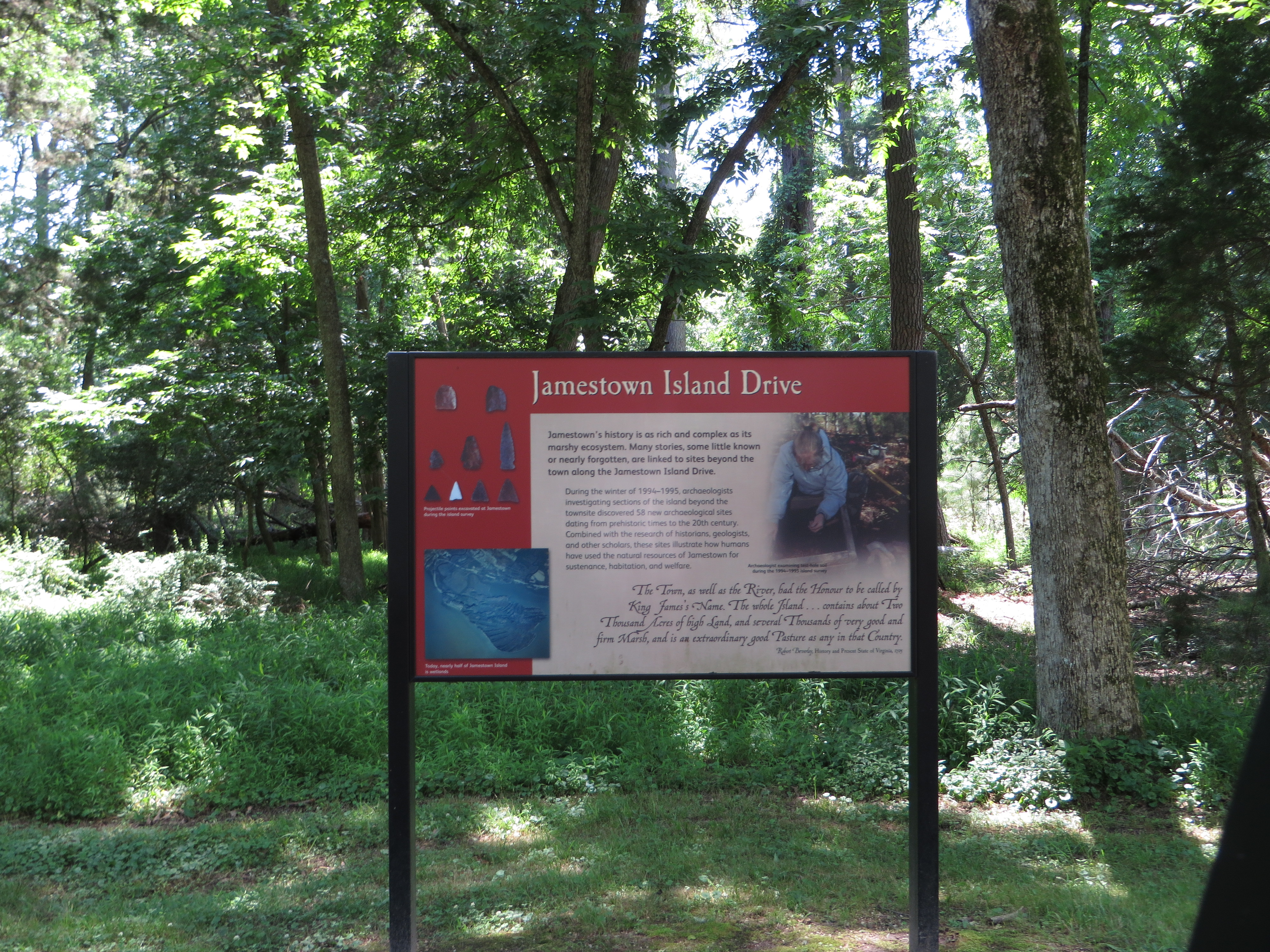
Jamestown Island Drive sign

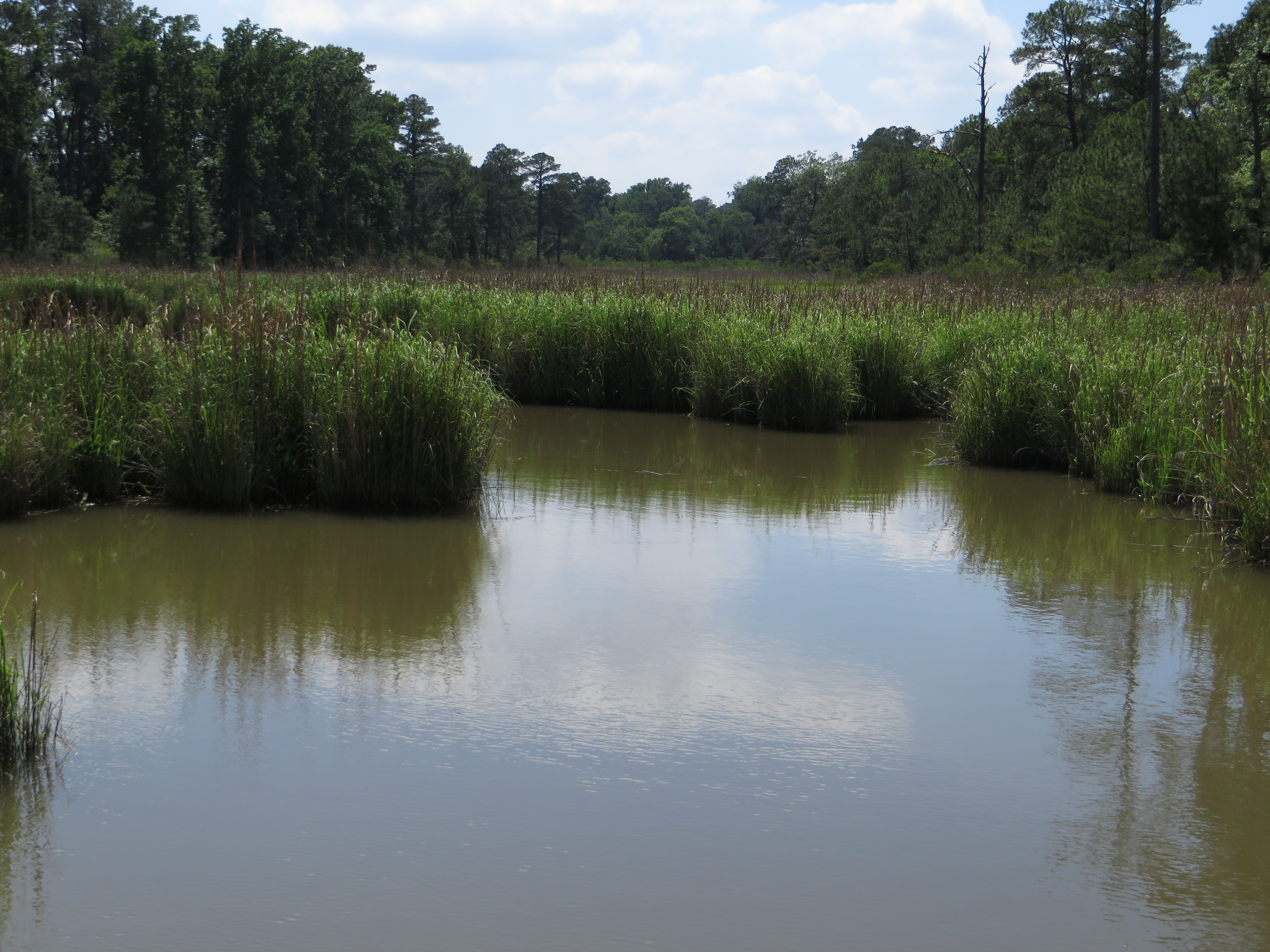
Swamp/marsh seen from Jamestown Island Drive

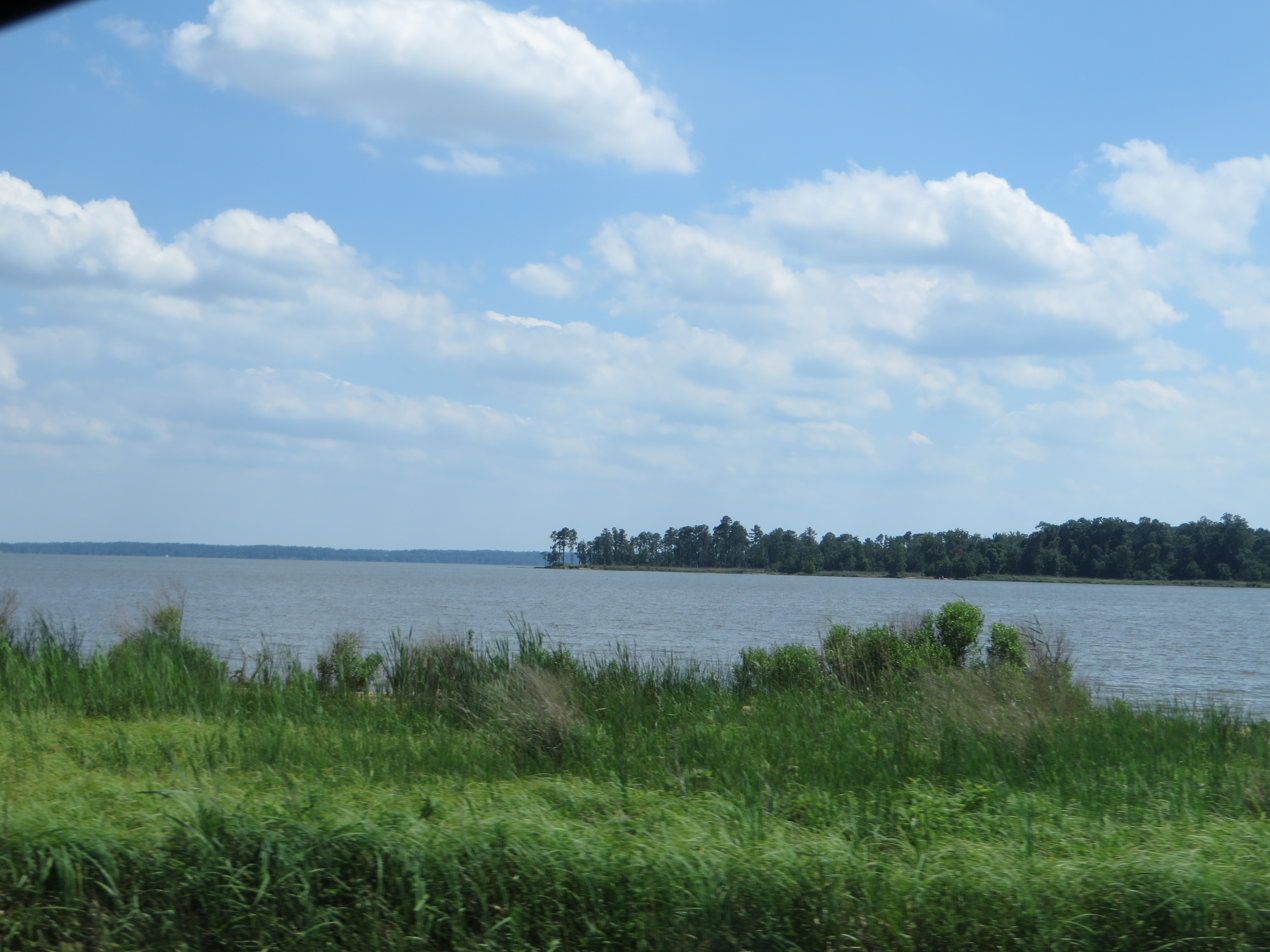
Black Point, Jamestown Island
