= Glass House Point =

Glass House Point in James City County, Virginia is the northern terminus of the Jamestown Ferry, which was relocated there as part of the development of Jamestown for the celebration the 350th anniversary in 1957. The state-operated ferry service crosses the James River to Scotland in Surry County.

It is named for the Jamestown Glasshouse, a popular exhibit at Jamestown operated by the National Park Service.
