= 400th =

400th may refer to:

- 400th anniversary of the Authorized King James Version, set of events and exhibitions in 2011
- 400th Bombardment Group, inactive United States Air Force unit
- 400th Missile Squadron, inactive United States Air Force unit
- America's 400th Anniversary or Jamestown 2007
  - Jamestown 400th Anniversary gold five dollar coin
  - Jamestown 400th Anniversary silver dollar

== See also ==
- 400 (number)
- 400, the year 400 (CD) of the Julian calendar
- 400 BC
