= Virginia Quadricentennial tartan =

Official tartan of the state of Virginia, United States of America

The colors reflect those of the state flower, the dogwood

The Virginia Quadricentennial tartan is an official state tartan of the Commonwealth of Virginia. Originally named "Measure plc", it was designed in 2003 by David McGill of International Tartans for the marketing of several products, including the now defunct Kinmount Scotch Whisky. In 2005, during preparations for Jamestown 2007, which celebrated the 400th anniversary of the founding of the Colony of Virginia, it was selected as Virginia's tartan because the colors reflected those of the American dogwood, the Virginia state flower and tree. It was renamed "Virginia" in 2005, and in 2007 it was made official by Governor Tim Kaine and given its current name.

Thread count: /VLY2 RM8 VLY2 RM4 VLY10 K3 VLY2 K3 VLY20 LT6 VLY10 LT3 VLY40/
Palette: VLY=#FAFA96 yellow; RM=#960032 red; K=#101010 black; LT=#BE7832 brown
