= Little Rock Central High School Desegregation silver dollar =

2007 United States commemorative coin

Little Rock Central High School Desegregation dollar
- United States
- Value: 1 U.S. Dollar
- Mass: 26.73 g
- Diameter: 38.1 mm
- Thickness: 2.58 mm
- Edge: Reeded
- Composition: 90% Ag / 10% Cu
- Years of minting: 2007
- Mintage: 66,093 Uncirculated 124,678 Proof
- Mint marks: P

Obverse
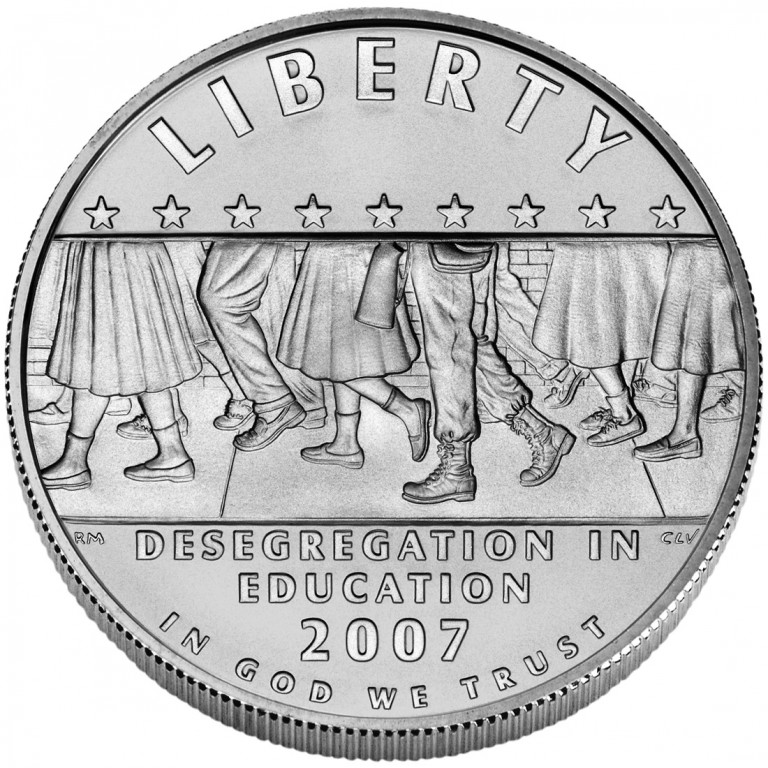
- Design: Feet of the Little Rock Nine escorted by a soldier
- Designer: Richard Alan Masters

Reverse
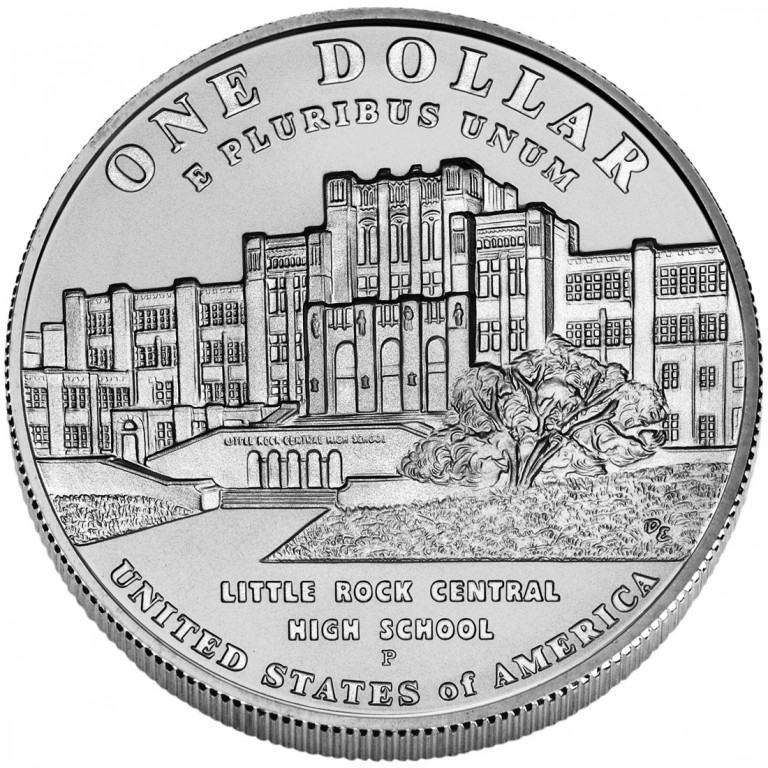
- Design: Little Rock Central High School in 1957
- Designer: Don Everhart

The Little Rock Central High School Desegregation silver dollar is a commemorative coin issued by the United States Mint in 2007. The coin commemorates the desegregation of the Little Rock Central High School in the fall of 1957 when nine African-American students enrolled in the school in compliance with the U.S. Supreme Court decision in Brown v. Board of Education.

== Legislation ==
The Little Rock Central High School Desegregation 50th Anniversary Commemorative Coin Act (Pub. L. 109–146 (text) (PDF)) was enacted into law on December 22, 2005.

== Design ==
The obverse of the coin was designed by Richard Alan Masters and sculpted by Charles L. Vickers. It depicts students walking to school accompanied by an armed soldier with nine stars symbolic of the nine students. The reverse was designed and engraved by Don Everhart and depicts Little Rock Central High School as it was in 1957.

The coin won the Coin of the Year award from Numismatic News for Best Contemporary Event in 2009.

== Production and distribution ==
The Mint began accepting orders on May 15. A surcharge on each coin sold went to the Little Rock Central High School National Historic Site for preservation and restoration. The uncirculated coin was included in a set with a bronze medal also commemorating the Little Rock Nine, designed by Marjorie Williams-Smith. Of the 66,093 mintage total for the uncirculated pieces, 24,925 were sold as part of the coin and medal set. The proof coin was also sold as part of the 2007 America Legacy Set, which included a proof set of all 14 circulating coins of 2007 and the Jamestown 400th Anniversary dollar. Of the 124,678 mintage total for the proof pieces, 26,442 were sold as part of the American Legacy set.

== Collecting ==
While mintage of the coin is relatively low, the coin is readily available in high grades for collectors. Numismatic interest in the coin is low, with Anthony Swiatek describing the obverse as "voyeuristic" and that "the butt of an M1 Garand rifle leaves the viewer with little inspiration."

== See also ==
- List of United States commemorative coins and medals (2000s)
- United States commemorative coins
- Civil rights movement in popular culture
