= Jamestown =

Town and fort established in the Virginia Colony

Jamestown James Towne, James Fort, James Cittie
- Fort (1607) and Town (1619)
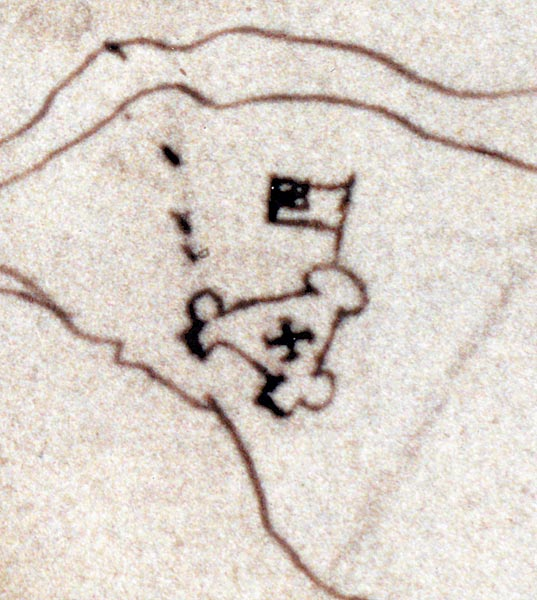
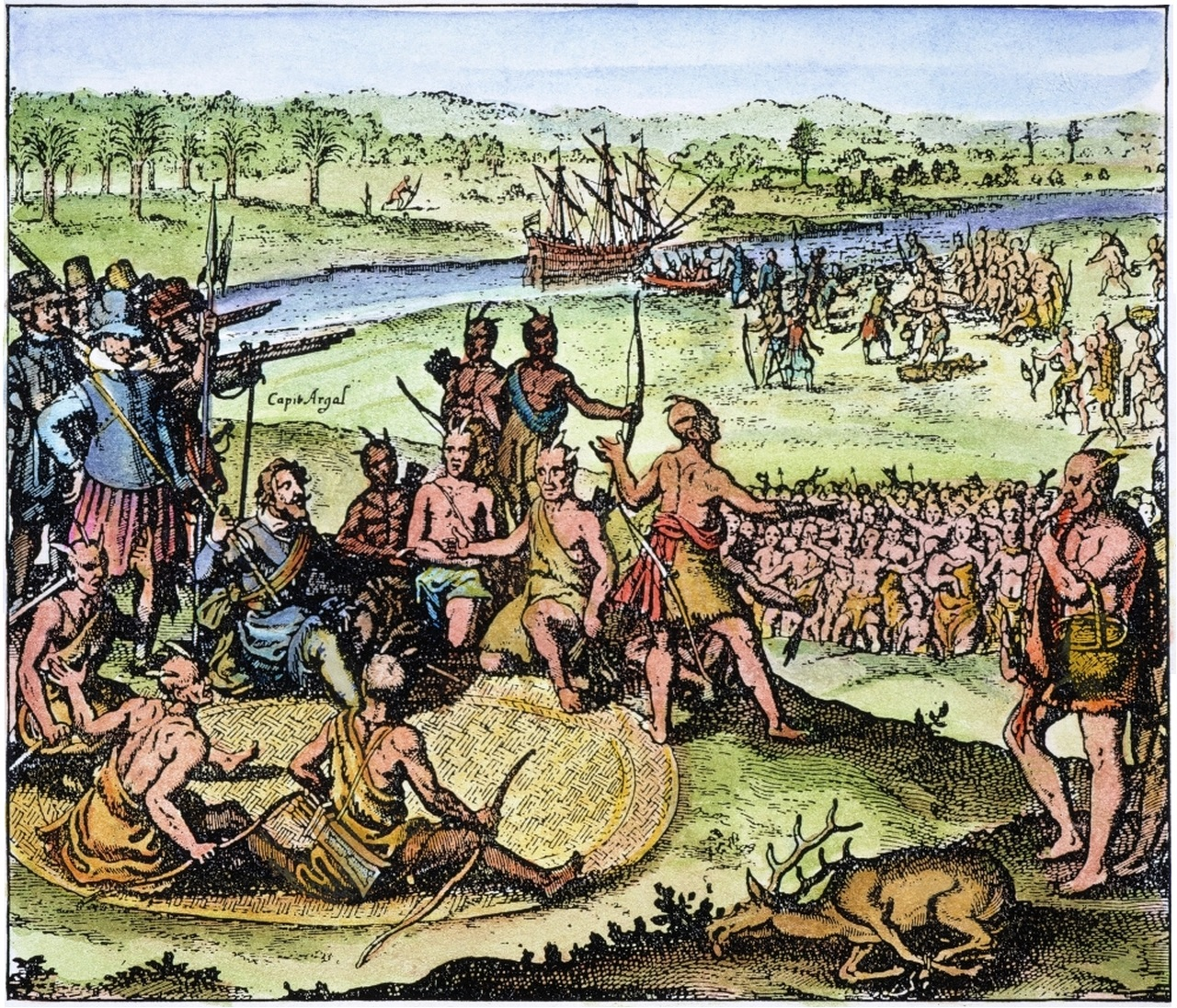
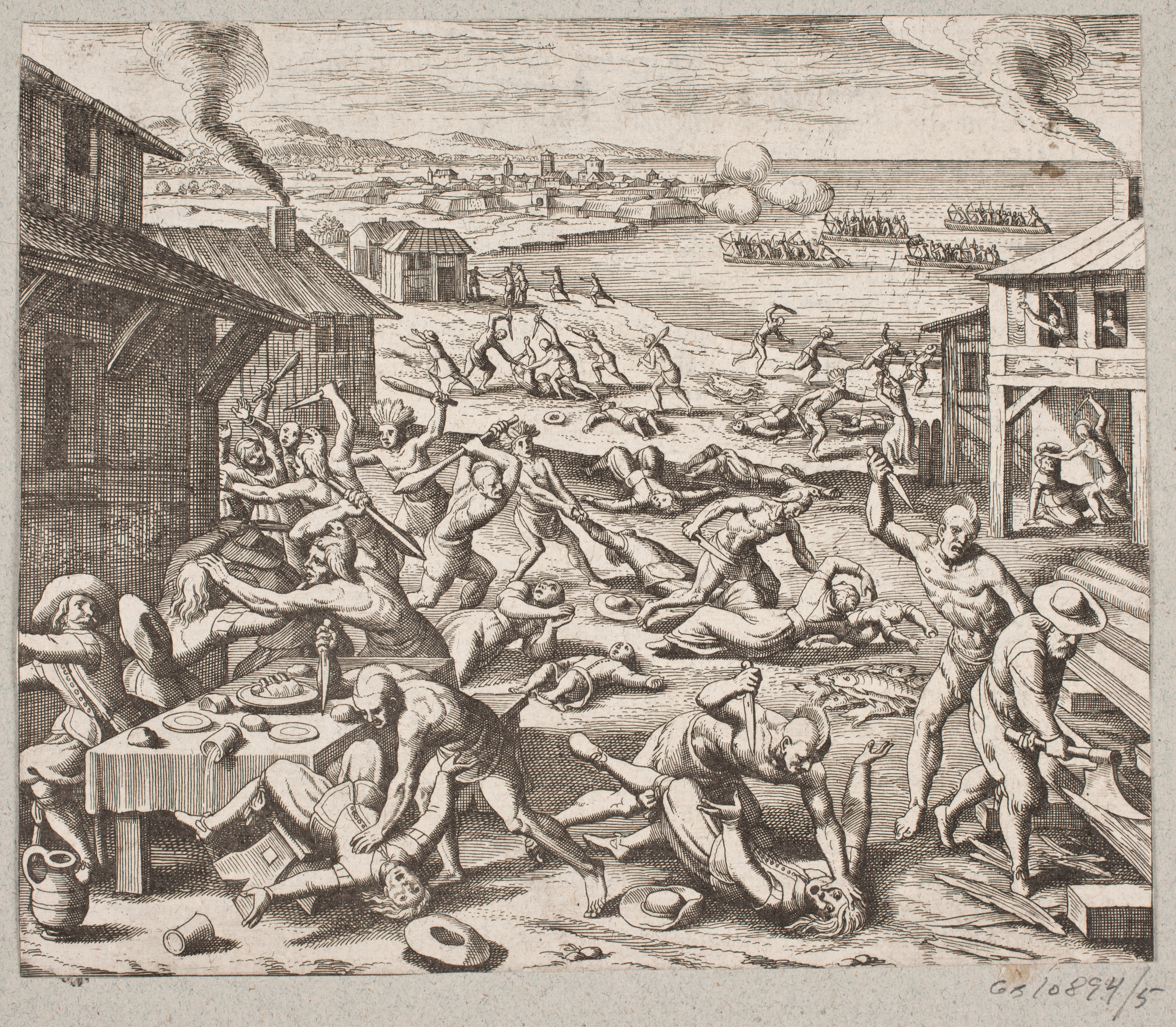
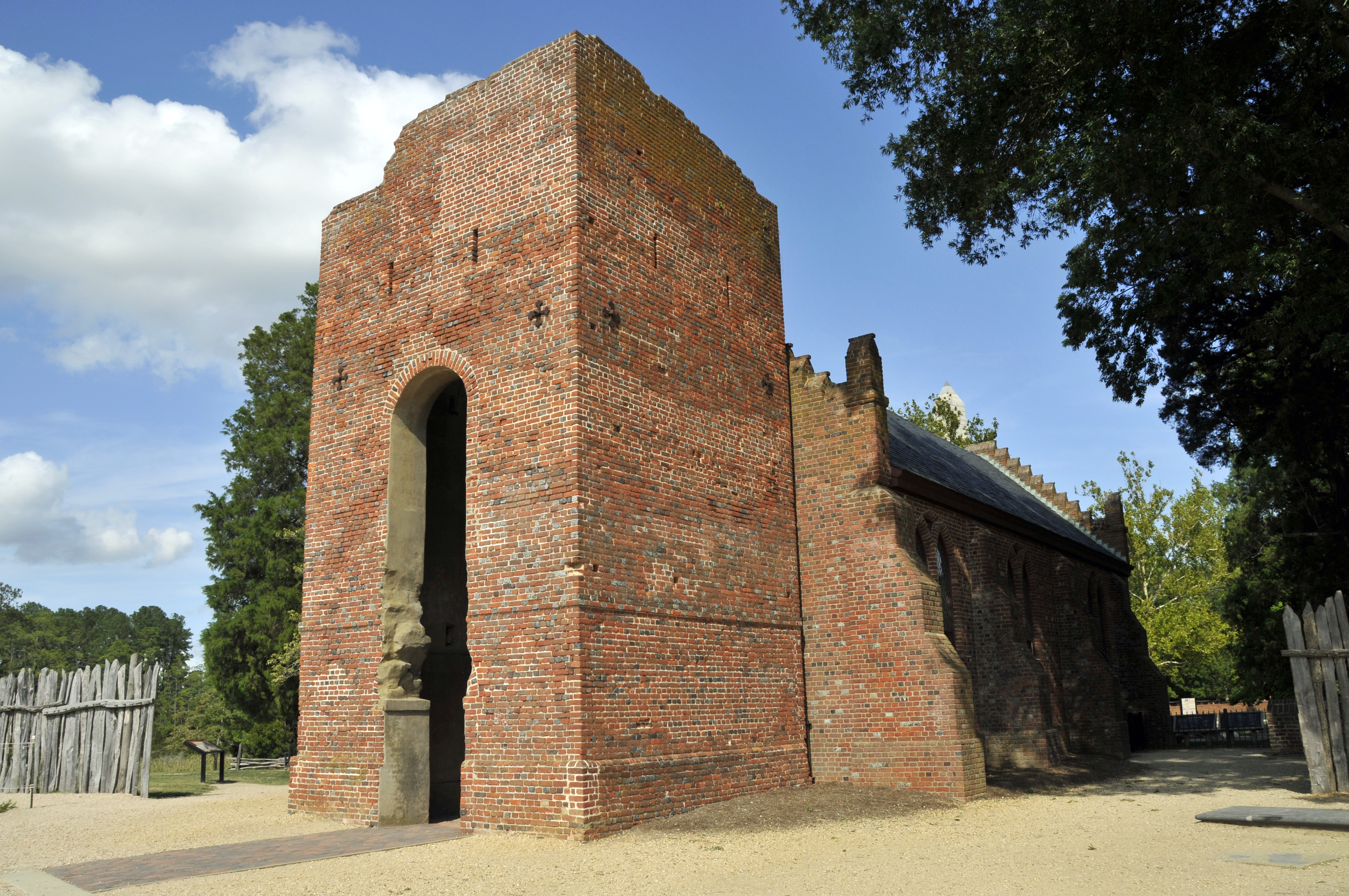
- James Fort (excerpt from Chart of Virginia, c. 1608) Samuel Argall meeting with Chickahominy people, c. 1610 Indian massacre of 1622 Reconstruction of the 1639 Jamestown Church tower

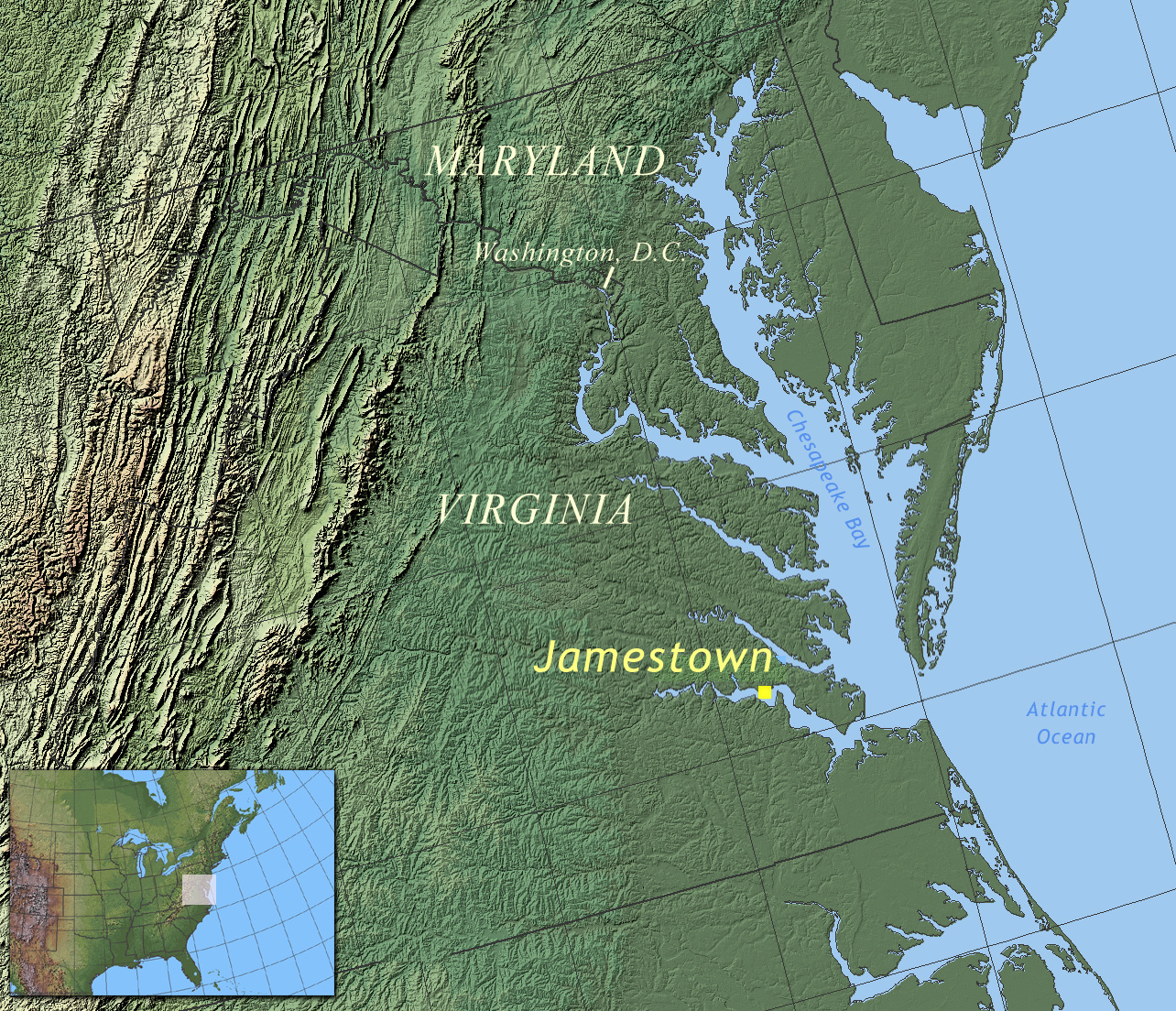
- Location of Jamestown in Virginia

- Location of Jamestown in Virginia Jamestown (the United States)
- Coordinates: 37°12′33″N 76°46′39″W
- Colony: Colony of Virginia
- Established: May 14, 1607; 419 years ago
- Abandoned: Briefly in 1610; again after 1699
- Founder: London Company
- Named for: James I

The Jamestown (Note: Previously also written variously as James Town, James Towne, Jamestowne, and James City.) settlement in the Colony of Virginia was the first permanent English settlement in the Americas. It was located, in what later became James City County, on the northeast bank of the James River, about 2.5 mi (4 km) southwest of present-day Williamsburg. It was established by the Virginia Company of London as "James Fort" on May 4, 1607 O.S. (May 14, 1607 N.S.). It followed earlier, failed English colonization attempts, including the 1585 Roanoke Colony. A river island was selected to evade Spanish naval patrols; however, it was infested with mosquitoes, lacked potable water, and was used by the Paspahegh people. Despite supply missions, only 60 of the original 214 settlers survived the 1609–1610 winter known as Starving Time. In 1612, West Indies tobacco was successfully cultivated, leading to an economic boom for the colony and England.

Jamestown served as the colonial capital from 1616 until 1699. The year 1619 had three seminal events: the first legislative assembly in the New World, a labor strike, and the first recorded African slaves in Virginia colony. The Africans most likely worked in the tobacco fields, under a system of race-based indentured servitude. The modern conception of slavery in the British colonies was formalized in 1640, and fully entrenched in Virginia by 1660.

In 1622, a native uprising decimated the surrounding settlements, but the capital was warned before a decisive attack could occur.

In 1676, Jamestown was deliberately burned during Bacon's Rebellion, though it was rebuilt. In 1699, the colonial capital was moved to present-day Williamsburg, Virginia. In the 18th century, Jamestown ceased to exist as a settlement and remains as an archaeological site, Jamestown Rediscovery, which houses museums and historical sites, including the Jamestown Settlement and the American Revolution Museum in Yorktown. Jamestown is one of three locations composing the Historic Triangle of Colonial Virginia, along with Williamsburg and Yorktown. Historic Jamestowne is the archaeological site on Jamestown Island and is a cooperative effort by Jamestown National Historic Site and Preservation Virginia. Jamestown Settlement, a living history interpretive site, is operated by the Jamestown Yorktown Foundation, a state agency of the Commonwealth of Virginia.

== Settlement ==
Spain, Portugal, and France moved quickly to establish a presence in the New World, while other European countries moved more slowly. The English did not attempt to found colonies until many decades after the explorations of John Cabot, and early efforts were failures—most notably the Roanoke Colony, which vanished about 1590.

=== 1607–1609: Arrival and beginning ===
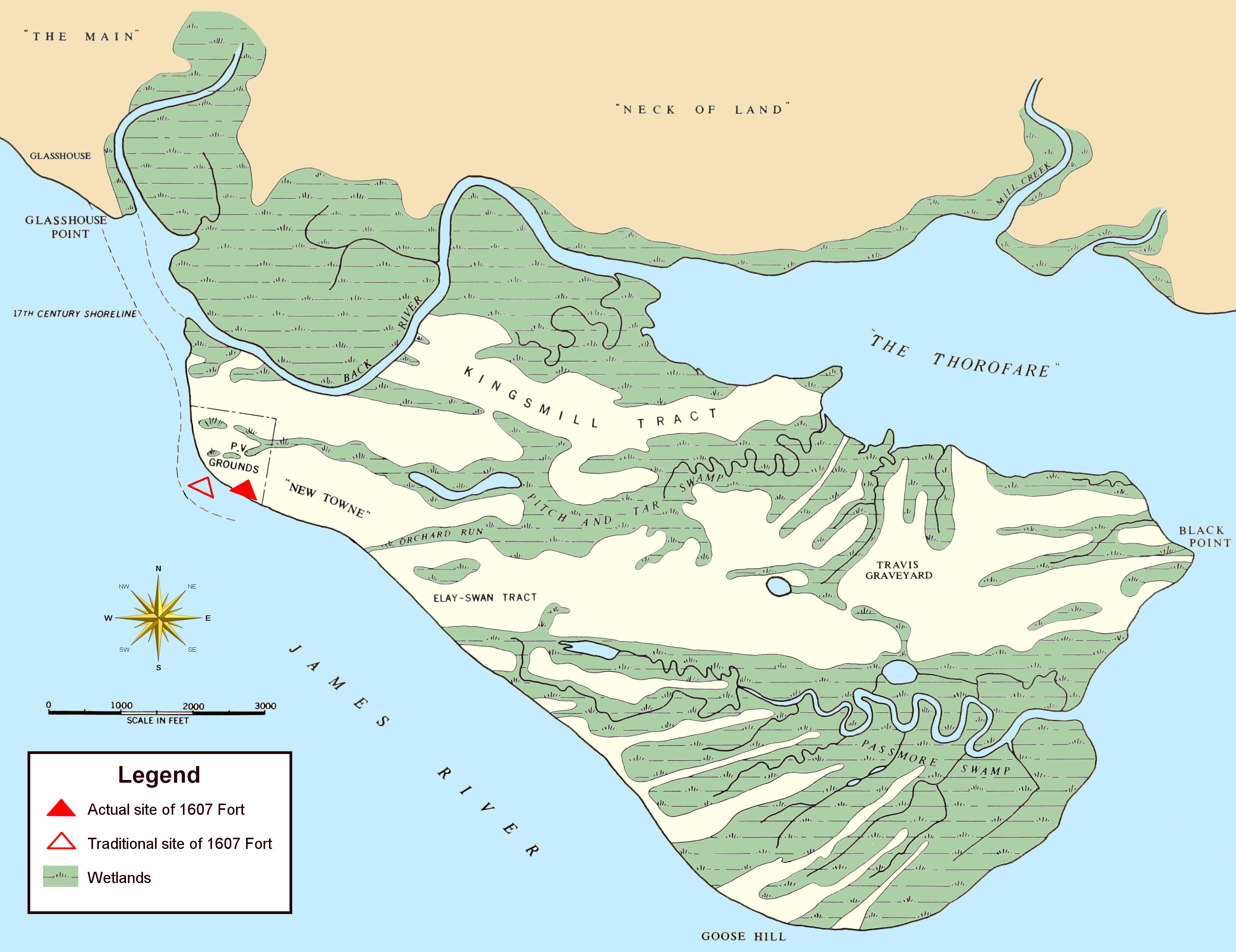
Map of Jamestown Island, showing the terrain and location of the original 1607 fort

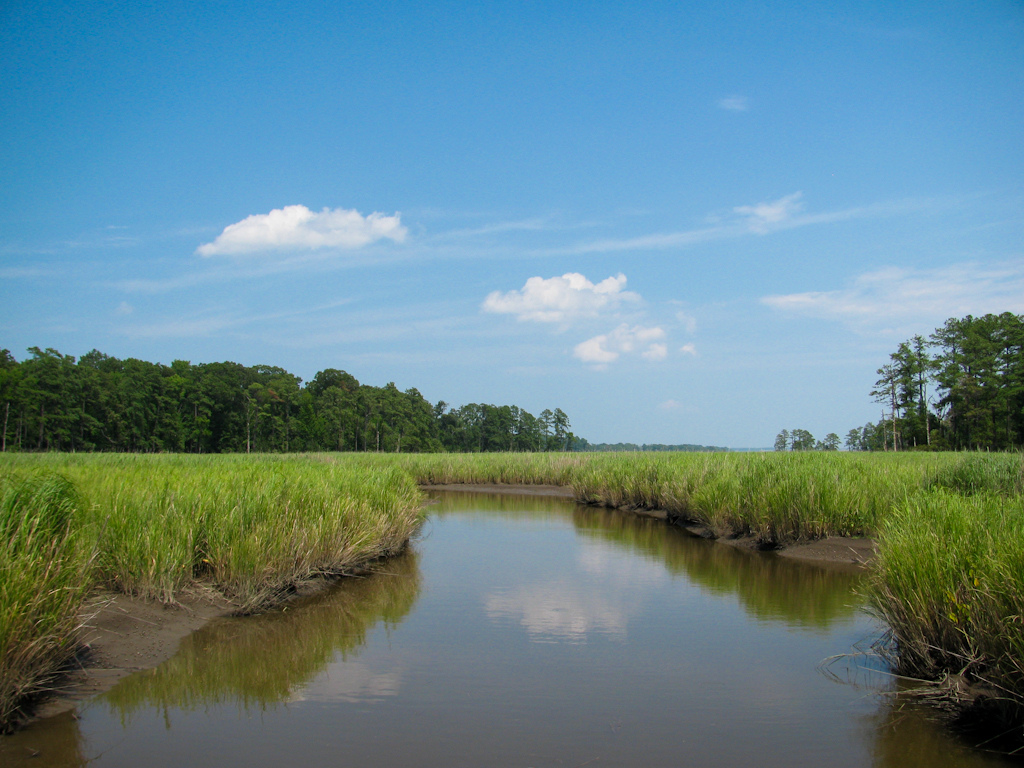
Salt marshes along Jamestown Island; the ample wetlands on the island proved to be a breeding ground for mosquitoes.

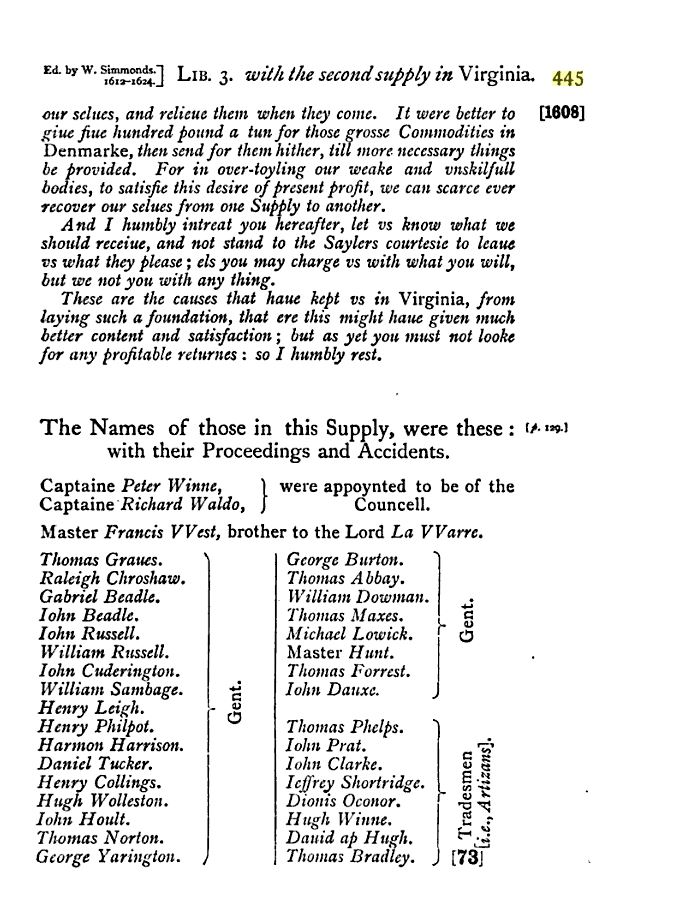
Names of those on the Second Supply – Page 445 (or Page 72) "The Generall Historie of Virginia, New-England, and the Summer Isles", by Capt. John Smith

In 1606, English colonists set sail with a charter from the London Company to establish a colony in the New World. The fleet consisted of the ships Susan Constant, Discovery, and Godspeed, all under the leadership of Captain Christopher Newport. They made a particularly long voyage of four months, including a stop in the Canary Islands, in Spain, and subsequently Puerto Rico, and finally departed for the American mainland on April 10, 1607.

The expedition made landfall on April 26, 1607, at a place which they named Cape Henry. Under orders to select a more secure location, they set about exploring what is now Hampton Roads and an outlet to the Chesapeake Bay which they named the James River in honor of King James I of England. Captain Edward Maria Wingfield was elected president of the governing council on April 25, 1607. On May 14, he selected a piece of land on a large peninsula some 40 miles (64 km) inland from the Atlantic Ocean as a prime location for a fortified settlement. The river channel was a defensible strategic point due to a curve in the river, and it was close to the land, making it navigable and offering enough land for piers or wharves to be built in the future. Perhaps the most favorable fact about the location was that it was uninhabited because the leaders of the nearby indigenous nations considered the site too poor and remote for agriculture. The island was swampy and isolated, and it offered limited space, was plagued by mosquitoes, and afforded only brackish tidal river water unsuitable for drinking.

The Jamestown settlers arrived in Virginia during a severe drought, according to a research study conducted by the Jamestown Archaeological Assessment (JAA) team in the 1990s. The JAA analyzed information from a study conducted in 1985 by David Stahle and others, who obtained drawings of 800-year-old bald cypress trees along the Nottoway and Blackwater rivers. The lifespan of these trees is up to 1,000 years, and their rings offer a good indication of an area's annual amount of rainfall. The borings revealed that the worst drought in 700 years occurred between 1606 and 1612. This severe drought affected the Jamestown colonists and Powhatan tribe's ability to produce food and obtain a safe supply of water.

The settlers also arrived too late in the year to get crops planted. Many in the group were either gentlemen or their manservants, both equally unaccustomed to the hard labor demanded by the harsh task of carving out a viable colony. One of these was Robert Hunt, a former vicar of Reculver, England, who celebrated the first known Anglican Eucharist in the territory of the future United States on June 21, 1607.

Two-thirds of the settlers died before ships arrived in 1608 with supplies and German and Polish craftsmen, who helped to establish the first manufactories in the colony. As a result, glassware became the foremost American products to be exported to Europe at the time. Clapboard had already been sent back to England beginning with the first returning ship.

The delivery of supplies in 1608 on the first and second supply missions of Captain Newport had also added to the number of hungry settlers. It seemed certain at that time that the colony at Jamestown would meet the same fate as earlier English attempts to settle in North America, specifically the Roanoke Colony (Lost Colony) and the Popham Colony, unless there was a major relief effort. The Germans who arrived with the second supply and a few others defected to the Powhatans, with weapons and equipment. The Germans even planned to join a rumored Spanish attack on the colony and urged the Powhatans to join it. The Spanish were driven off by the timely arrival in July 1609 of Captain Samuel Argall in Mary and John, a larger ship than the Spanish reconnaissance ship La Asunción de Cristo. Argall's voyage also prevented the Spanish from gaining knowledge of the weakness of the colony. Don Pedro de Zúñiga, the Spanish ambassador to England, desperately sought this information—along with spies—to persuade Philip III to authorize an attack on the colony.

The investors of the Virginia Company of London expected to reap rewards from their speculative investments. With the second supply, they expressed their frustrations and made demands upon the leaders of Jamestown in written form. They specifically demanded that the colonists send commodities sufficient to pay the cost of the voyage, a lump of gold, assurance that they had found the South Sea, and one member of the lost Roanoke Colony. It fell to the third president of the council, Captain John Smith, to deliver a bold and much-needed wake-up call in response to the investors in London, demanding practical laborers and craftsmen who could help make the colony more self-sufficient.

=== 1609–1610: Starving Time and third supply ===
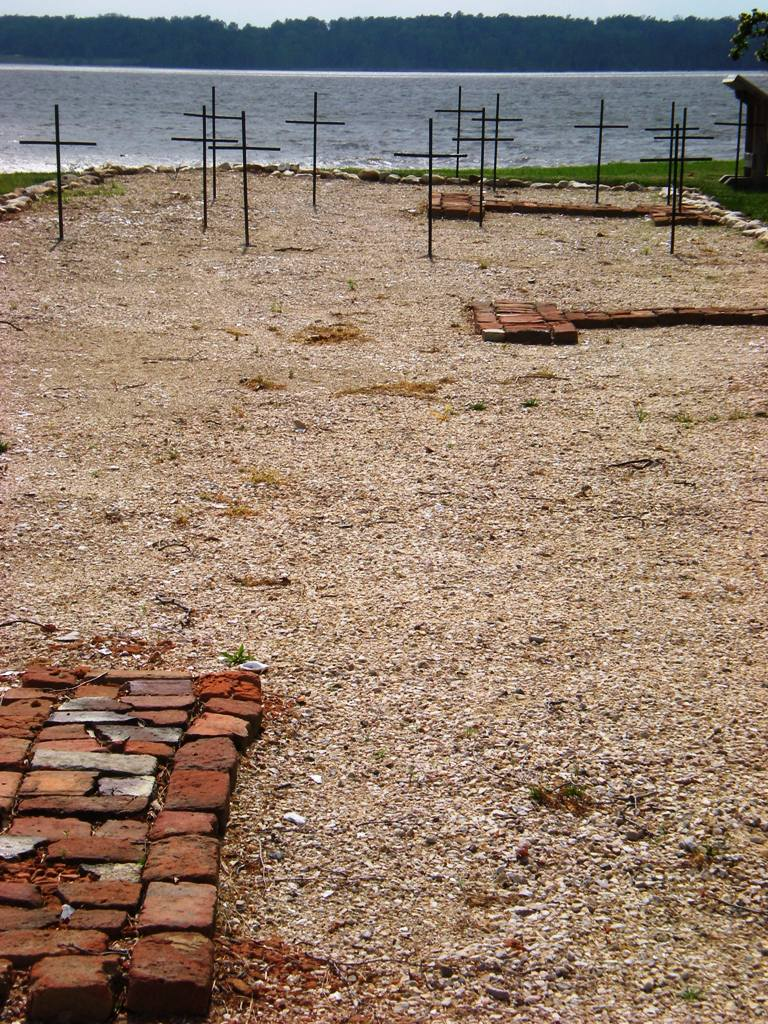
A mass grave at Jamestown beneath the foundations of the later capitol buildings, which was later discovered by archaeologists

After Smith was forced to return to England because of an explosion which gave him deep burn wounds during a trading expedition, the colony was led by George Percy, who proved incompetent in negotiating with the native tribes. There are indications that those in London comprehended and embraced Smith's message. The third supply mission of 1609 was by far the largest and best equipped. They also had a new purpose-built flagship, Sea Venture, constructed and placed in the most experienced of hands, Christopher Newport.

On June 2, 1609, Sea Venture set sail from Plymouth, England, as the flagship of a seven-ship fleet (towing two additional pinnaces) destined for Jamestown as part of the third supply mission, carrying 214 settlers. On July 24, the fleet ran into a strong storm, likely a hurricane, and the ships were separated. Although some of the ships did make it to Jamestown, the leaders and most of the supplies had been aboard Sea Venture, which fought the storm for three days before the Admiral of the company, Sir George Somers, deliberately drove it onto the reefs of Bermuda to prevent its foundering. This allowed all aboard to be landed safely. The survivors (including Lieutenant-General Sir Thomas Gates, Captain Christopher Newport, Silvester Jourdain, Stephen Hopkins—later of Mayflower—and secretary William Strachey) were stranded on Bermuda for approximately nine months. During that time, they built two new ships, the pinnaces Deliverance and Patience. The original plan was to build only one vessel, Deliverance, but it soon became evident that it would not be large enough to carry the settlers and all of the food (salted pork) that was being sourced on the islands.

While the third supply was stranded in Bermuda, the colony at Jamestown was in even worse shape. The settlers faced rampant starvation for want of additional provisions. During this time, lack of food drove people to eat dogs, snakes and even boiled leather from shoes for sustenance. Only 60 of the original 214 settlers at Jamestown survived. There is historical and scientific evidence that the settlers at Jamestown had turned to cannibalism during the starving time.

The ships from Bermuda arrived in Jamestown on May 23, 1610. Many of the surviving colonists were near death, and Jamestown was judged to be unviable. Everyone was boarded onto Deliverance and Patience, which set sail for England. However, on June 10, 1610, the timely arrival of another relief fleet, bearing Governor Thomas West, 3rd Baron De La Warr (who would eventually give his name to the colony of Delaware), which met the two ships as they descended the James River, granted Jamestown a reprieve. The colonists called this The Day of Providence. The fleet brought supplies and additional settlers. All the settlers returned to the colony, though there was still a critical shortage of food.

Relations between the colonists and the Powhatans quickly deteriorated after De La Warr's arrival, eventually leading to conflict. The Anglo-Powhatan War lasted until Samuel Argall captured Wahunsenacawh's daughter Matoaka, better known by her nickname Pocahontas, after which the chief accepted a treaty of peace.

=== 1610–1624: Rising fortunes ===
Due to the aristocratic backgrounds of many of the colonists, a historic drought and the communal nature of their workload, progress through the first few years was inconsistent. By 1613, six years after Jamestown's founding, the organizers and shareholders of the Virginia Company were desperate to increase the efficiency and profitability of the struggling colony. Without stockholder consent the Governor, Sir Thomas Dale, assigned 3-acre (12,000 m^{2}) plots to its "ancient planters" and smaller plots to the settlement's later arrivals. Measurable economic progress was made, and the settlers began expanding their planting to land belonging to local native tribes. That this turnaround coincided with the end of a drought that had begun the year before the English settlers' arrival probably indicates multiple factors were involved besides the colonists' ineptitude.

Among the colonists who survived the Starving Time was John Rolfe, who carried with him a cache of untested tobacco seeds from Bermuda, which had grown wild there after being planted by shipwrecked Spaniards years before. In 1614, Rolfe began to successfully harvest tobacco. Prosperous and wealthy, he married Pocahontas, bringing several years of peace between the English and natives. However, at the end of a public relations trip to England, Pocahontas became sick and died on March 21, 1617. The following year, her father also died. Powhatan's brother, a fierce warrior named Opechancanough, became head of the Powhatan Confederacy. As the English continued to appropriate more land for tobacco farming, relations with the natives worsened.

Because of the high cost of the trans-Atlantic voyage at this time, many English settlers came to Jamestown as indentured servants: in exchange for the passage, room, board, and the promise of land or money, these immigrants would agree to work for three to seven years. Immigrants from continental Europe, mainly Germans, were usually redemptioners—they purchased some portion of their voyage on credit and, upon arrival, borrowed or entered into a work contract to pay the remainder of their voyage costs.

In 1619, the first representative assembly in America, the General Assembly, convened in the Jamestown Church, "to establish one equal and uniform government over all Virginia" which would provide "just laws for the happy guiding and governing of the people there inhabiting." Initially, only men of English origin were permitted to vote. On June 30, 1619, in what was the first recorded strike in Colonial America, the Polish artisans protested and refused to work if not allowed to vote. On July 21, 1619, the court granted the Poles equal voting rights. Afterwards, the labor strike was ended, and the artisans resumed their work. Individual land ownership was also instituted, and the colony was divided into four large "boroughs" or "incorporations" called "citties" by the colonists. Jamestown was located in James Cittie.

Of the first documented African slaves to arrive in English North America, on the frigate White Lion in August 1619, were an African man and woman, later named Antoney and Isabella. Listed in the 1624 census in Virginia, they became the first African family recorded in Jamestown. Their baby, named William Tucker, became the first documented African child baptized in British North America. Another of the early enslaved Africans to be purchased at the settlement was Angela, who worked for Captain William Peirce.

After several years of strained coexistence, Chief Opechancanough and his Powhatan Confederacy attempted to eliminate the English colony once and for all. On the morning of March 22, 1622, they attacked outlying plantations and communities up and down the James River in what became known as the Indian massacre of 1622. More than 300 settlers were killed in the attack, about a third of the colony's English-speaking population. Dale's development at Henricus, which was to feature a college to educate the natives, and Wolstenholme Towne at Martin's Hundred, were both essentially wiped out. Jamestown was spared only through a timely warning by a Virginia Indian employee. There was not enough time to spread the word to the outposts.

Of the 6,000 people who came to the settlement between 1608 and 1624, only 3,400 survived.

=== 1624–1699: Later years ===
In 1624, King James revoked the Virginia Company's charter, and Virginia became a crown colony. Despite the setbacks, the colony continued to grow. Ten years later, in 1634, by order of King Charles I, the colony was divided into the original eight shires of Virginia, in a fashion similar to that practiced in England. Jamestown was located in James City Shire, soon renamed the "County of James City", better known in modern times as James City County, Virginia, the nation's oldest county.

Another large-scale "Indian attack" occurred in 1644. In 1646 Opechancanough was captured, and while he was in custody a setter assigned to guard him shot him in the back against orders. Subsequently, the Powhatan Confederacy began to decline. Opechancanough's successor signed the first peace treaties between the Powhatan and the colonists, requiring the former to pay yearly tribute to the latter and be confined to reservations.

A generation later, during Bacon's Rebellion in 1676, Jamestown was burned and eventually rebuilt. During its recovery, the Virginia legislature met first at Governor William Berkeley's nearby Green Spring Plantation, and later at Middle Plantation, which had been started in 1632 as a fortified community inland on the Virginia Peninsula, about 8 miles (13 km) distant. When the statehouse burned again in 1698, this time accidentally, the legislature again temporarily relocated to Middle Plantation and was able to meet in the new facilities of the College of William & Mary, which had been established after receiving a royal charter in 1693. Rather than rebuilding at Jamestown again, the capital of the colony was moved permanently to Middle Plantation in 1699. The town was renamed Williamsburg, to honor the reigning monarch, King William III. A capitol building and "Governor's Palace" were erected there in the following years.

== Aftermath and preservation ==
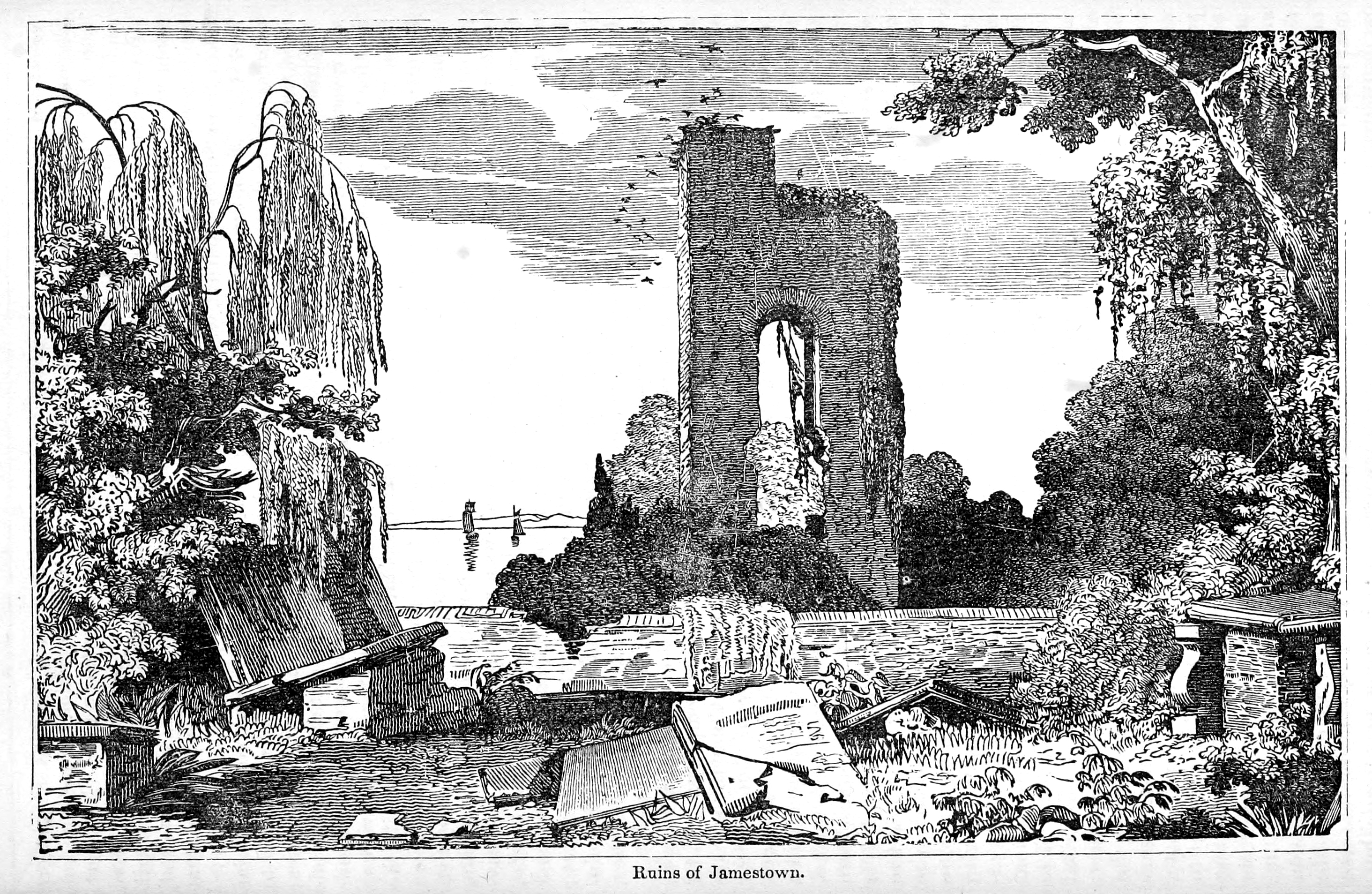
An 1854 image of the ruins of Jamestown showing the tower of the old Jamestown Church, built in the 17th century

After the move of the capital to Williamsburg, Jamestown declined. Those who lived in the general area attended services at Jamestown's church until the 1750s, when it was abandoned. By the mid-18th century, the land was heavily cultivated, primarily by the Travis and Ambler families. In 1831, David Bullock purchased Jamestown from the Travis and Ambler families.

=== American Civil War ===
During the American Civil War, in 1861 Confederate William Allen, who owned the Jamestown Island, occupied Jamestown with troops he raised at his own expense with the intention of blockading the James River and Richmond from the Union Navy. He was joined by Lieutenant Catesby ap Roger Jones, who directed the building of batteries and conducted ordnance and armor tests for the first Confederate ironclad warship, CSS Virginia, which was under construction at the Gosport Naval Shipyard in Portsmouth in late 1861 and early 1862. Jamestown had a peak force of 1,200 men.

During the Peninsula campaign, which began later that spring, Union forces under General George B. McClellan moved up the peninsula from Fort Monroe in an attempt to capture the Confederate capital of Richmond. The Union forces captured Yorktown in April 1862, and the Battle of Williamsburg was fought the following month. With these developments, Jamestown and the lower James River were abandoned by the Confederates. Some of the forces from Jamestown and the crew of Virginia relocated to Drewry's Bluff, a fortified and strategic position high above the river about 8 miles (13 km) below Richmond. There they successfully blocked the Union Navy from reaching the Confederate capital.

Once in Federal hands, Jamestown became a meeting place for runaway slaves, who burned the Ambler house, an 18th-century plantation house, which along with the old church was one of the few remaining signs of old Jamestown. When Allen sent men to assess the damage in late 1862, they were killed by the former slaves. Following the Confederate surrender at Appomattox Courthouse, the oath of allegiance was administered to former Confederate soldiers at Jamestown.

=== Preservation and early archaeology ===
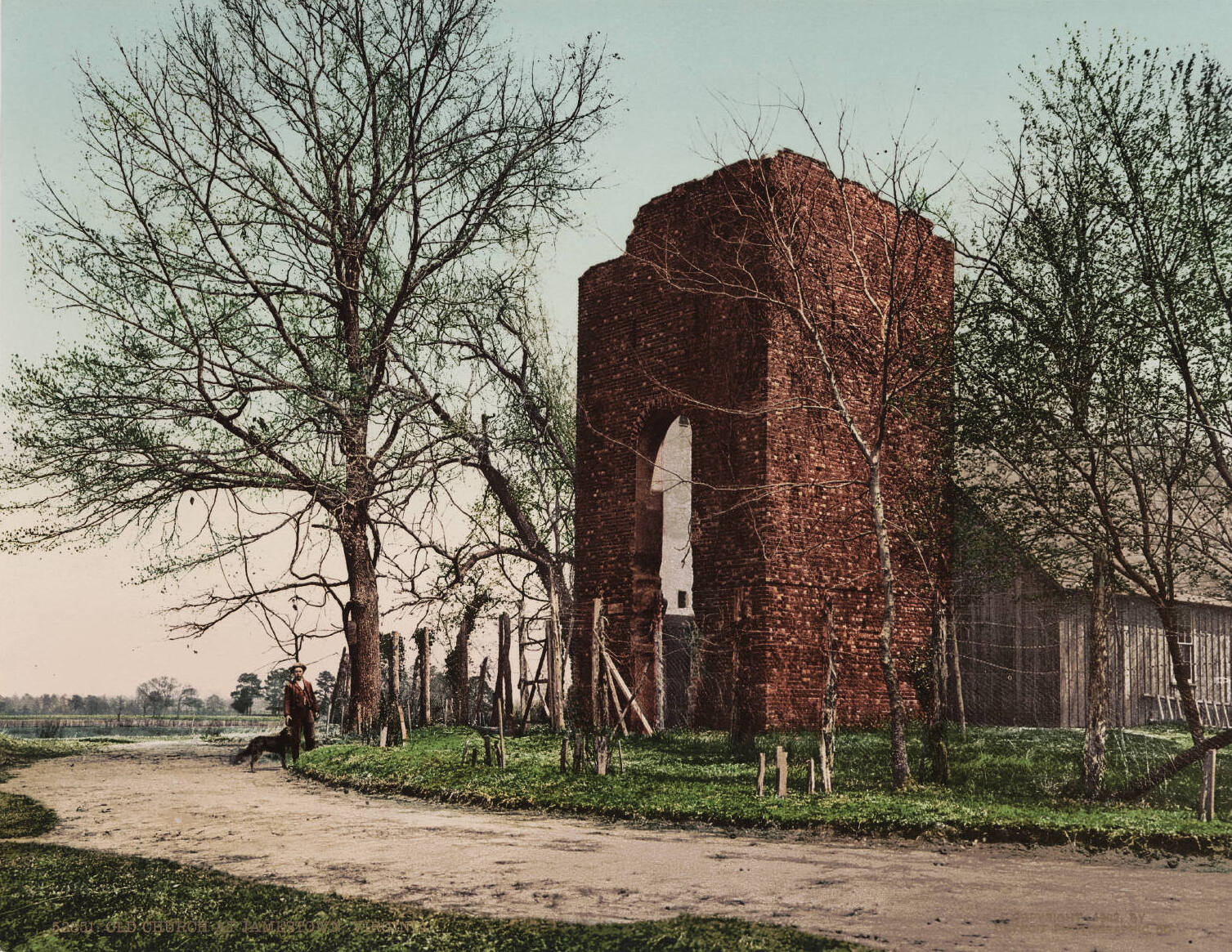
Ruins of Jamestown Church at the turn of the 20th century, prior to the Tercentennial in 1907

In the years after the Civil War, Jamestown became quiet and peaceful once again. In 1892, Jamestown was purchased by Edward Barney. The following year, Barney donated 22½ acres of land, including the ruined church tower, to the Association for the Preservation of Virginia Antiquities, now known as Preservation Virginia. By this time, erosion from the river had eaten away the island's western shore. Visitors began to conclude that the site of James Fort lay completely underwater. With federal assistance, a sea wall was constructed in 1900 to protect the area from further erosion. The archaeological remains of the original 1607 fort, which had been protected by the sea wall, were not discovered until 1996.

In 1932, George Craghead Gregory of Richmond was credited with discovering the foundation of the first brick statehouse (capitol) building, circa 1646, at Jamestown on the land owned by Preservation Virginia. Around 1936, Gregory, who was active with the Virginia Historical Society, founded the Jamestowne Society for descendants of stockholders in the Virginia Company of London and the descendants of those who owned land or who had domiciles in Jamestown or on Jamestown Island prior to 1700.

Colonial National Monument was authorized and established by the U.S. Congress in 1930. In 1934, the National Park Service obtained the remaining 1,500 acres (610 hectares) portion of Jamestown Island which had been under private ownership by the Vermillion family. The National Park Service partnered with Preservation Virginia to preserve the area and present it to visitors in an educational manner. On June 5, 1936, the national monument was re-designated a national historical park and became known as Colonial National Historical Park.

Beginning in 1936, J.C. Harrington worked on the NPS's excavations at Jamestown. In 1954, John L. Cotter took charge of field projects at Jamestown, conducted with the site's 350th anniversary (1957) in mind. Cotter worked with Edward B. Jelks and Harrington to survey the area's colonial sites. In 1957 Cotter and J. Paul Hudson co-authored New Discoveries at Jamestown. Cotter contributed, along with Jelks, Georg Neumann, and Johnny Hack, to the 1958 report Archaeological Excavations at Jamestown.

In the present time, as part of the Colonial National Historical Park, the Jamestown Island area is home to two heritage tourism sites related to the original fort and town. Nearby, the Jamestown-Scotland Ferry service provides a link across the navigable portion of the James River for vehicles and affords passengers a view of Jamestown Island from the river.

=== Historic Jamestowne ===
In 1996, Historic Jamestowne gained renewed importance when the Jamestown Rediscovery project began excavations in search of the original James Fort site, originally in preparation for the quadricentennial of Jamestown's founding. The primary goal of the archaeological campaign was to locate archaeological remains of "the first years of settlement at Jamestown, especially of the earliest fortified town; [and the] subsequent growth and development of the town".

Visitors to Historic Jamestowne can view the site of the original 1607 James Fort, the 17th-century church tower and the site of the 17th-century town, as well as tour an archaeological museum called the Archaearium and view many of the close to two million artifacts found by Jamestown Rediscovery. They also may participate in living history ranger tours and archaeological tours given by the Jamestown Rediscovery staff. Visitors can also often observe archaeologists from the Jamestown Rediscovery Project at work, as archaeological work at the site continues. As of 2014, the archaeological work and studies are ongoing. In addition to their newsletter and website, new discoveries are frequently reported in the local newspaper, the Virginia Gazette based in nearby Williamsburg, and by other news media, often worldwide.

=== Jamestown Settlement ===
Jamestown Settlement is a living-history park and museum located 1.25 miles (2.01 km) from the original location of the colony and adjacent to Jamestown Island. Initially created for the celebration of the 350th anniversary in 1957, Jamestown Settlement is operated by the Jamestown-Yorktown Foundation, and largely sponsored by the Commonwealth of Virginia. The museum complex features a reconstruction of a Powhatan village, the James Fort as it was c. 1610–1614, and seagoing replicas of the three ships that brought the first settlers, Susan Constant, Godspeed, Discovery.

== Commemorations ==
With the national independence of the United States established by the end of the 18th century, Jamestown came to be looked at as a starting point. Its founding in 1607 has been regularly commemorated, with the most notable events being held every fifty years.

=== 200th anniversary ===
The bicentennial of Jamestown on May 13–14, 1807, was called the Grand National Jubilee. Over 3,000 people attended the event, many arriving on vessels which anchored in the river off the island. May 13 was the opening day of the festival, which began with a procession which marched to the graveyard of the old church, where the attending bishop delivered the prayer. The procession then moved to the Travis mansion, where the celebrants dined and danced in the mansion that evening. Also during the festivities, students of the College of William & Mary gave orations. An old barn on the island was used as a temporary theater, where a company of players from Norfolk performed. Attending were many dignitaries, politicians, and historians. The celebration concluded on May 14 with a dinner and toast at the Raleigh Tavern in Williamsburg.

=== 250th anniversary (1857) ===
In 1857, the Jamestown society organized a celebration marking the 250th anniversary of Jamestown's founding. According to the Richmond Enquirer, the site for the celebration was on 10 acres (40,000 m^{2}) on the spot where some of the colonists' houses were originally built. However, it is also speculated that the celebration was moved further east on the island closer to the Travis grave site, in order to avoid damaging Major William Allen's corn fields.

The attendance was estimated at between 6,000 and 8,000 people. Sixteen large steam ships anchored offshore in the James River and were gaily decorated with streamers. Former US President John Tyler of nearby Sherwood Forest Plantation gave a 2½ hour speech, and there were military displays, a grand ball and fireworks.

=== 300th anniversary (1907): Jamestown Exposition ===
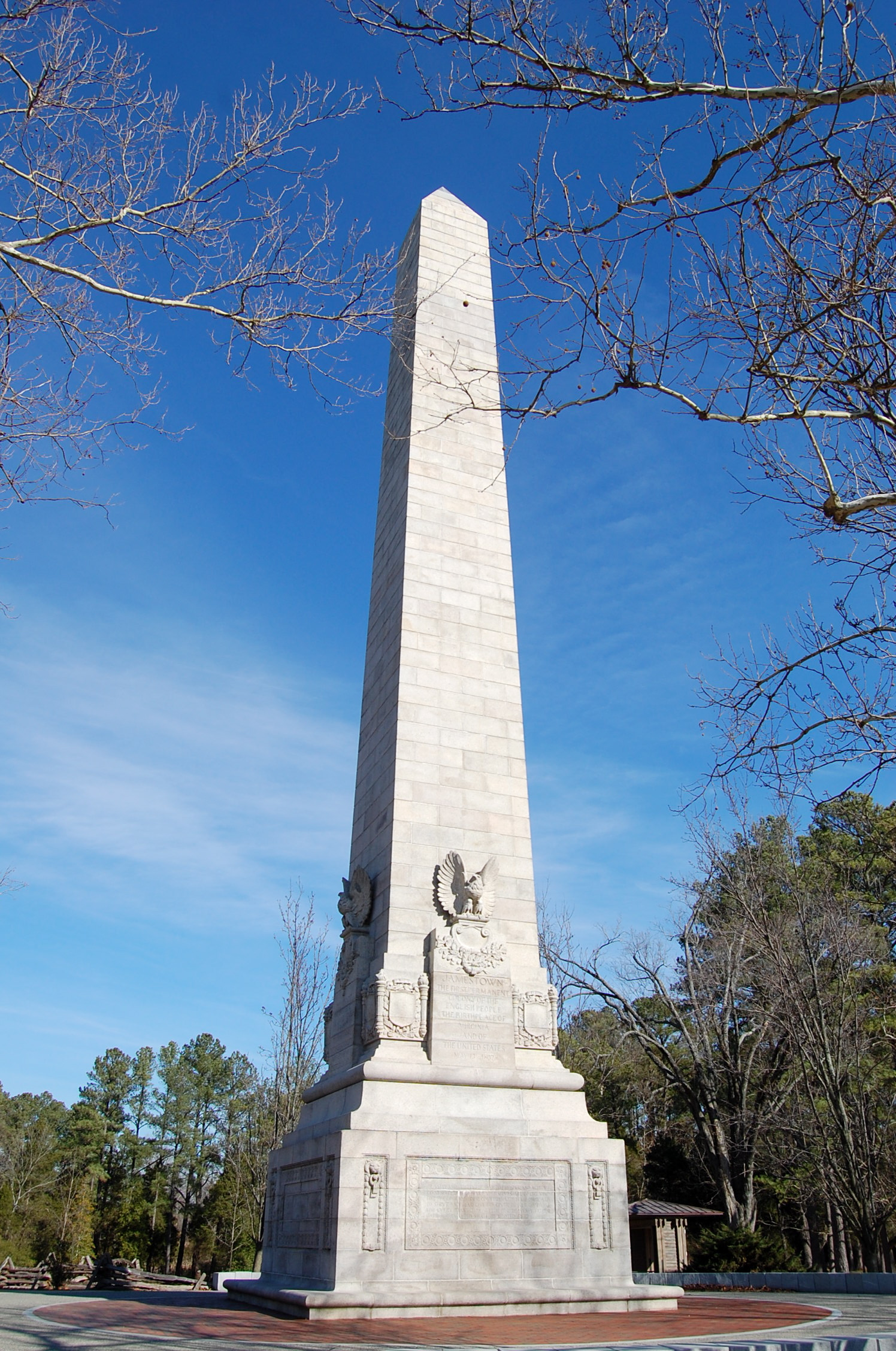
The Jamestown Tercentenary Monument, erected on Jamestown Island in 1907, which stands 103 feet (31 m) tall

The 100th anniversary of the Surrender at Yorktown in 1781 had generated a new interest in the historical significance of the colonial sites of the Peninsula. Williamsburg, a sleepy but populated town of shops and homes, was still celebrating Civil War events. However, as the new century dawned, thoughts turned to the upcoming 300th anniversary of the founding of Jamestown. The Association for the Preservation of Virginia Antiquities (now known as Preservation Virginia) started the movement in 1900 by calling for a celebration honoring the establishment of the first permanent English colony in the New World at Jamestown to be held on the 300th anniversary in 1907.

As a celebration was planned, virtually no one thought that the actual isolated and long-abandoned original site of Jamestown would be suitable for a major event because Jamestown Island had no facilities for large crowds. The original fort housing the Jamestown settlers was believed to have been long ago swallowed by the James River. The general area in James City County near Jamestown was also considered unsuitable, as it was not very accessible in the day of rail travel before automobiles were common.

As the tricentennial of the 1607 Founding of the Jamestown neared, around 1904, despite an assumption in some quarters that Richmond would be a logical location, leaders in Norfolk began a campaign to have a celebration held there. The decision was made to locate the international exposition on a mile-long frontage at Sewell's Point near the mouth of Hampton Roads. This was about 30 miles (48 km) downstream from Jamestown in a rural section of Norfolk County. It was a site which could become accessible by both long-distance passenger railroads and local streetcar service, with considerable frontage on the harbor of Hampton Roads. This latter feature proved ideal for the naval delegations which came from points all around the world.

The Jamestown Exposition of 1907 was one of the many world's fairs and expositions that were popular in the early part of the 20th century. Held from April 26, 1907, to December 1, 1907, attendees included US President Theodore Roosevelt, Kaiser Wilhelm II of Germany, the Prince of Sweden, Mark Twain, Henry H. Rogers, and dozens of other dignitaries and famous persons. A major naval review featuring the United States' Great White Fleet was a key feature. U.S. Military officials and leaders were impressed by the location, and the Exposition site later formed the first portion of the large U.S. Naval Station Norfolk in 1918 during World War I.

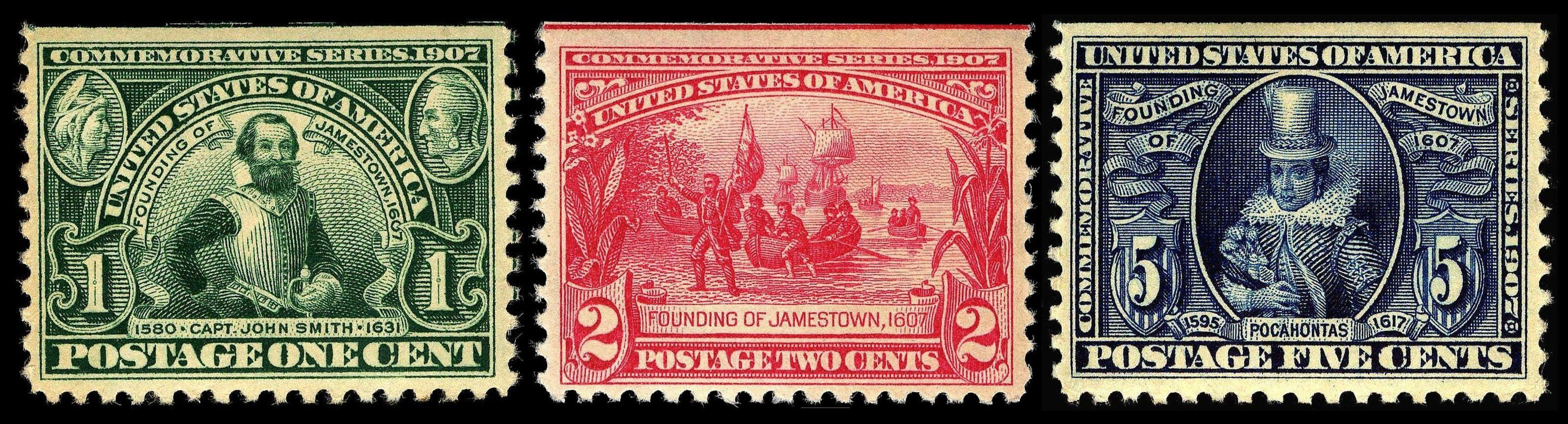
Jamestown commemorative stamps, issue of 1907 The U.S. Post Office issued a set of stamps, on the 300th anniversary of the founding of the Jamestown colony.

=== 350th anniversary (1957): Jamestown Festival ===
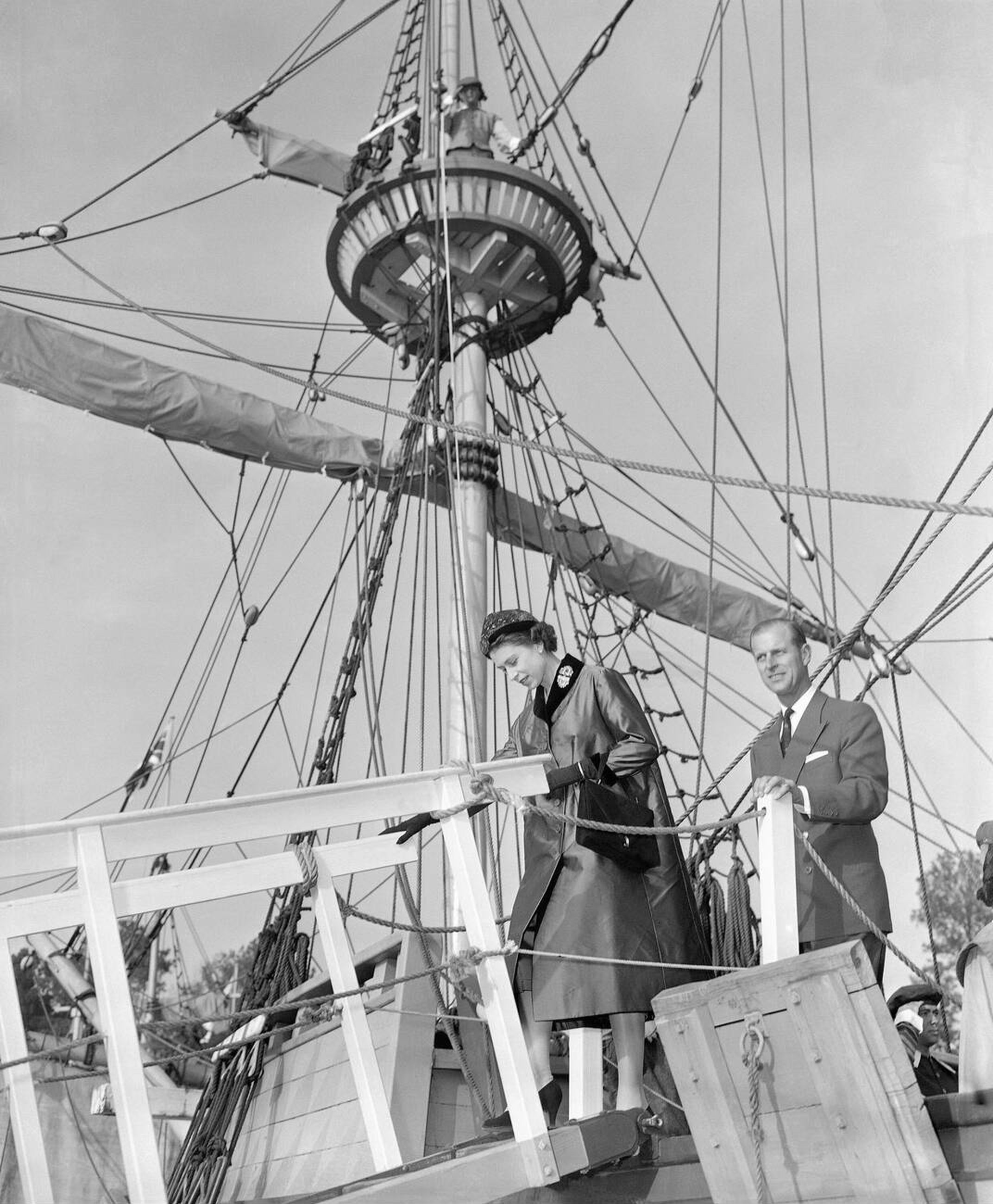
Queen Elizabeth II of the United Kingdom and her consort Prince Philip inspect the replica of Susan Constant at Jamestown Festival Park on October 16, 1957

With America's increased access to automobiles, and with improved roads and transportation, it was feasible for the 350th anniversary celebration to be held at Jamestown itself in 1957. Although erosion had cut off the land bridge between Jamestown Island and the mainland, the isthmus was restored and new access provided by the completion of the National Park Service's Colonial Parkway which led to Williamsburg and Yorktown, the other two portions of Colonial Virginia's Historic Triangle. There were also improvements of state highways. The north landing for the popular Jamestown Ferry and a portion of State Route 31 were relocated.

Major projects were developed by non-profit, state and federal agencies. Jamestown Festival Park was established by the Commonwealth of Virginia adjacent to the entrance to Jamestown Island. Full-sized replicas of the three ships that brought the colonists, Susan Constant, Godspeed, and Discovery were constructed at a shipyard in Portsmouth, Virginia and placed on display at a new dock at Jamestown, where the largest, Susan Constant, could be boarded by visitors. On Jamestown Island, the reconstructed Jamestown Glasshouse, the Memorial Cross and the visitors center were completed and dedicated. A loop road was built around the island.

Special events included army and navy reviews, air force fly-overs, ship and aircraft christenings and even an outdoor drama at Cape Henry, site of the first landing of the settlers. This celebration continued from April 1 to November 30 with over a million participants, including dignitaries and politicians such as the British ambassador and U.S. vice president Richard Nixon. The highlight for many of the nearly 25,000 at the Festival Park on October 16, 1957, was the visit and speech of Queen Elizabeth II of the United Kingdom and her consort, Prince Philip. Queen Elizabeth II loaned a copy of Magna Carta for the exhibition. It was her first visit to the United States since ascending the throne.

The 1957 Jamestown Festival was so successful that tourists still kept coming long after the official event was completed. Jamestown became a permanent attraction of the Historic Triangle, and has been visited by families, school groups, tours, and thousands of other people continuously ever since.

=== 400th anniversary: Jamestown 2007 ===
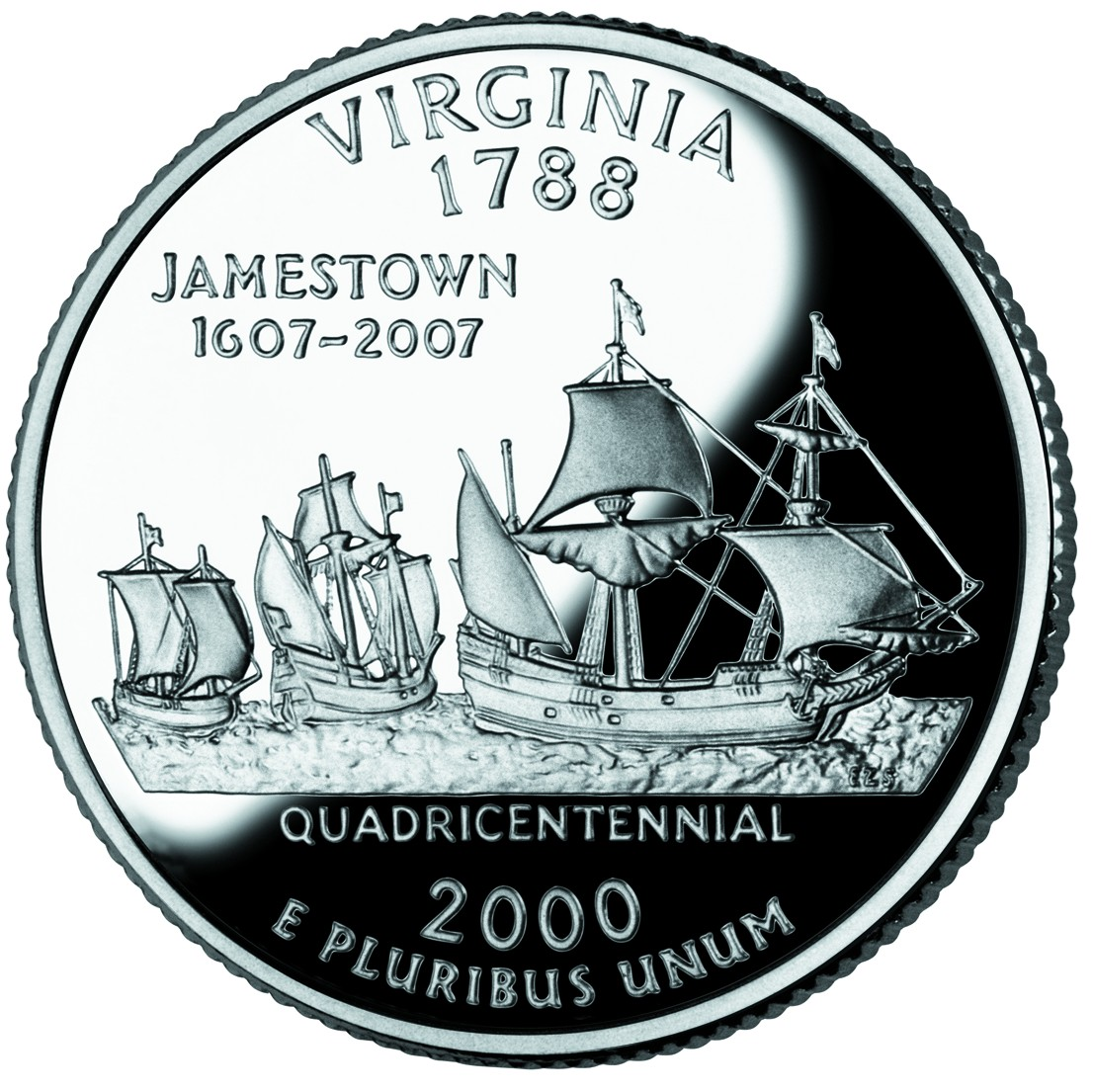
Virginia State Quarter (Reverse)

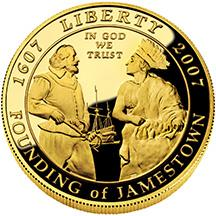
Obverse of the Jamestown 400th Anniversary gold five dollar coin

Coins released in commemoration of the 400th anniversary

Early in the 21st century, new accommodations, transportation facilities and attractions were planned in preparation for the quadricentennial of the founding of Jamestown. Numerous events were promoted under the banner of America's 400th Anniversary and promoted by the Jamestown 2007 Commission. The commemoration included 18 months of statewide, national and international festivities and events, which began in April 2006 with a tour of the new replica Godspeed.

In January 2007, the Virginia General Assembly held a session at Jamestown. On May 4, 2007, Queen Elizabeth II of the United Kingdom and Prince Philip attended a ceremony commemorating the 400th anniversary of the settlement's arrivals, reprising the honor they paid in 1957.

In addition to the Virginia State Quarter, Jamestown was also the subject of two United States commemorative coins celebrating the 400th anniversary of its settlement. A silver dollar and a gold five dollar coin were issued in 2007.

=== 2019 commemoration ===
In 2019 Jamestown, in cooperation with Williamsburg, held a commemoration that marked the 400th anniversary of three landmark events in American history: the first meeting of the General Assembly, the arrival of the first Africans to English North America, and the first Thanksgiving.

== In popular culture ==
- A fictional romantic adventure set at Jamestown, To Have and to Hold, was the bestselling novel in the United States in 1900. The novel was later adapted into two feature films, in 1916 and 1922.
- A highly fictionalized version of the Jamestown settlement is depicted in the animated Disney film Pocahontas (1995) as well as its direct-to-video sequel Pocahontas II: Journey to a New World (1998). Among other inaccuracies it is shown as being near mountains, when it was actually located on the Tidewater region.
- A feature-length film, The New World (2005), directed by Terrence Malick, covers the story of Jamestown's colonization. Although the historical details are accurate in most ways, the plot focuses on a dramatized relationship between John Smith, played by Colin Farrell, and Pocahontas, played by Q'orianka Kilcher. It also features John Rolfe, played by Christian Bale. Many scenes were filmed on-location along the James and Chickahominy Rivers and at Henricus Historical Park in Chesterfield County, Virginia.
- Another feature-length film, First Landing: The Voyage from England to Jamestown (2007), documents the 1607 landing of English colonists.
- In 2017, Sky 1 launched a new series based in Jamestown. The series, named after its eponymous setting, revolves around the societal change triggered by the arrival of women to the settlement to marry the male citizens of the area, and is made by the producers of Downton Abbey.
- The story of Bartholomew Gosnold and the establishment of Jamestown is told in the 2018 musical To Look For America written by Richard Digance and Eric Sedge.
- In the For All Mankind TV series, a fictional lunar base of the United States, erected in the lunar south pole region, is named after Jamestown.
