= Richard Alan Masters =

Artist

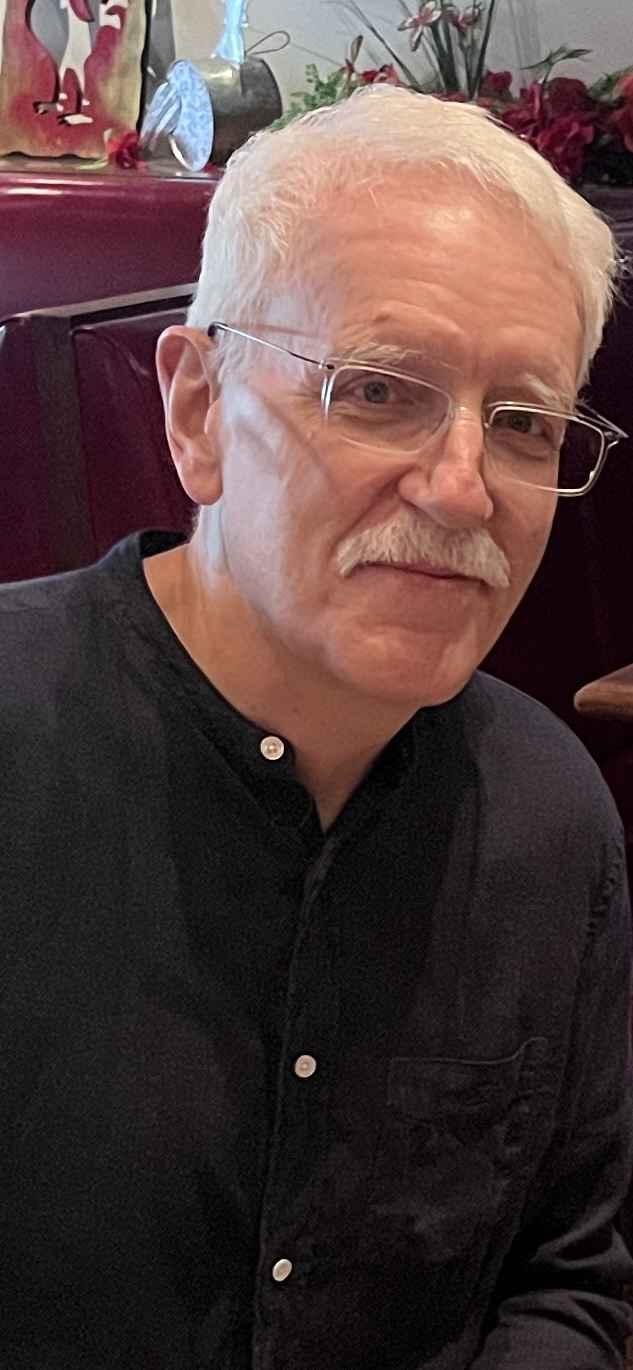
- Born: August 5, 1955 (age 71); Sioux City, Iowa
- Education: University of Iowa
- Occupation: Artist

Richard Alan Masters (born August 5, 1955) is a graphic designer, studio artist, and coin designer.

== Academic career ==
Masters graduated from the University of Iowa art school where he received a BA, MA, and MFA. He subsequently moved to Wisconsin where he worked as a freelance illustrator and as a professor of graphic design at the University of Wisconsin Oshkosh where he was selected for the SNC Professor of International Relations Endowed Professorship Award.

== Studio art career ==
Masters works most often in graphite or colored pencil, though he has worked in other media. His work is often described as painstakingly detailed, with subject matter ranging from nature scenes and architectural representations to the somber aspects of city life and homelessness. His works have been shown at invited and juried exhibitions throughout the world, and have won numerous awards, including the Allied Artists of American top award, the Audrey Love Memorial Award in 2021.

== Coin designs ==
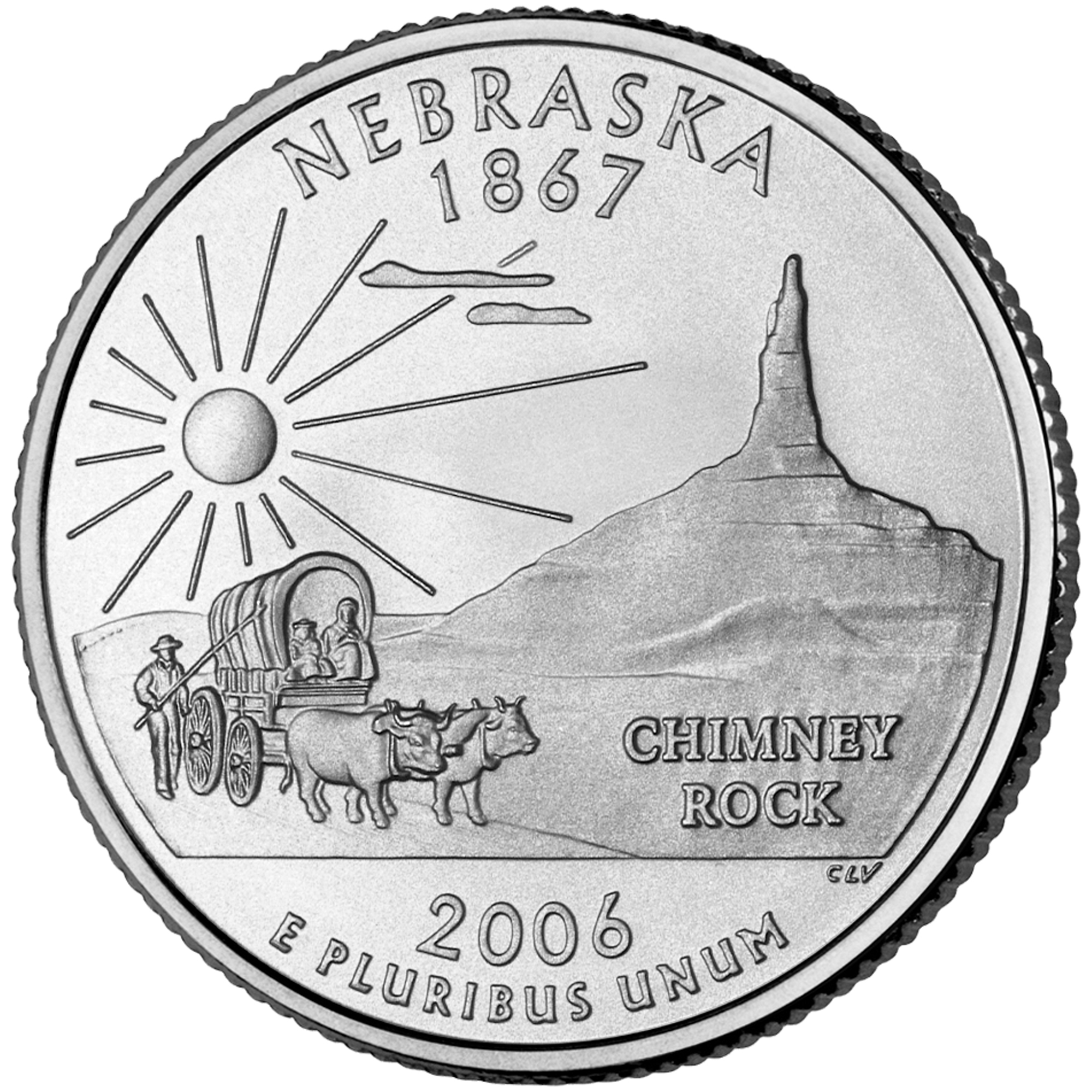
State Quarters Program Nebraska reverse, designed by Richard Masters

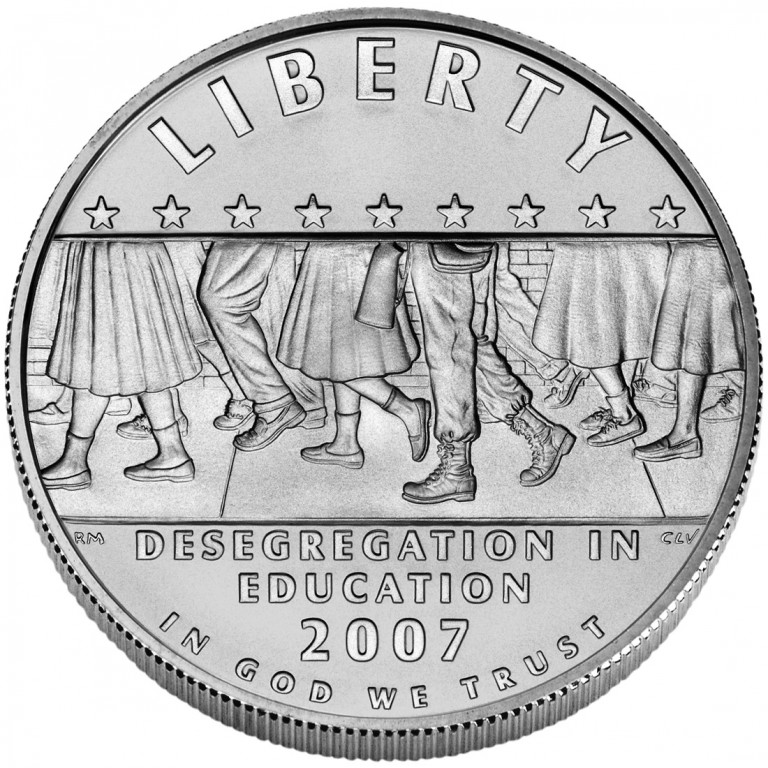
Little Rock Central High School Desegregation coin, designed by Richard Masters, winner of Coin of the Year

In 2004, Masters became an inaugural member of the United States Mint's Artistic Infusion Program as a Master Designer. This program brought artists with expertise in visual arts to enrich and elevate the design of coins for the US Mint. He applied to the program as a lifelong coin collector. A prolific designer, his designs were selected for over 30 coins and medals. As of 2024, he is still an active member of the program, and the only remaining original member.

His first design was the reverse of the Nebraska quarter for the State Quarters Program in 2006. His designs went on to garner awards such as the Coin of the Year award for best contemporary event in 2009 for his Little Rock Central High School Desegregation silver dollar design, an accomplishment repeated with the 2021 American Liberty High Relief Gold Coin, winning the award for best gold coin.

One of his designs, featuring a Samoa flying fox, a species of fruit bat, representing the National Park of American Samoa, was central to conspiracy theories that the United States government was involved in the dissemination of the SARS-CoV-2 virus that caused the COVID-19 pandemic. This theory was thoroughly debunked, but gave the coin design some short-lived infamy.

Minted designs
Year	Design	Category	Notes
2006	State Quarters Program - Nebraska reverse	coin	
2007	Little Rock Central High School Desegregation silver dollar - obverse	coin	Winner of Coin of the Year Award
2009	Lincoln Bicentennial One Cent Coin Program (Birth and Early Childhood in Kentucky) - reverse	coin	
2009	District of Columbia and U.S. Territories Quarters Program - Northern Mariana Islands reverse	coin	
2011	Native American $1 Coin Program - reverse	coin	
2011	First Spouse Gold Coin and Medal Program - Julia Grant reverse	coin and medal	
2011	United States Army Commemorative Coin Program – Silver obverse	coin	
2011	Medal of Honor Commemorative Coin Program – Silver reverse	coin	
2012	Star-Spangled Banner Commemorative Coin Program – Gold revers	coin	
2013	5-Star Generals Commemorative Coin Program – Silver obverse	coin	
2013	First Spouse Gold Coin and Medal Program – Helen Taft reverse	coin and medal	
2008	Code Talkers Recognition Congressional Medals Program – Comanche Nation obverse	medal	
2010	Professor Muhammad Yunus Congressional Gold Medal – reverse	medal	
2014	First Spouse Gold Coin and Medal Program – Lou Hoover reverse	coin and medal	
2015	U.S. Marshals Service 225th Anniversary Commemorative Coin Program – Silver obverse	coin	
2015	First Spouse Gold Coin and Medal Program – Mamie Eisenhower obverse	coin and medal	
2015	First Special Service Force Congressional Gold Medal	medal	
2016	Presidential $1 Coins – Ronald Reagan obverse	coin	
2016	First Spouse Gold Coin and Medal Program – Patricia Ryan “Pat” Nixon obverse and reverse	coin and medal	
2017	America the Beautiful Quarters Program – Effigy Mounds National Monument reverse	coin	
2018	America the Beautiful Quarters Program – Apostle Islands National Lakeshore reverse	coin	
2019	American Innovation $1 Coin Program – Pennsylvania reverse	coin	
2019	American Legion Commemorative Coin Program – Clad obverse and reverse	coin	
2019	American Liberty High Relief Gold Coin and Silver Medal – obverse	coin and medal	
	American Veterans Silver Medal – reverse	medal	
2020	America the Beautiful Quarters Program – National Park of American Samoa reverse	coin	
2020	America the Beautiful Quarters Program – Salt River Bay National Historical Park and Ecological Preserve reverse	coin	
2020	American Innovation $1 Coin Program – Connecticut reverse	coin	
2021	American Liberty High Relief Gold Coin and Silver Medal – reverse	coin and medal	Winner of Coin of the Year Award
2021	U.S. Armed Forces Silver Medals Program – Coast Guard obverse	medal	
2019	Katherine Johnson Hidden Figures Bronze Medal - reverse	medal	
2019	Dorothy Vaughan Hidden Figures Bronze Medal - reverse	medal	
2020	Merrill’s Marauders Congressional Gold Medal – reverse	medal	
	Presidential Medal Program – George W. Bush (Term 2) reverse	medal	
	Presidential Medal Program – Barack Obama (Term 1) obverse	medal	

== Personal life ==
Masters retired from teaching in 2015, and now lives in New York City with his wife, MeeWha Alana Lee. He continues to pursue studio art and exhibits his work broadly, garnering many honors for his works.
