= Jamestown 400th Anniversary silver dollar =

2007 United States commemorative coin

Jamestown 400th Anniversary dollar
- United States
- Value: 1 U.S. Dollar
- Mass: 26.73 g
- Diameter: 38.1 mm
- Thickness: 2.58 mm
- Edge: Reeded
- Composition: 90% Ag / 10% Cu
- Years of minting: 2007
- Mintage: 79,801 Uncirculated 258,802 Proof
- Mint marks: P

Obverse
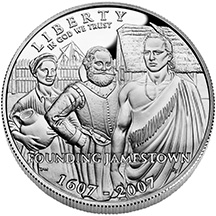
- Design: The "Three Faces of Diversity" of Jamestown including an African, Captain John Smith and an American Indian. Inscriptions: "Liberty", "In God We Trust", "Founding Jamestown" "1607 - 2007"
- Designer: Donna Weaver
- Design date: 2007

Reverse
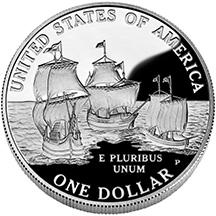
- Design: Depiction of the three ships Susan Constant, Godspeed, and the Discovery which brought the first settlers to Jamestown. Inscriptions: "United States of America", "One Dollar", "E Pluribus Unum" and mint mark 'P'
- Designer: Susan Gamble
- Design date: 2007

The Jamestown 400th Anniversary silver dollar is a commemorative coin issued by the United States Mint in 2007. The coin commemorates the 400th anniversary of the founding of Jamestown, the first permanent English settlement in North America. The coin was released alongside the Jamestown 400th Anniversary half eagle.

== Legislation ==
The Jamestown 400th Anniversary Commemorative Coin Act of 2004 (Pub. L. 108–289 (text) (PDF)) was introduced into the House of Representatives on May 1, 2003, by Representative Jo Ann Davis of Virginia. The bill was approved by the House the following year on July 14, 2004, and by the Senate on July 20. The bill was signed into law by President George W. Bush on August 6, 2004. The law authorized the minting of both a silver dollar and a gold half eagle commemorating the founding of Jamestown.

== Designs ==
The obverse of the coin features an African woman, John Smith and an American Indian man, intended to represent the diversity of the colony's inhabitants. Jamestown is represented by a stockade and building in the background. The obverse was designed by Donna Weaver and sculpted by Don Everhart. The reverse of the coin depicts the Susan Constant, the Godspeed, and the Discovery, the three ships that brought the colonists to Jamestown. The same ships were depicted on the Virginia state quarter issued in 2000, which also celebrated the quadricentennial founding of Jamestown. The reverse was designed by Susan Gamble through the recent Artistic Infusion Program and sculpted by Charles L. Vickers. The Citizens Coinage Advisory Committee approved the designs on January 24, 2006, although some objections were made about using the phrase "Founding Jamestown" on the obverse. The Commission of Fine Arts recommended the designs to Acting Director of the Mint David Lebryk on February 16, suggesting a change in the depiction of the water on the reverse. The designs were unveiled to the public by the Mint on August 16, 2006, in a ceremony hosted by Jamestown 2007.

== Production and distribution ==
The coin was sold as both as an uncirculated coin and a proof coin, with a maximum coinage allowed of 500,000 coins. Some proof coins were sold as part of the 2007 America Legacy Set, which included a proof set of all 14 circulating coins of 2007 and the Little Rock Central High School Desegregation silver dollar. Of the 258,802 proof coins minted, 26,442 were sold as part of the Legacy set. The Mint states that 79,801 uncirculated coins were minted, with a total mintage of 338,603.

The Mint began accepting orders on January 10, 2007, charging a pre-issue price of $33 for the uncirculated coin and $35 for the proof coin. After February 12 the prices hiked to $35 for the uncirculated coin and $39 for the proof coin. The Mint reported strong sales for the coin. A $10 surcharge from each sale of the coin was donated to Jamestown-Yorktown Foundation of the Commonwealth of Virginia, the Secretary of the Interior, and the Association for the Preservation of Virginia Antiquities to support programs that promote the understanding of the legacies of Jamestown.

== Collecting ==
As with many modern US commemorative coins there has been a lack of numismatic interest in the coin in the years after its release.

== See also ==
- United States commemorative coins
- List of United States commemorative coins and medals (2000s)
- Jamestown 400th Anniversary half eagle
