= Jamestown 2007 =

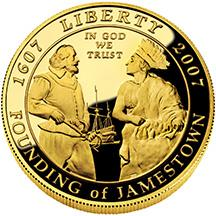
Obverse of the Jamestown 400th Anniversary gold five dollar coin

Jamestown 2007 is the name of the organization which planned the events commemorating the 400th anniversary (quadricentennial) of the founding of Jamestown, Virginia in 1607, the first permanent English-speaking settlement in what is now the United States of America. America's 400th Anniversary was an 18-month-long commemoration including 10 Signature Events, hundreds of community programs and dozens of partner and programs and events. Activities took place throughout Virginia, in major cities along the East Coast, and in the United Kingdom.

The 400th anniversary commemoration helped redefine Jamestown's role in American history. Long regarded by many Americans as a failed settlement or a historical footnote, Jamestown's contributions were brought into sharper focus. Jamestown's legacies of democracy, free enterprise and cultural diversity linked the nation's earliest days to contemporary American life. Claims to these legacies were supported by new archeological discoveries by William Kelso at Historic Jamestowne and new scholarly research by respected historians such as James Horn of the Colonial Williamsburg Foundation.

One of the commemoration's greatest achievements was active participation by the three Jamestown cultures - the European-American colonists, African Americans and Virginia Native Americans. While major Jamestown observances have been held every 50 years since 1807, America's 400th Anniversary marked the first time representatives of all three cultures developed their own events and messages.

== UK events ==
The Discovery, one of Jamestown Settlement's re-created ships, was replaced in early 2007 with a more historically accurate version. The older ship was then transported to the London Docklands, where she has been moored outside the Museum in Docklands in conjunction with the "Journey to the New World: London 1606 to Virginia 1607" temporary exhibition. This exhibition focussed on connections between London and the Virginia settlement, and ran from 23 November 2006 to 13 May 2007.Museum in Docklands - Journey to the New World Another major special exhibition in the UK for the anniversary has been "A New World: England’s first view of America", running from 15 March to 17 June 2007 at the British Museum and focussing on the drawings of John White. British Museum - Archive: A New World

== US celebrations ==
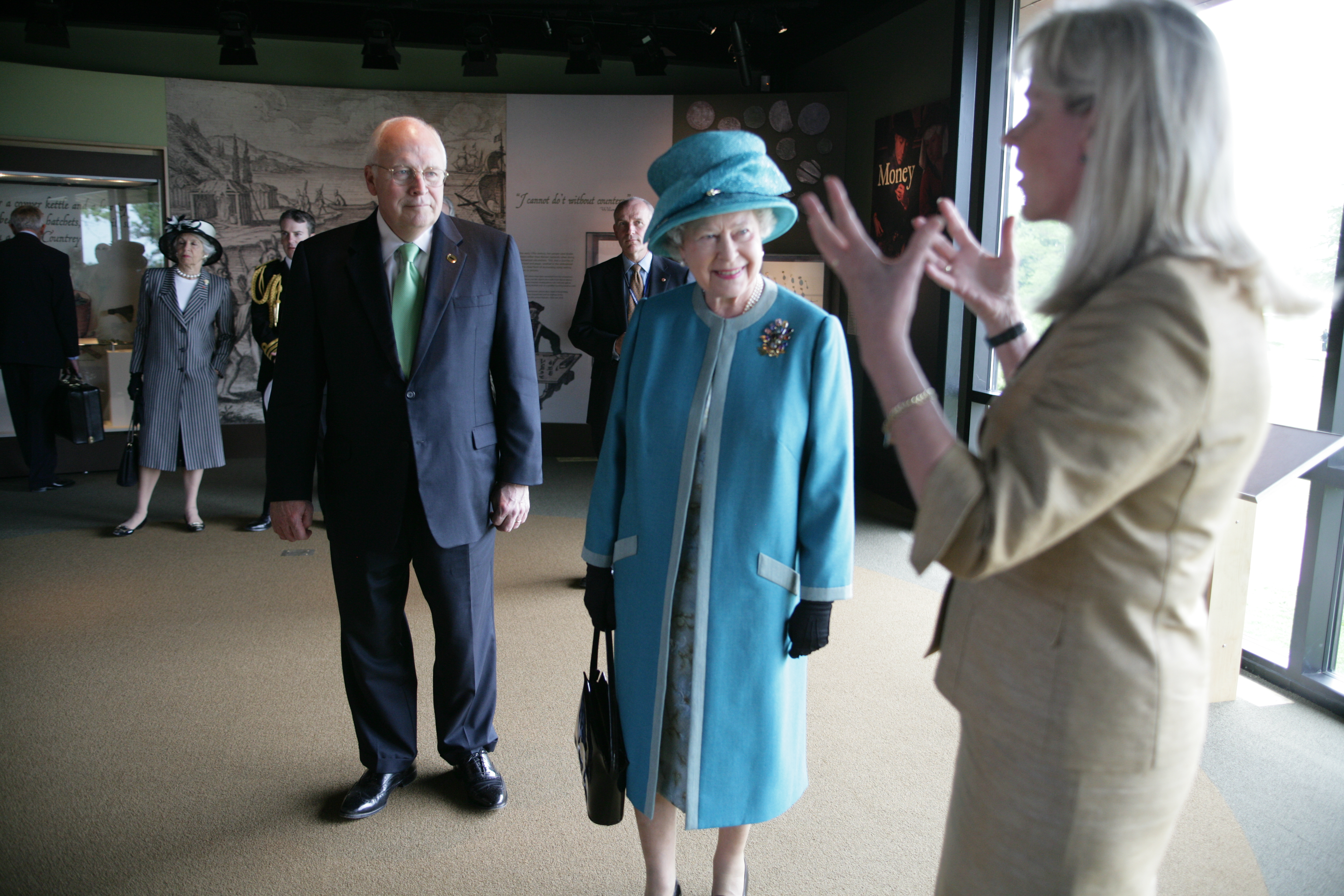
Foreground left to right: Vice President Dick Cheney and Queen Elizabeth II are given a tour of the Jamestown Archaearium by curator Beverly Straube in 2007

In February 2006, it was announced that retired Supreme Court Associate Justice Sandra Day O'Connor would become the honorary chair of America's 400th Anniversary. (In October 2005, she had accepted the ceremonial role of becoming the 23rd chancellor of the College of William and Mary, which was founded in nearby Williamsburg in 1693.) The Commonwealth of Virginia made a major commitment to Jamestown 2007 and enlisted the Colonial Williamsburg Foundation as well as large corporate sponsors such as Verizon Communications and the Norfolk Southern Corp. (which itself has a rich Virginia history, being involved in early railroads; the Norfolk Southern Railway's predecessor railroads, including the Norfolk and Western Railway and the Virginian Railway, provided major transportation services for attendees at the 1907 Jamestown Exposition).

The commemoration was launched in May 2007 with the 2006 Godspeed Sail, a visit of the replica ship to Alexandria, VA, Baltimore, Philadelphia, New York City, Boston and Newport, RI. Other major events included Tavis Smiley's 2007 State of the Black Union, the American Indian Intertribal Festival and Jamestown Live!, a webcast reaching more than a million students. The centerpiece of the commemoration was America's Anniversary Weekend, a three-day festival and observance held on the weekend of Jamestown's 400th anniversary (May 11–13, 2007). Among other festivities, the Weekend featured performances from high school choirs throughout the country from Newton, Massachusetts to Alabama, coming together in a 1607-member chorus with a 400-member orchestra.

In January 2007, the Virginia General Assembly held a session at Jamestown, where a speech was given by then U.S. Vice-President Dick Cheney, and Virginia's Governor at the time Tim Kaine delivered the "State of the Commonwealth" speech. Queen Elizabeth II of the United Kingdom and Prince Philip attended the main ceremonies in May 2007.

Participating dignitaries included Queen Elizabeth II, President George W. Bush, retired Supreme Court Justice Sandra Day O'Connor, actor James Earl Jones, journalists such as Jim Lehrer, Gwen Ifill and Tavis Smiley, and musicians Bruce Hornsby, Ricky Skaggs and Chaka Khan. The commemoration's major partners included Colonial Williamsburg, NASA, the U.S. Mint, the U.S. Postal Service, the Virginia Arts Festival and Virginia Tech. Jamestown Partners included the National Park Service, the Association for the Preservation of Virginia Antiquities, and the Jamestown-Yorktown Foundation.

Some members of Virginia Indian tribes did not attend the festivities, out of concern over what they perceive the settlement to represent for their people.

=== Royal visit ===
In November 2006, Queen Elizabeth II of the United Kingdom announced that she and her husband, Prince Philip, Duke of Edinburgh, would make a state visit to the U.S. in May 2007, her first since 1991. She arrived in Virginia on May 3, 2007, having previously visited Jamestown in 1957 for the 350th anniversary. Elizabeth II was not only a direct descendant of James I of England, the settlement's namesake, but also the direct descendant of George III of the United Kingdom, under whose reign Great Britain lost the same territory in the American War of Independence.

== Commemorative objects ==
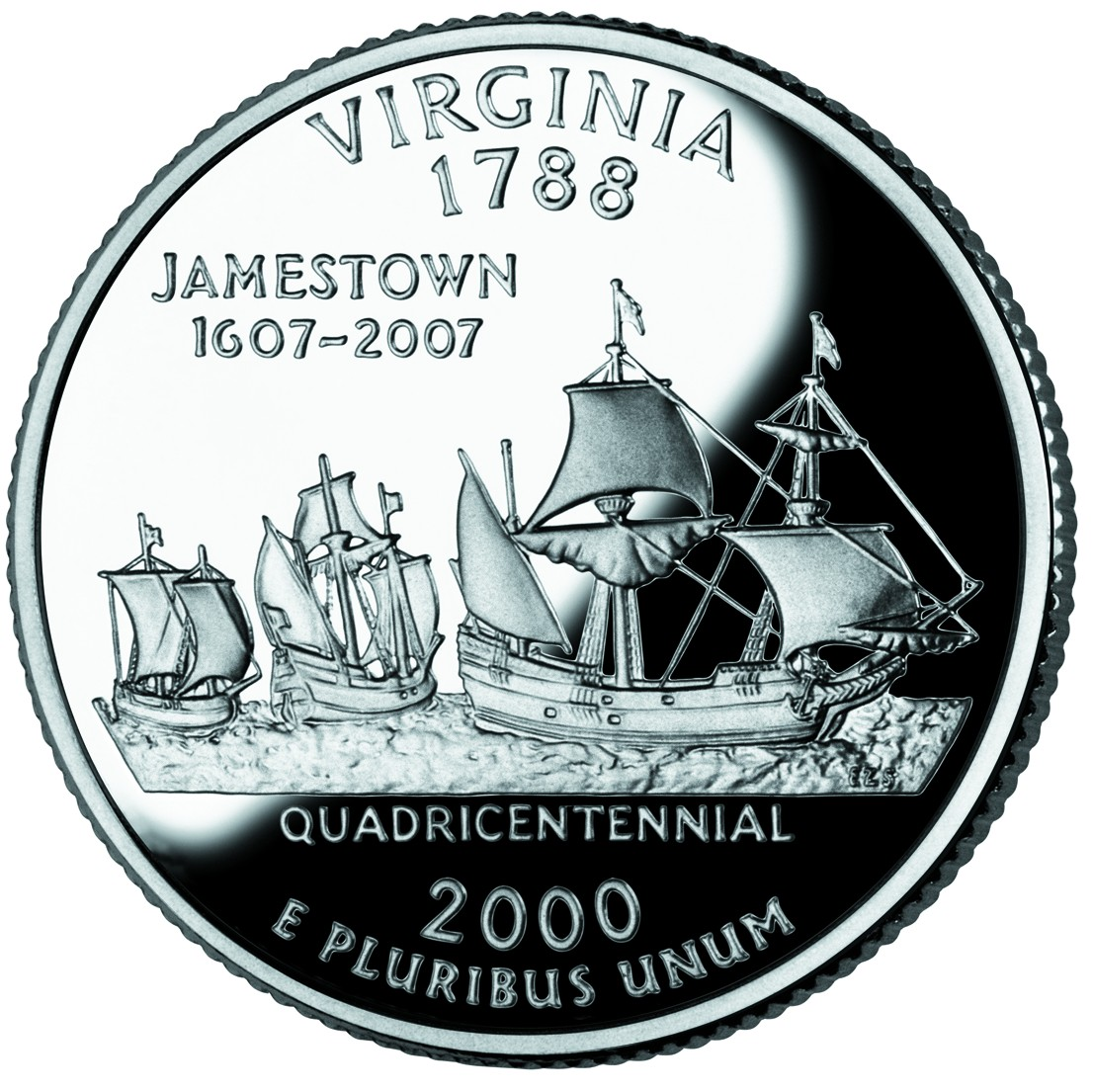
Virginia State Quarter (Reverse)

Coins released in commemoration of the 400th anniversary

Jamestown is also the subject of three United States commemorative coins celebrating the 400th anniversary of its settlement. In 2000, the state quarter for Virginia was release whose design commemorated the then future celebration. A silver dollar and a gold five dollar coin were issued in 2007. Surcharges from the sale of the coin were donated to Jamestown-Yorktown Foundation of the Commonwealth of Virginia, the Secretary of the Interior, and Preservation Virginia to support programs that promote the understanding of the legacies of Jamestown.

== See also ==
- Historic Jamestown (current attraction)
- Jamestown Settlement (current attraction)
- Jamestown Rediscovery (current archaeological project)
- Jamestown Festival Park (1957 and later)
- Jamestown Exposition (1907)
- James City County
- Colonial Parkway
- Historic Triangle
- U.S. Open Cycling Championships
