= Jamestown 400th Anniversary half eagle =

American coin

Dollar
- United States
- Value: 5 U.S. Dollar
- Mass: 8.359 g
- Diameter: .850 Inches mm
- Thickness: 1.65 mm mm
- Edge: Reeded
- Composition: 90% Gold/10% Alloy
- Years of minting: 2007
- Catalog number: ?

Obverse
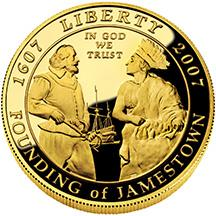
- Design: Capt. John Smith greeting an American Indian carrying a bag of corn. Inscriptions: '1607-2007', 'Liberty', 'In God We Trust' & 'Founding of Jamestown'
- Designer: John Mercanti
- Design date: 2007

Reverse
- Design: A rendering of Jamestown Memorial Church Inscriptions: 'United States of America', '$5', 'E Pluribus Unum', 'Jamestown Memorial Church' & mint mark 'W'
- Designer: Susan Gamble
- Design date: 2007

In 2007, the United States Mint released a gold five-dollar commemorative coin which commemorates the 400th year after the founding of Jamestown. Surcharges from the sale of the Jamestown commemorative were donated to Jamestown-Yorktown Foundation of the Commonwealth of Virginia, the Secretary of the Interior and the Association for the Preservation of Virginia Antiquities to support programs that promote the understanding of the legacies of Jamestown.

The coin was sold as both as a proof coin and an uncirculated coin, with a maximum coinage of 100,000 coins.

== Features ==
Coin Finishes: proof, and uncirculated

Maximum Mintage: 100,000 - The final mintages were 18,348 uncirculated, and 46,365 proof.

U.S. Mint Facility: West Point Mint (W)

Public Law: 108-289

== See also ==
- United States commemorative coins
- List of United States commemorative coins and medals (2000s)
- Jamestown 400th Anniversary silver dollar
