= Historic Jamestown =

Cultural heritage site in Virginia, United States

Jamestown National Historic Site
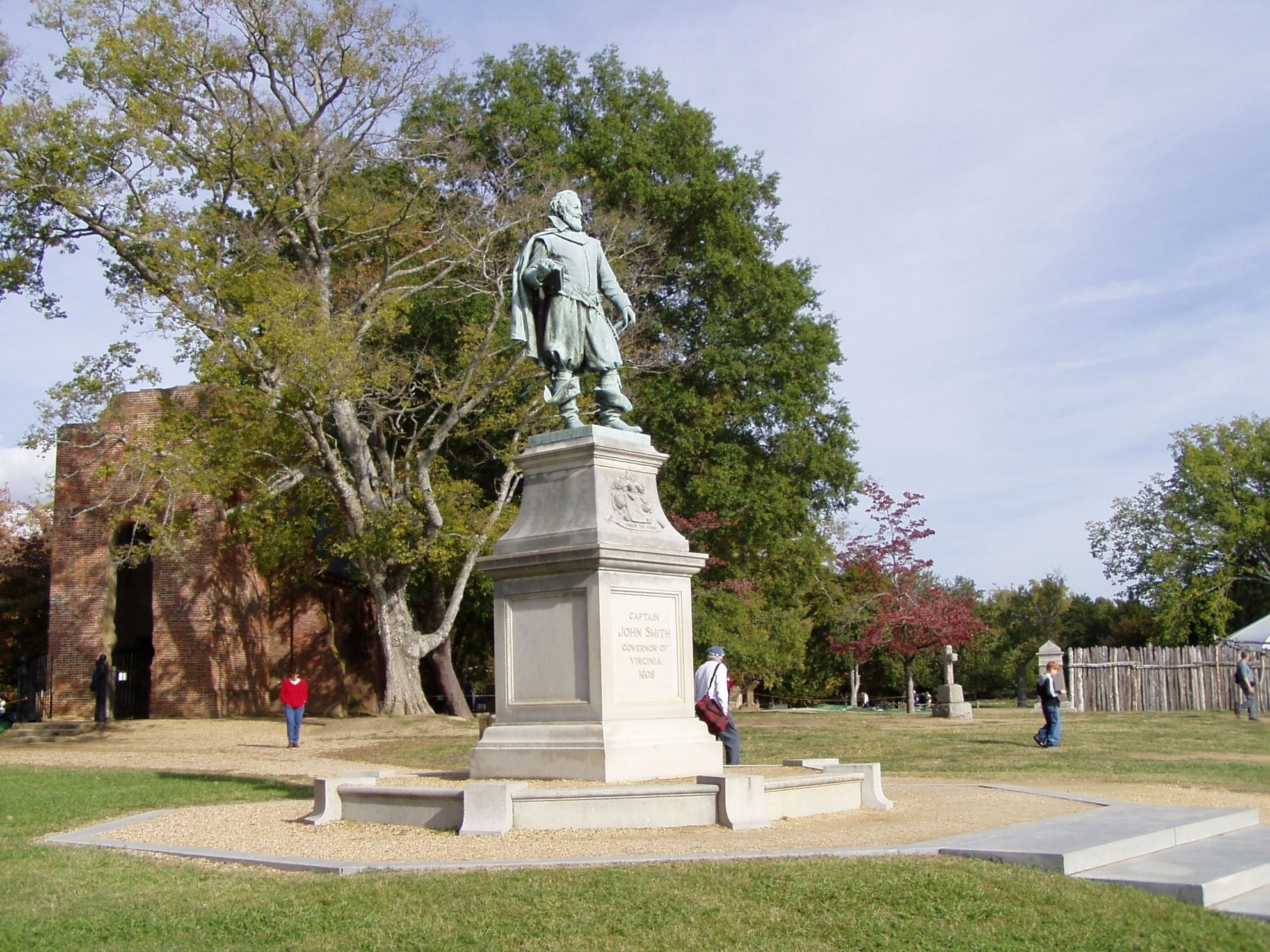
- A statue of John Smith, English explorer and most famous of the colony's early governors

- Location within Virginia Location within the United States
- Location: 1368 Colonial Parkway, Jamestown, Virginia, United States
- Nearest city: Williamsburg, Virginia
- Coordinates: 37°12′35″N 76°46′44″W
- Area: 20.63 acres (8.35 ha)
- Established: December 18, 1940
- Governing body: Preservation Virginia (in partnership with NPS)
- Website: Historic Jamestowne
- Jamestown National Historic Site
- U.S. National Register of Historic Places
- U.S. Historic district
- Virginia Landmarks Register
- Location: James City, Colony of Virginia
- Built: May 14, 1607
- NRHP reference No.: 66000840
- VLR No.: 047-0009

Significant dates
- Added to NRHP: October 15, 1966
- Designated VLR: October 18, 1983

Historic Jamestowne is the cultural heritage site that was the location of the 1607 James Fort and the later 17th-century town of Jamestown in America. It is located on Jamestown Island, on the James River at Jamestown, Virginia, and operated as a partnership between Preservation Virginia (formerly known as the Association for the Preservation of Virginia Antiquities) and the U.S. National Park Service as part of Colonial National Historical Park.

The site was designated Jamestown National Historic Site on December 18, 1940, and listed on the National Register of Historic Places on October 15, 1966. It was also designated a National Historic Chemical Landmark in 2007 by the American Chemical Society. It is adjacent and complementary with Jamestown Settlement, a living history museum built run by the Commonwealth of Virginia to interpret the early colony.

== History ==
Jamestown, first established in the Virginia Colony at Jamestown, on May 13, 1607, was the site of the first permanent English settlement in North America. Upon arrival, the hundred-some colonists set about constructing a fort to protect themselves from the nearby Virginia Indian tribes and from a potential attack from the Spanish settlements in Florida.

Between 1609 and 1611, lack of local food and replenishment of supplies from England, and inability to cope with disease led to the "starving time", which only 60 colonists survived. The colony was resupplied with new colonists, and over the next several decades became the center of government for the English colonists. The port received additional arrivals from England to the new land, with about 500 people living in or around it at its peak.

Jamestown was the capital of the Virginia Colony. During Bacon's Rebellion in 1676, much of Jamestown was burned down, but the town was rebuilt. After an accidental second burning in 1698, the capital was relocated to higher ground at Middle Plantation in 1699. This was renamed as Williamsburg. After being superseded, Jamestown rapidly declined as a settlement. By the 1750s, the land was owned and extensively cultivated primarily by the Travis and Ambler families.

Due to its location on the James River, the island saw some action during the American Revolutionary War (1776–1781). The area was used as a military post where American and British prisoners of war were exchanged.

In the 19th century, Jamestown Island reverted to little-used farmland. In 1862 it was developed as the site of Doller's Point Battery, a Confederate earthworks during the American Civil War intended to protect Richmond against Union gunboats. Swann's Point Battery was a Union Army battery located at Swann's Point, above the mouth of Gray's Creek on the James River, opposite Jamestown Island, from 1862 to 1865. The Ambler Farm was burned by escaped slaves, who found the desolate island to be a haven. The area reverted to farmland until preservation efforts began at the end of the 19th century.

== Mission ==
According to their website, Jamestown Rediscovery is "committed to supporting preservation, education, and the archaeological investigation of Historic Jamestowne, the original site of the first permanent English settlement in America."

== Preservation ==
Late in the 19th century, Jamestown became the focus of new historical interest, and by 1893, the site of Jamestown was owned by Mr and Mrs Edward Barney, who donated 22.5 acres (9.1 ha) of land on Jamestown Island, including the 17th-century tower of the Jamestown Church, to Preservation Virginia historic preservation. By this time, erosion from the river had eaten away the island's western shore; visitors began to conclude that the site of James Fort lay completely underwater. With federal assistance, a sea wall was constructed in 1900 to stabilize and protect the area from further erosion. In 1907, with the site's 300th anniversary in mind, the present Jamestown Church was rebuilt by the National Society of the Colonial Dames of America, re-using the surviving 17th-century tower.

In 1932, George C. Gregory discovered the foundation of the first capitol building, circa 1646, at Jamestown. In 1934, Colonial National Historical Park obtained the remaining 1,500-acre (610 ha) of the island and partnered with Preservation Virginia to preserve the area and present it to visitors in an educational manner. The site was designated Jamestown National Historic Site on December 18, 1940, and listed on the National Register of Historic Places on October 15, 1966. The National Park Service maintains the remaining portions of the island with recreations of building foundations of the post-1610 Jamestown port town. In 1957, with the site's 350th anniversary in mind, New Discoveries at Jamestown was published.

In 1994, with the quadricentennial year approaching, Preservation Virginia agreed to fund a 10-year archaeological project called Jamestown Rediscovery to search for any remains of James Fort, led by William Kelso. By 1996, they had found James Fort, which had only lost a western bulwark to river erosion.

In 2006, many preparations were underway for the Jamestown 2007 event celebrating the 400th anniversary of the settlement. The site was visited by several dignitaries, including President George W. Bush and Dick Cheney. Queen Elizabeth II visited to commemorate the 400th anniversary of the landing on May 4, 2007 – she had previously visited the park in October 1957. As noted by Queen Elizabeth during her state visit to the U.S. in 2007, Jamestowne was the beginning, not just of America, but of the British Empire.

== Significant structures ==
The Historic Jamestowne area of Jamestown Island includes several important structures, both historical and modern.

=== Old Town ===
This area includes the ruins within the original 1607 James Fort, the restored Jamestown Church, and the ruins of the Statehouse.

=== New Town ===
Situated to the east of the Old Towne area, this area includes the Ambler Mansion ruins, the rowhouse, and Governor Harvey House.

=== Monuments ===
The tall Tercentenary Monument, which resembles the Washington Monument in Washington, was placed on Jamestown Island by the United States government in 1907 for the 300th anniversary of the settlement. It cost $50,000 at the time, stands 103 feet (31 meters) tall, and is made of New Hampshire granite. The north face inscription reads: Jamestown - The first permanent colony of the English people. The birthplace of Virginia and of the United States - May 13, 1607.

The General Assembly Monument was unveiled on July 31, 1907, as a gift of the Norfolk branch of the APVA. Located near the church, it is a small obelisk designed to commemorate the first meeting of Virginia's General Assembly in July 1619.

A horse trough, a gift from the Society of Colonial Wars in 1907, was installed in a place now just outside the Yeardley House offices of the Jamestown Rediscovery project. It was designed by architect Harold Van Buren Magonigle.

The APVA Gates, a brick and iron entrance to the land owned by the APVA, was presented on May 9, 1909, by The Colonial Dames of America. They were relocated to its present location northeast of the Memorial Church in 1957.

The bronze John Smith statue was unveiled on May 13, 1909, and was a gift from Joseph Bryan and his wife, Isobel, early supporters of the APVA. William Couper, from Norfolk, designed the statue. It has a granite base, and measures 20 feet tall. The inscription on the base reads: John Smith, Governor of Virginia, 1608 and features Smith's adopted coat of arms and motto, vincere est vivere ("to live is to conquer").

The bronze Pocahontas statue was unveiled in June 1922, and stood south of the church, where it could "welcome" visitors coming from off the ferry. It was moved to the low rock base near the APVA entrance gate for the 350th celebration in 1957. In 2014 it was moved slightly to the west to make way for archaeological work.

Also in June 1922, The Colonial Dames of America erected the Hunt Shrine (dedicated to Robert Hunt), the first Anglican minister of the colony. It was designed by Ralph Adams Cram. The shrine frames a bas-relief depicting the 1607 service. It was first set with its back to the James River, but in 1960 it was rotated to face the river from the northern earthwork of the Civil War's Fort Pocahontas. Its inscription, taken from John Smith, reads

Our factions were oft qualified, and our wants and greater extremities so comforted that they seemed easie in comparison of what we endured after his memorable death. ...

The wooden cross that stands near the entrance to the Archaearium museum was erected by the APVA in 1957 to honor the settlers who died in first years of the settlement. The inscription reads:

To the Glory of God and in grateful memory of those early settlers, the founders of this nation who died at Jamestown during the first perilous years of the colony. Their bodies lie along the ridge beyond this cross, in the earliest known burial ground of the English in America.

=== Voorhees Archaearium ===
Officially named the Nathalie P. and Alan M. Voorhees Archaearium, or simply the Voorhees Archaearium, it is a museum with excavated artifacts and exhibits about Jamestown. The building is located over the excavated remains of the last Statehouse in Jamestown, which visitors can see. The museum onsite opened just prior to the 400th anniversary and displays objects that belonged to Jamestown colonists 400 years ago, unearthed from the long-lost James Fort site, in a 7,500 sq ft gallery space that integrates both life and death experiences of the colonists and the landscape they shaped.

== Gallery ==
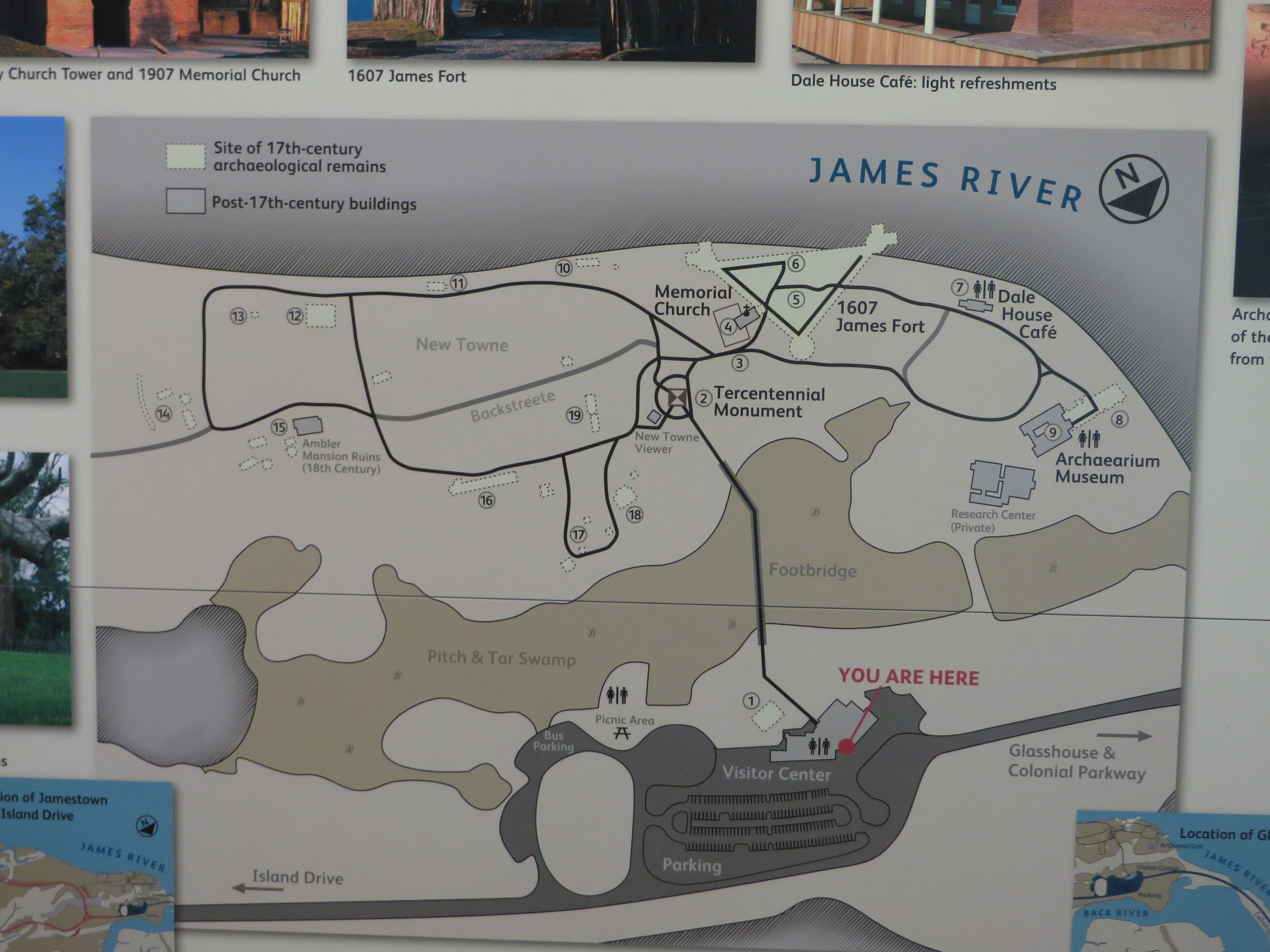
Map of the site

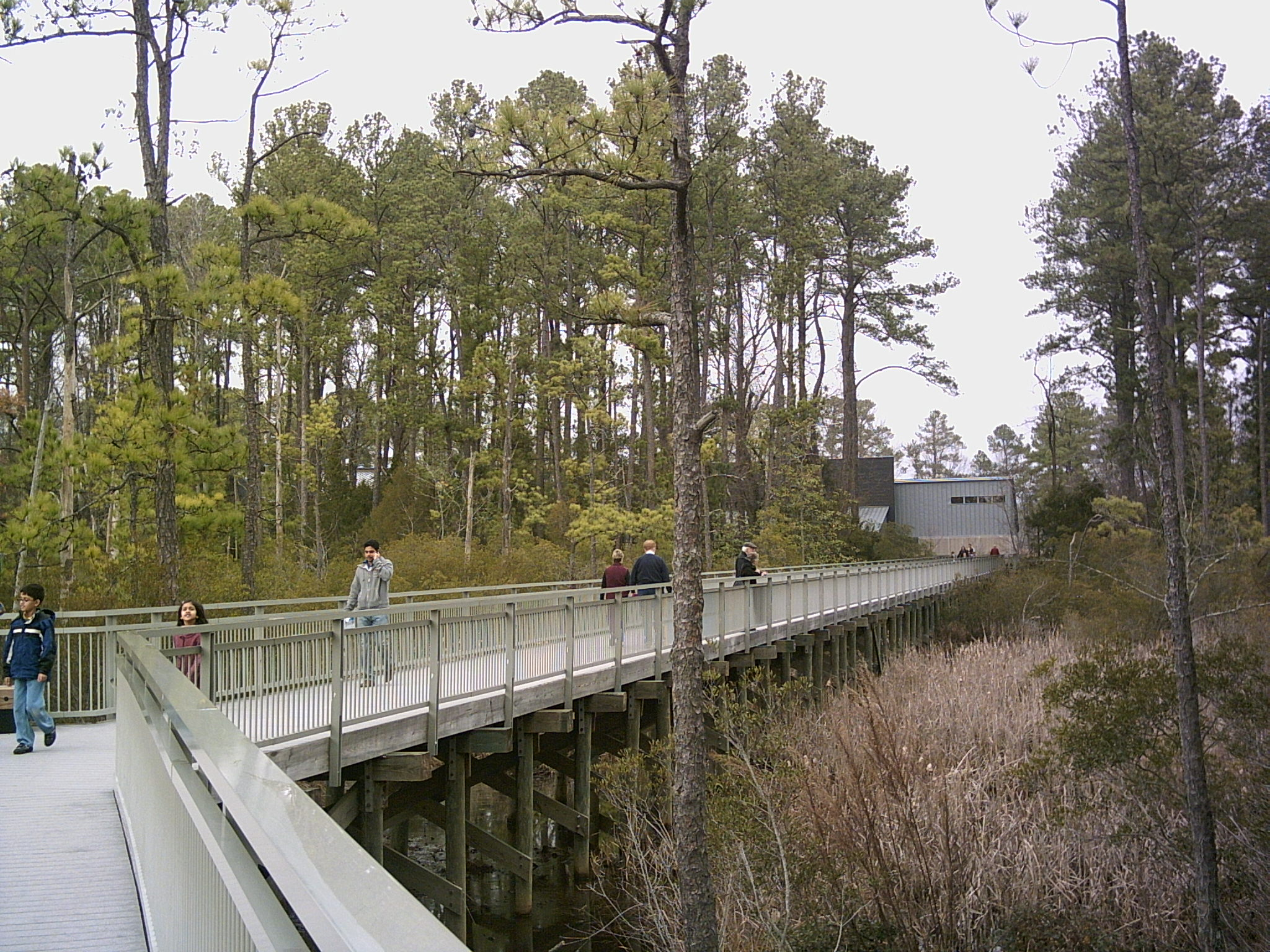
Boardwalk and visitors' center at Historic Jamestown

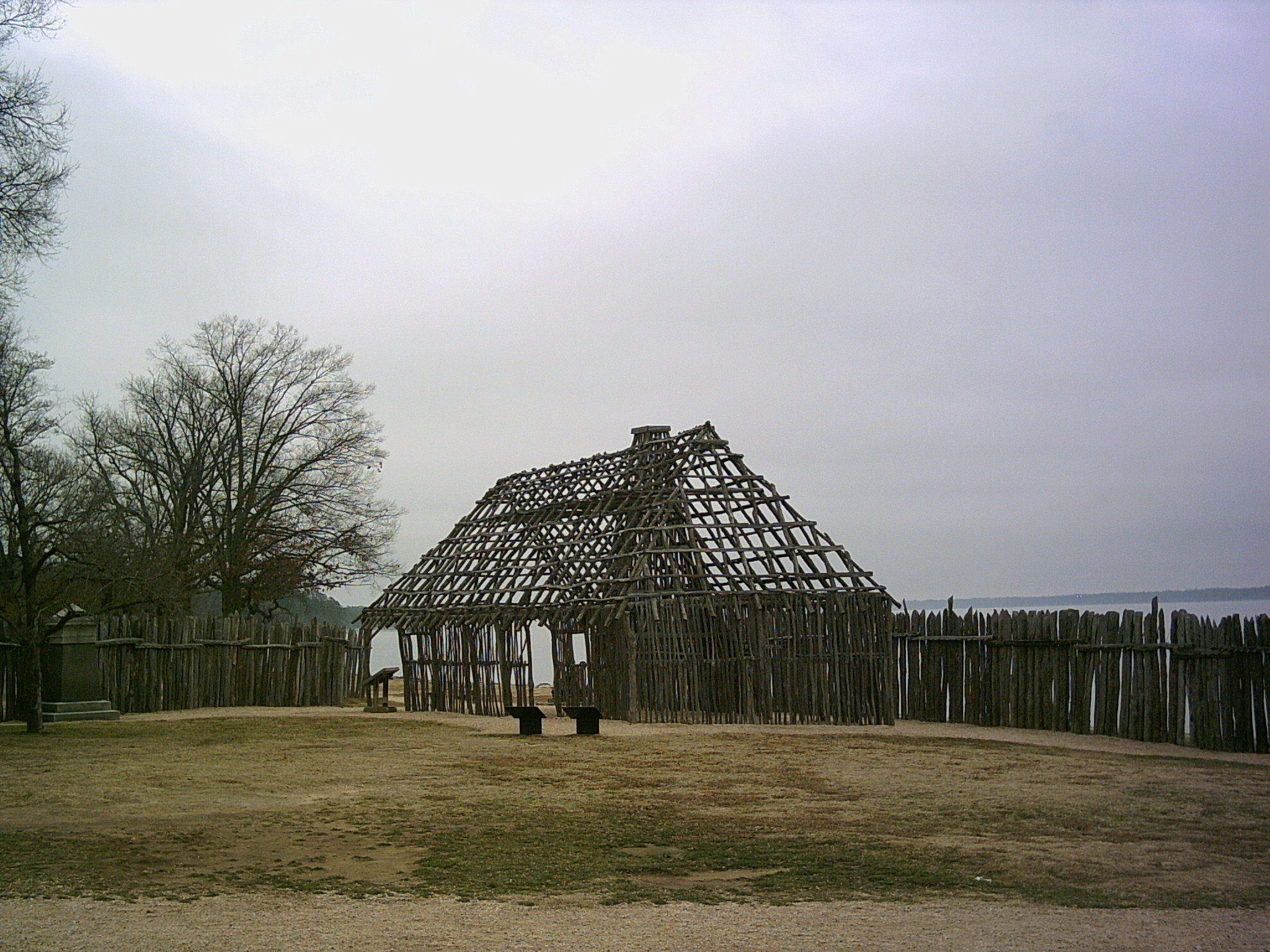
Reconstruction of the barracks at James Fort

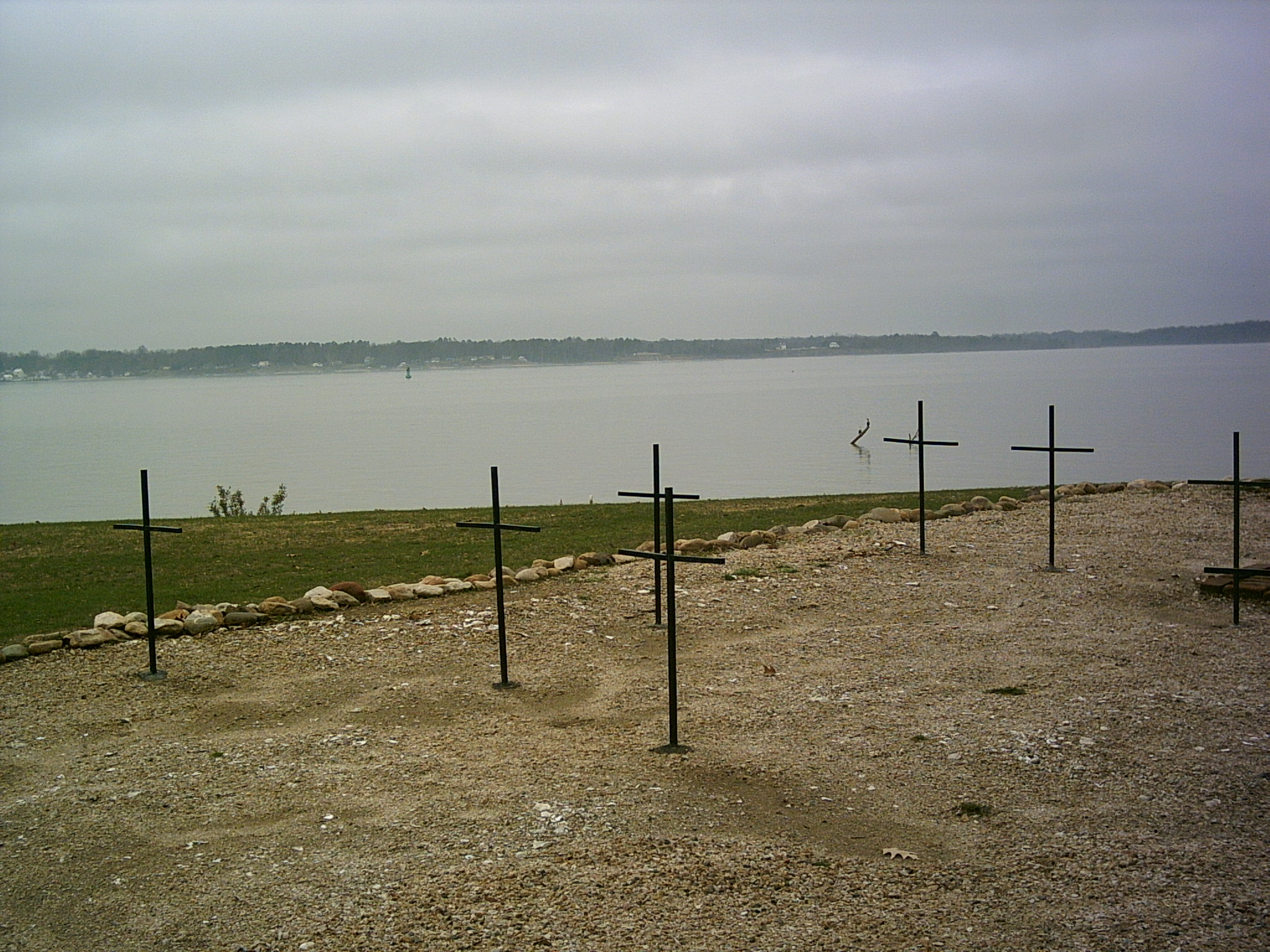
Graves of settlers who died in 1607

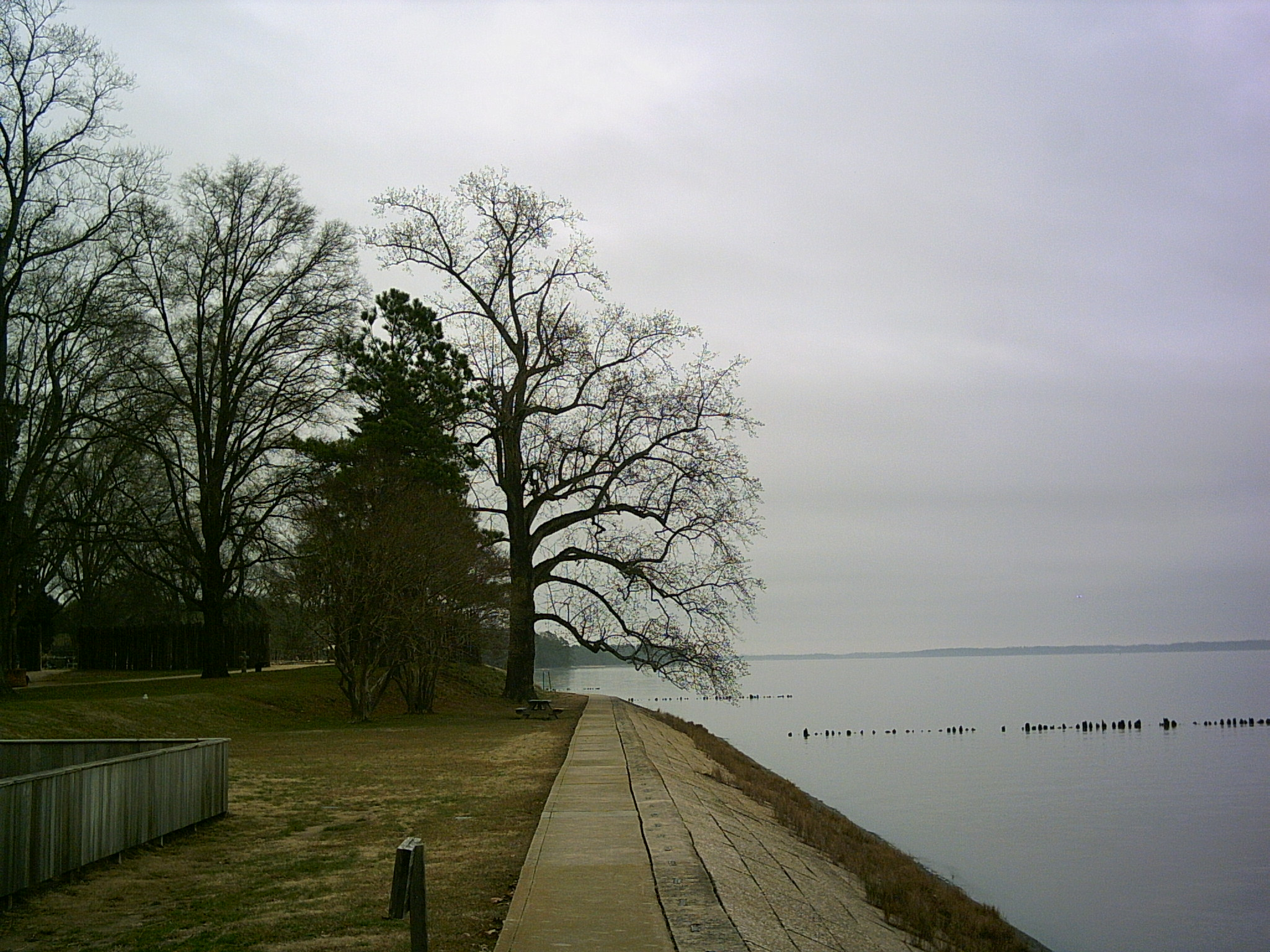
Seawall along the James River

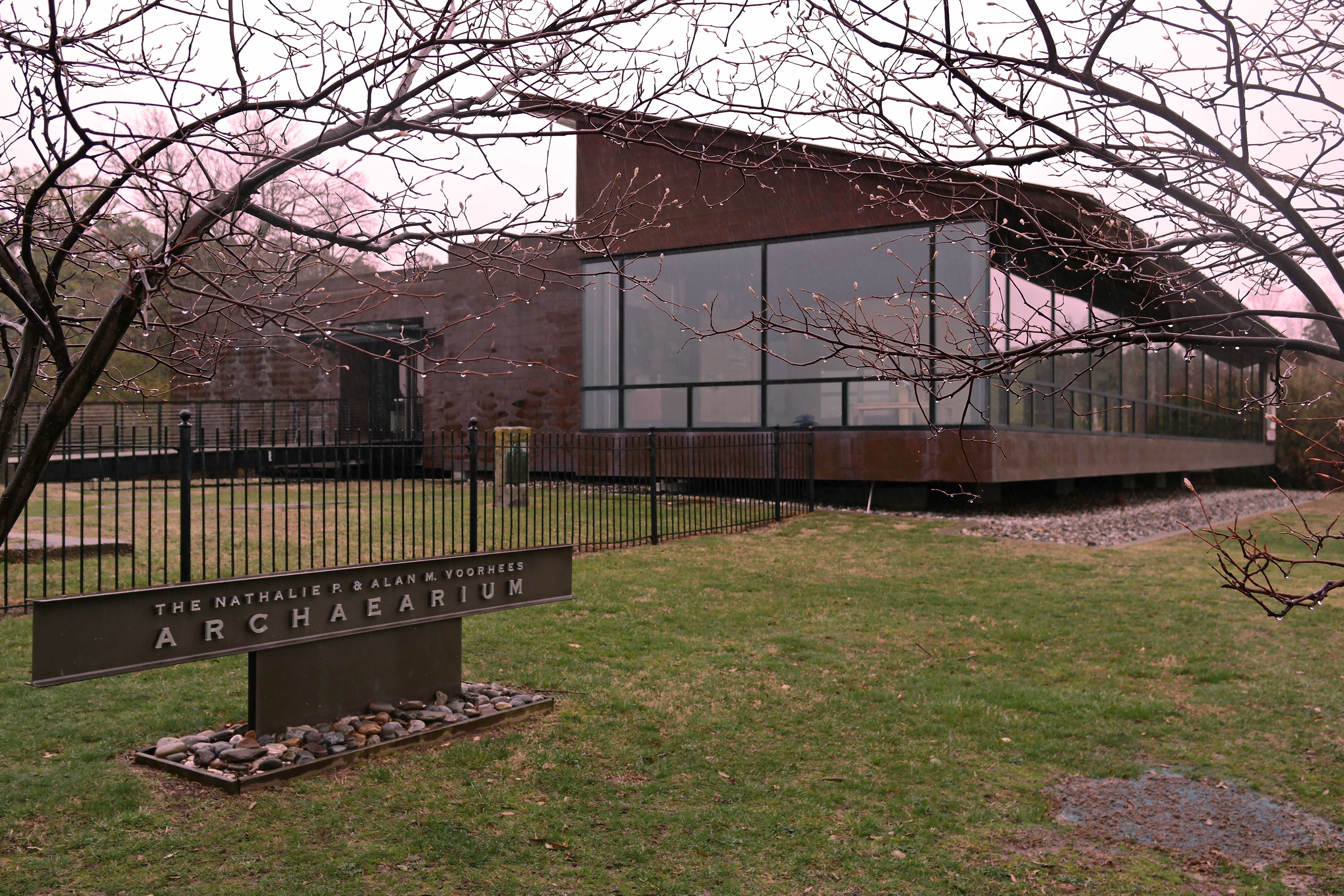
Archaearium

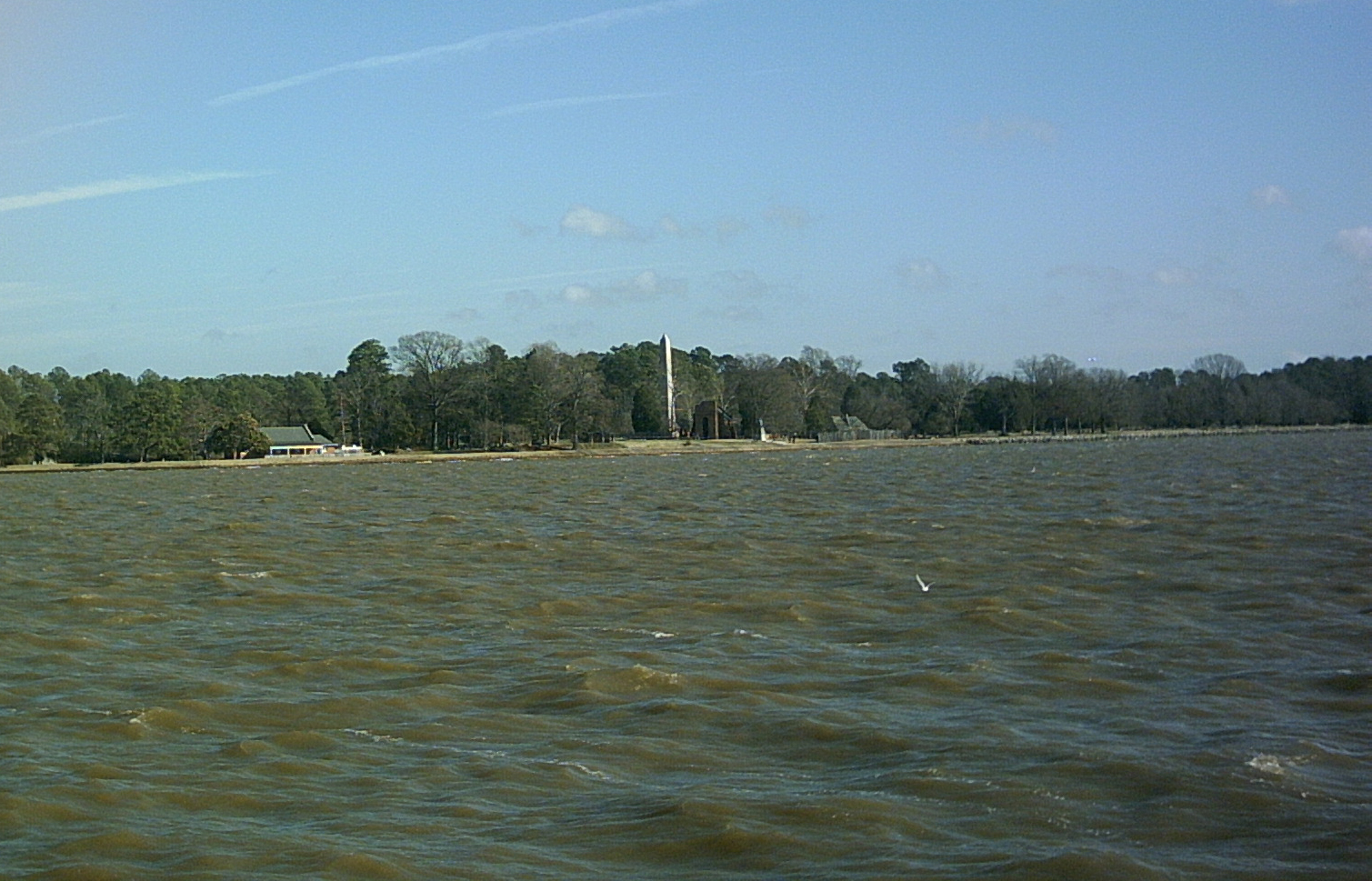
Historic Jamestown seen from the James River Ferry

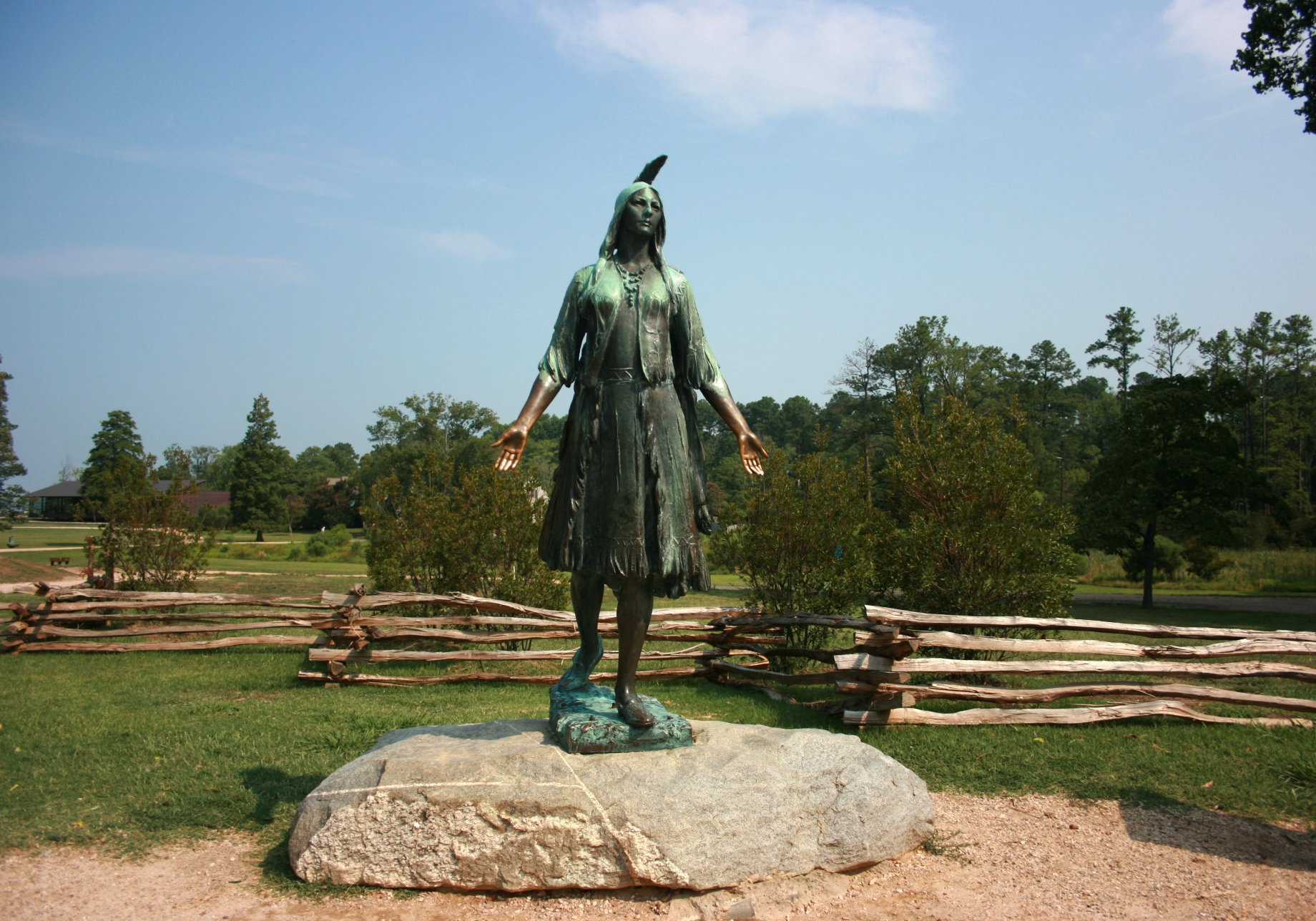
Pocahontas statue, July 2007

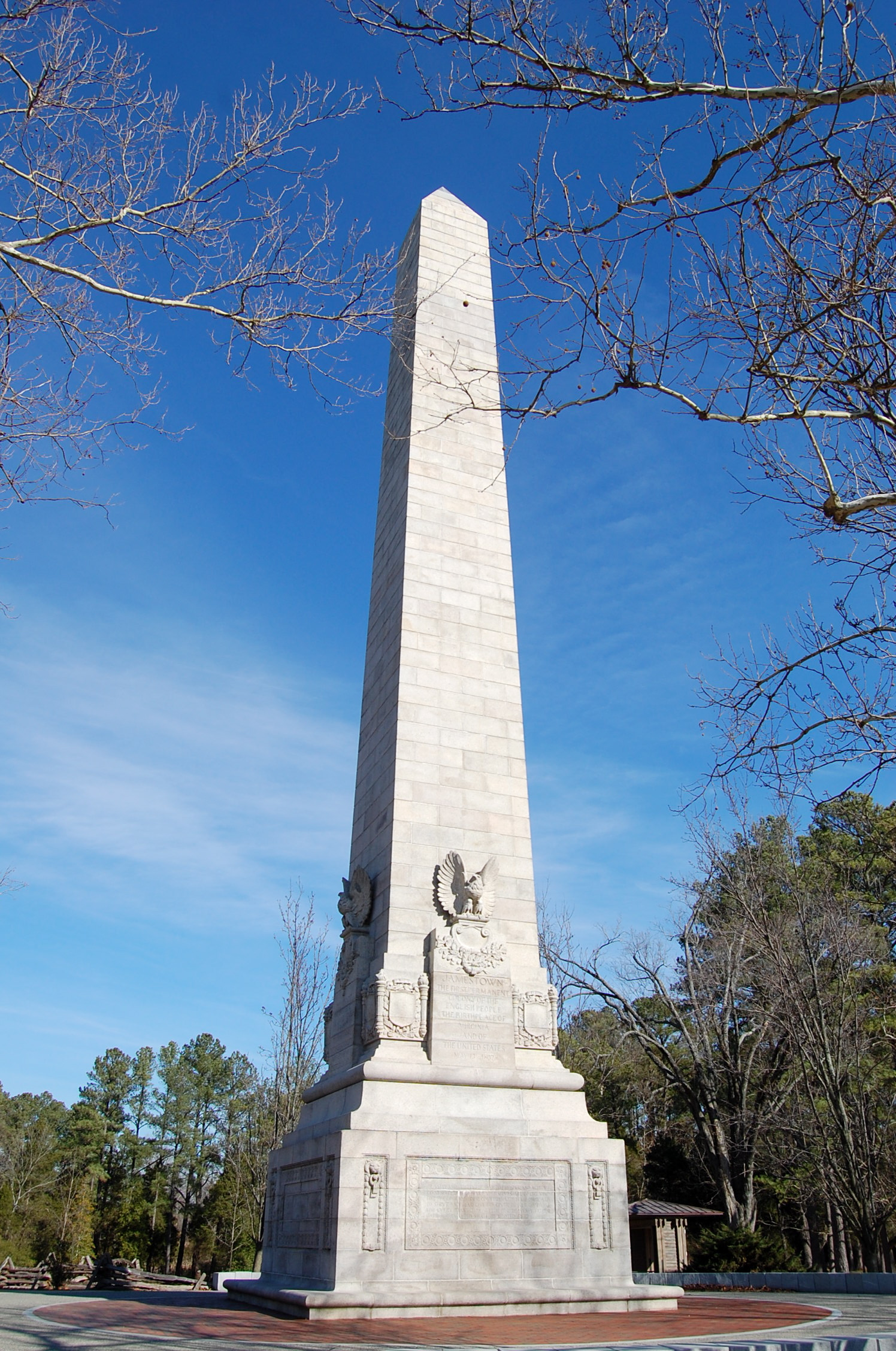
1907 Tercentennial Monument

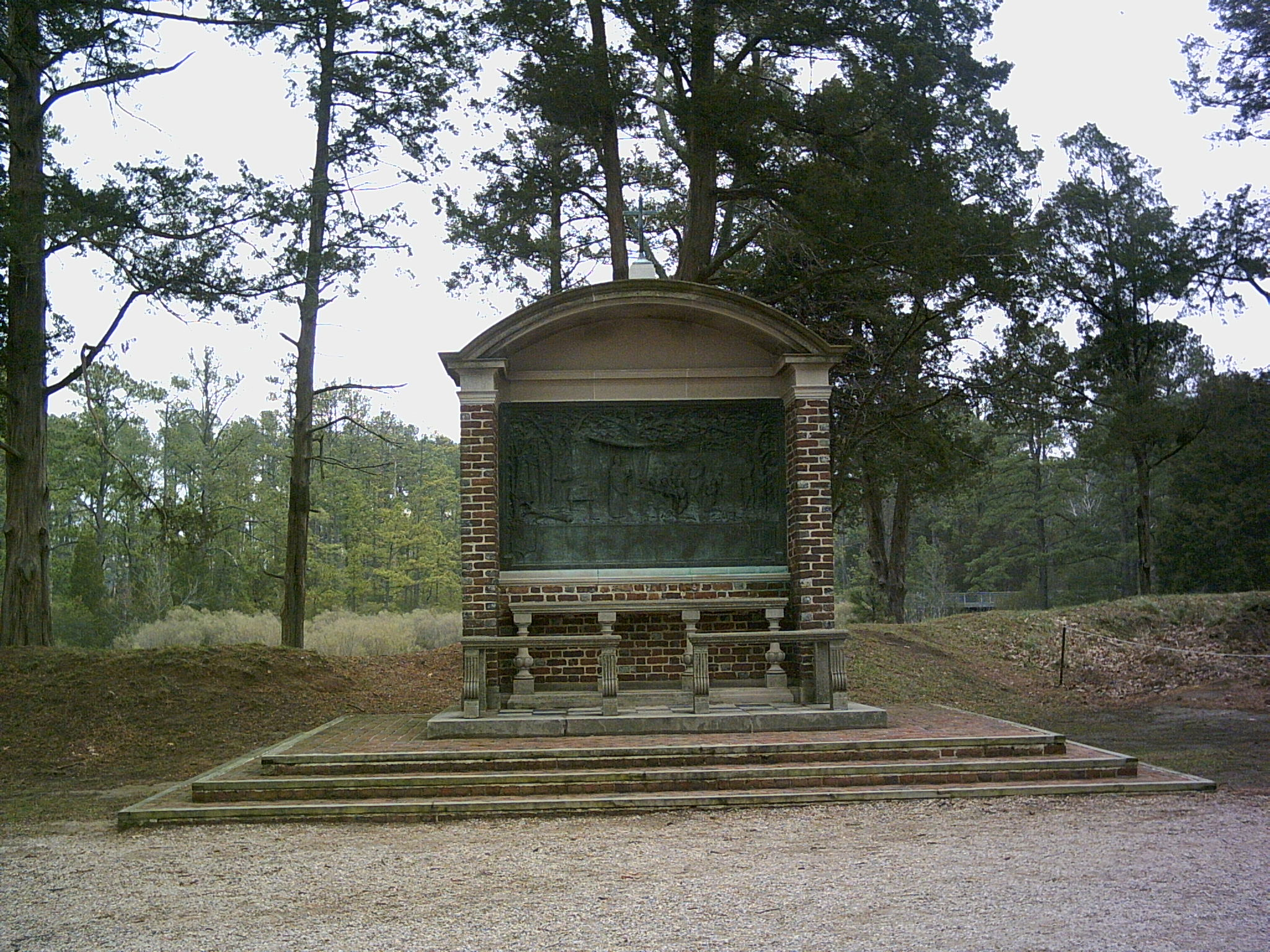
Hunt Shrine

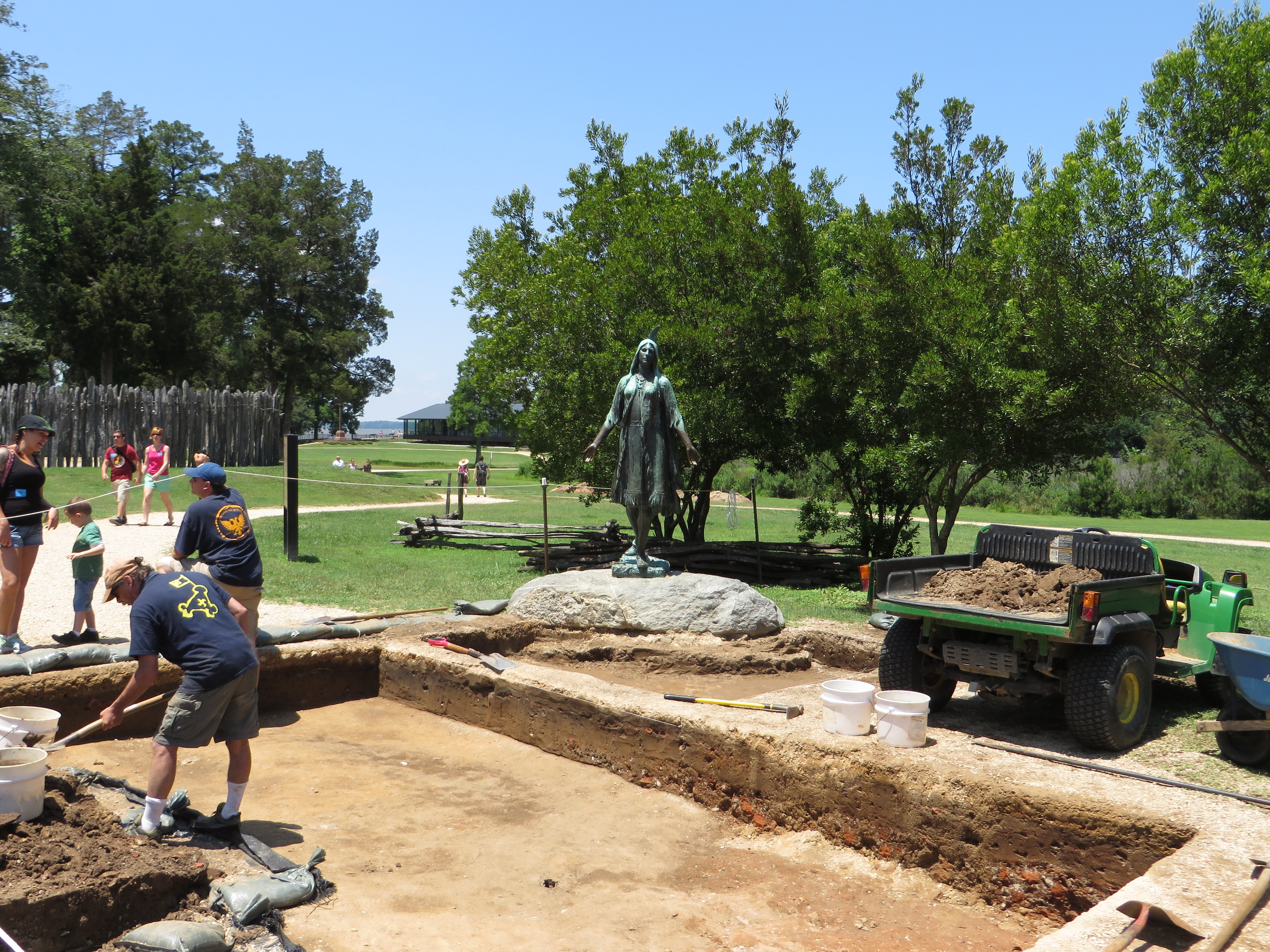
Dig taking place at Jamestown

== See also ==
- History of Jamestown, Virginia (1607–1699)
- Jamestown Settlement
- Colonial Williamsburg
- Colonial Parkway
