= Jamestown Tercentennial Monument =

Monument in Jamestown, Virginia, U.S.

- United States
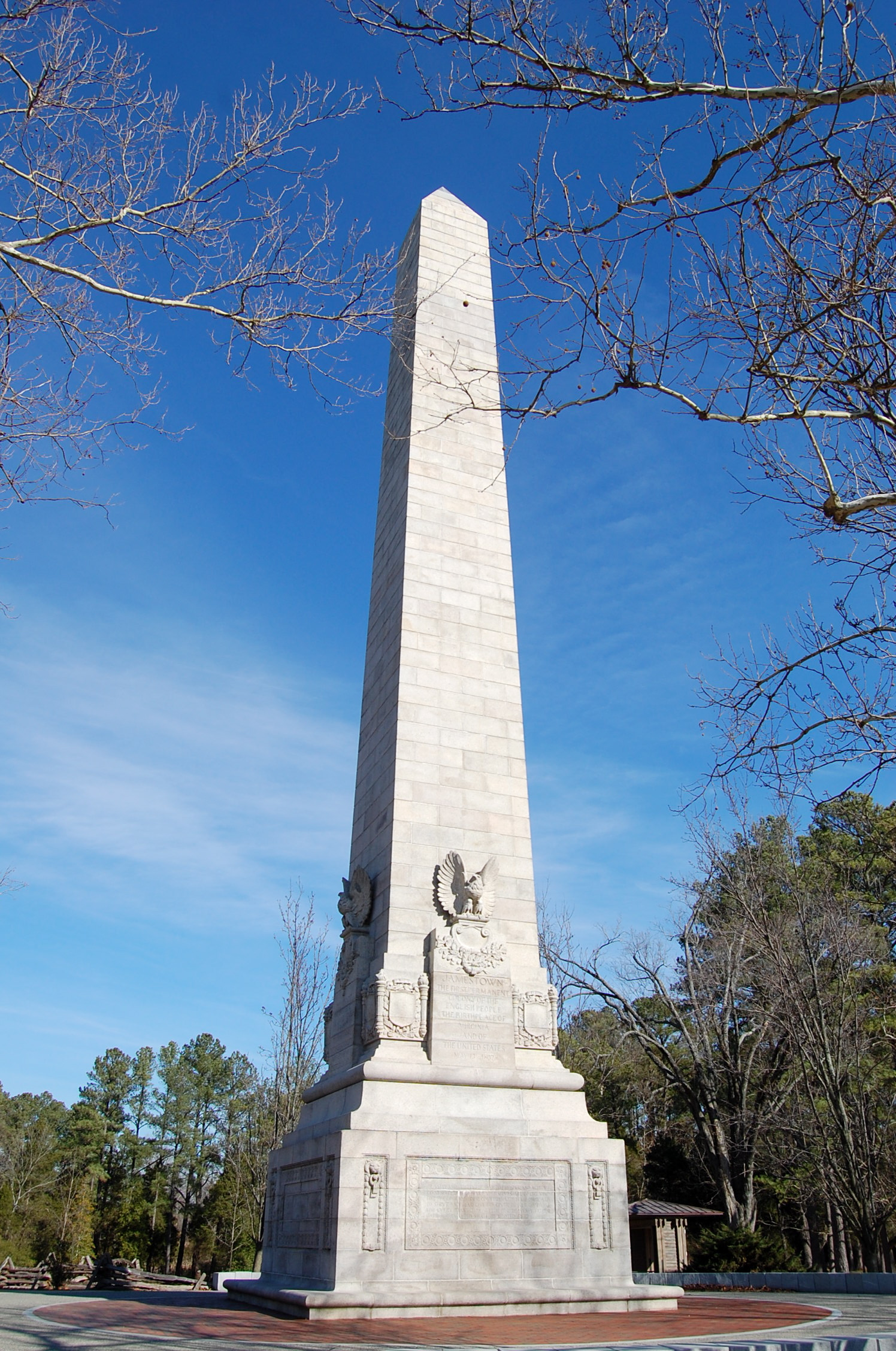
- The monument in Historic Jamestown was erected in 1907.
- For the 300th anniversary of the Jamestown Colony.
- Unveiled: 1907
- Location: 37°12′31.5″N 76°46′39.1″W; Colonial National Historical Park, Yorktown, Virginia

The Jamestown Tercentennial Monument is an obelisk-shaped monument erected in Historic Jamestown in Jamestown, Virginia, commemorating the 300th anniversary of the Jamestown Colony. The monument was installed in 1907.

== Overview ==
In 1907, the U.S. government placed the monument in Jamestown to honor the 300th anniversary of its being settled. It strongly resembles the Washington Monument with its obelisk shape. It is carved of New Hampshire granite and cost $50,000 ($1.69 million in 2024) to build. The monument rises to a height of 104 feet (32 m), one foot for each of the first settlers.

== Inscription ==
The base bears the following inscription:

Jamestown – The first permanent colony of the English people.

The birthplace of Virginia and of the United States – May 13, 1607.

== Gallery ==
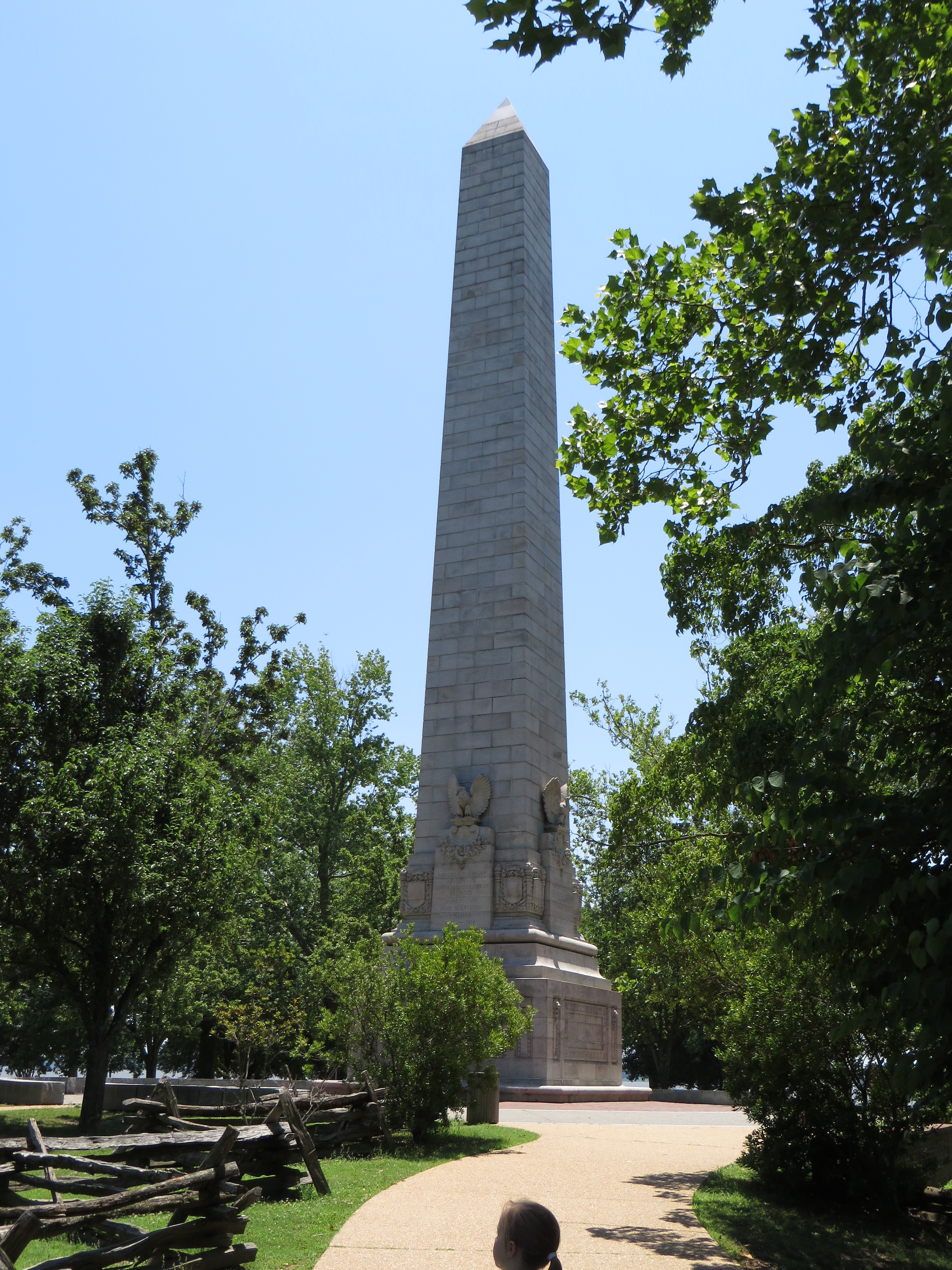

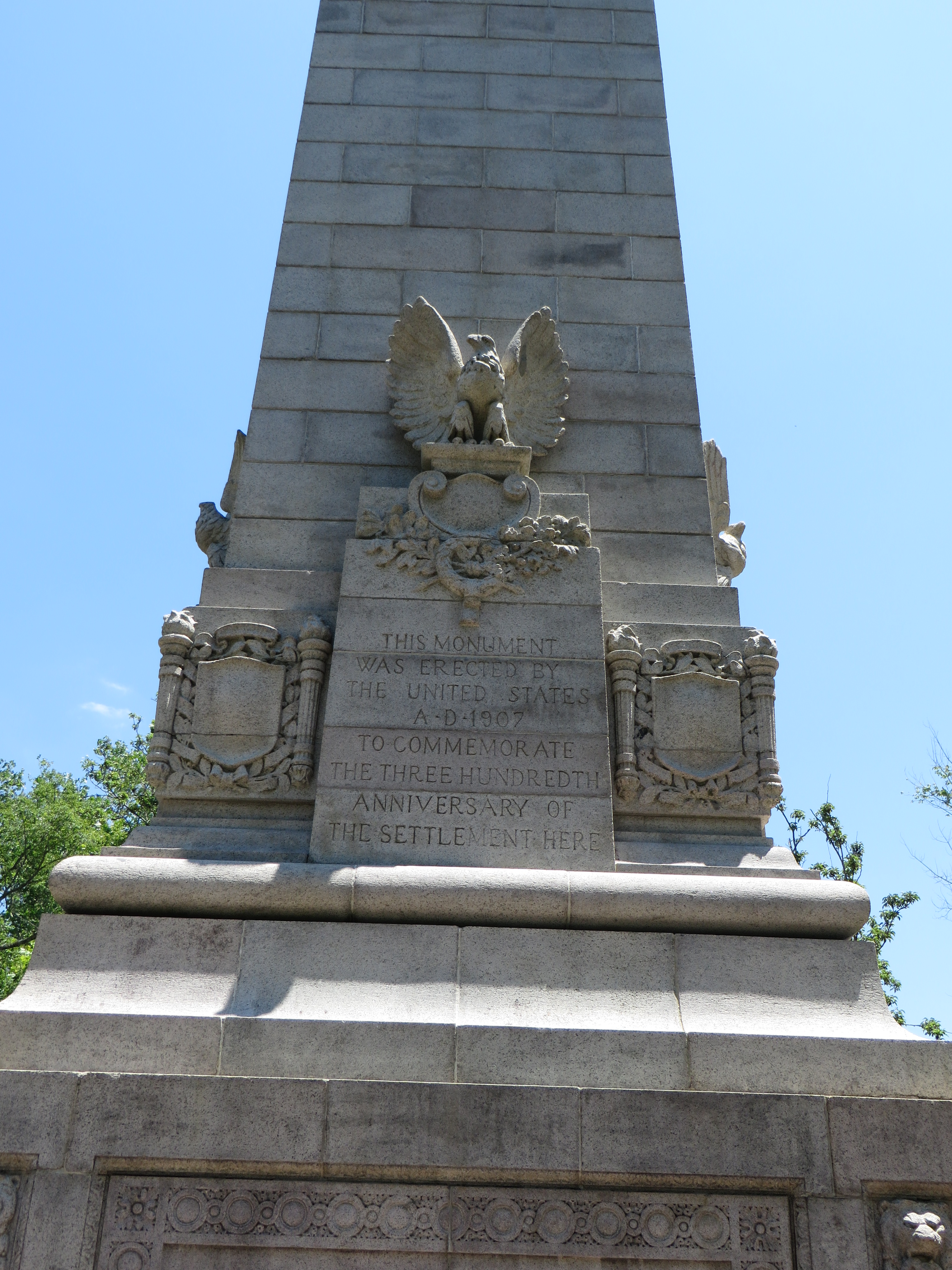

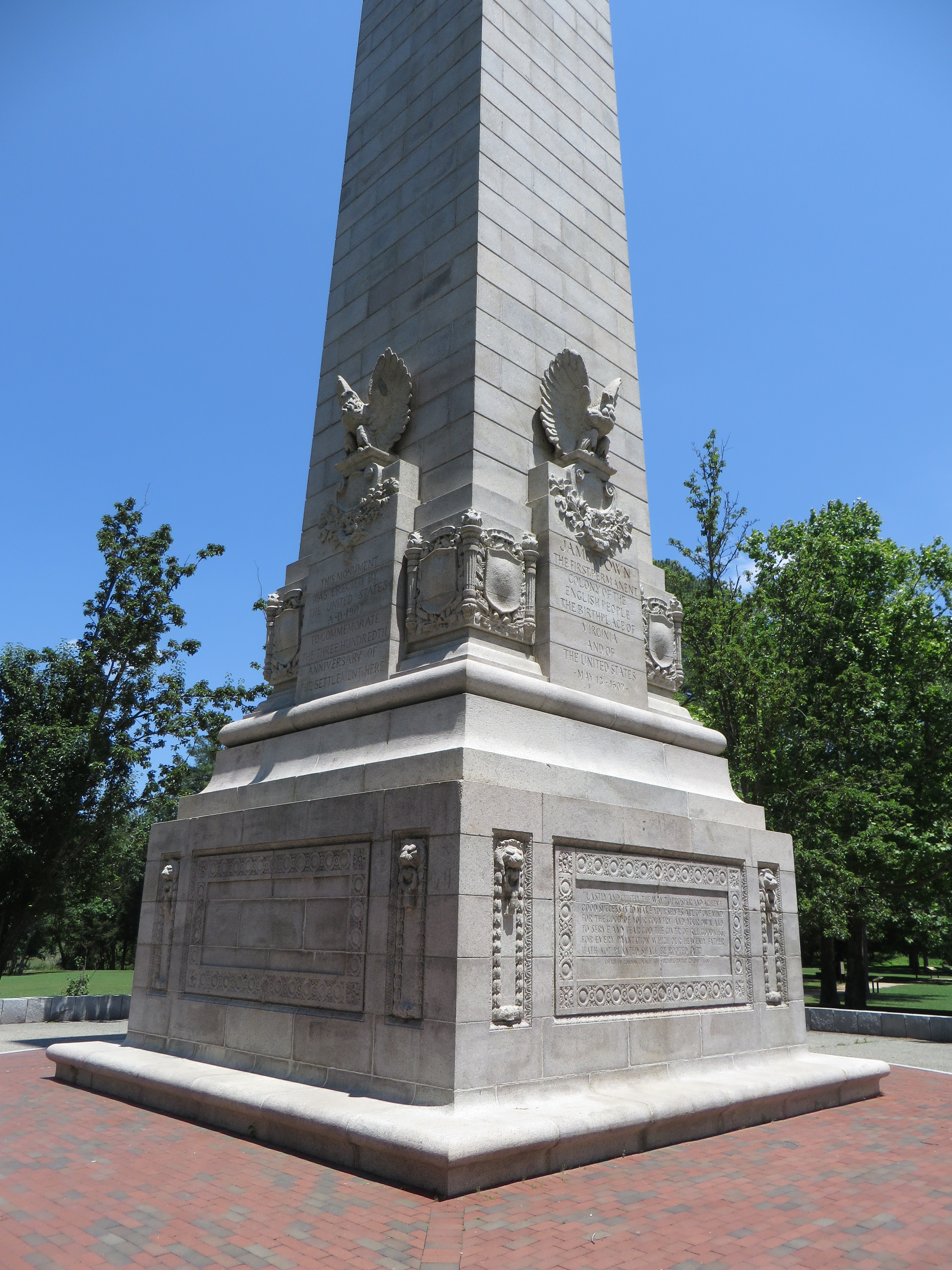

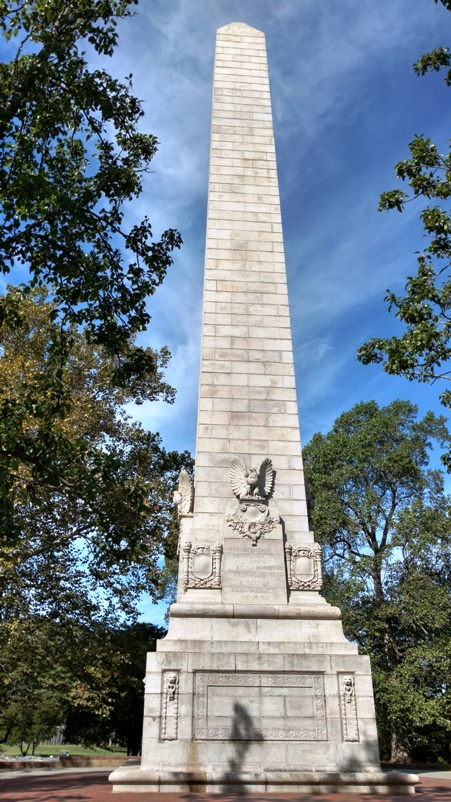

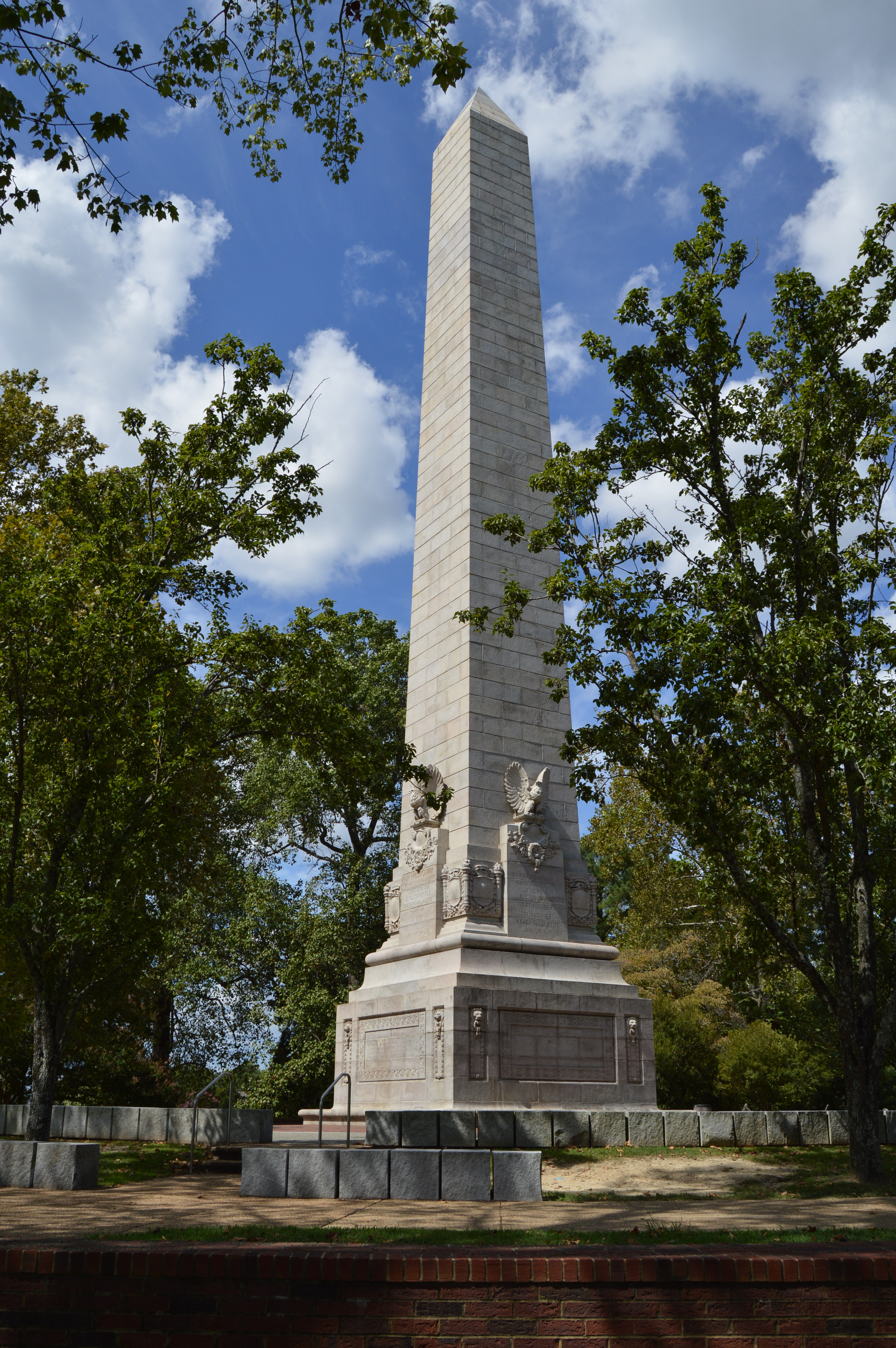

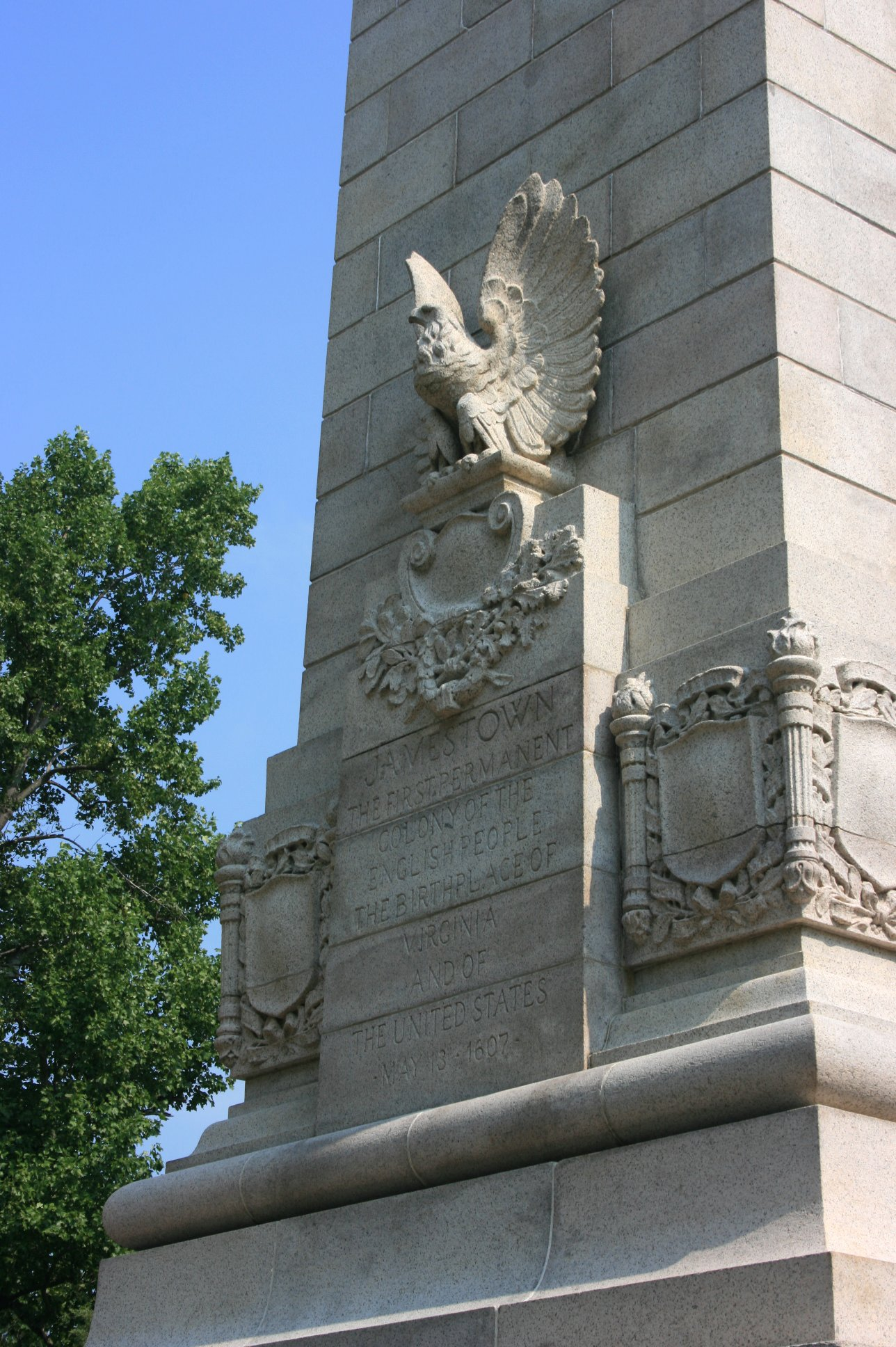

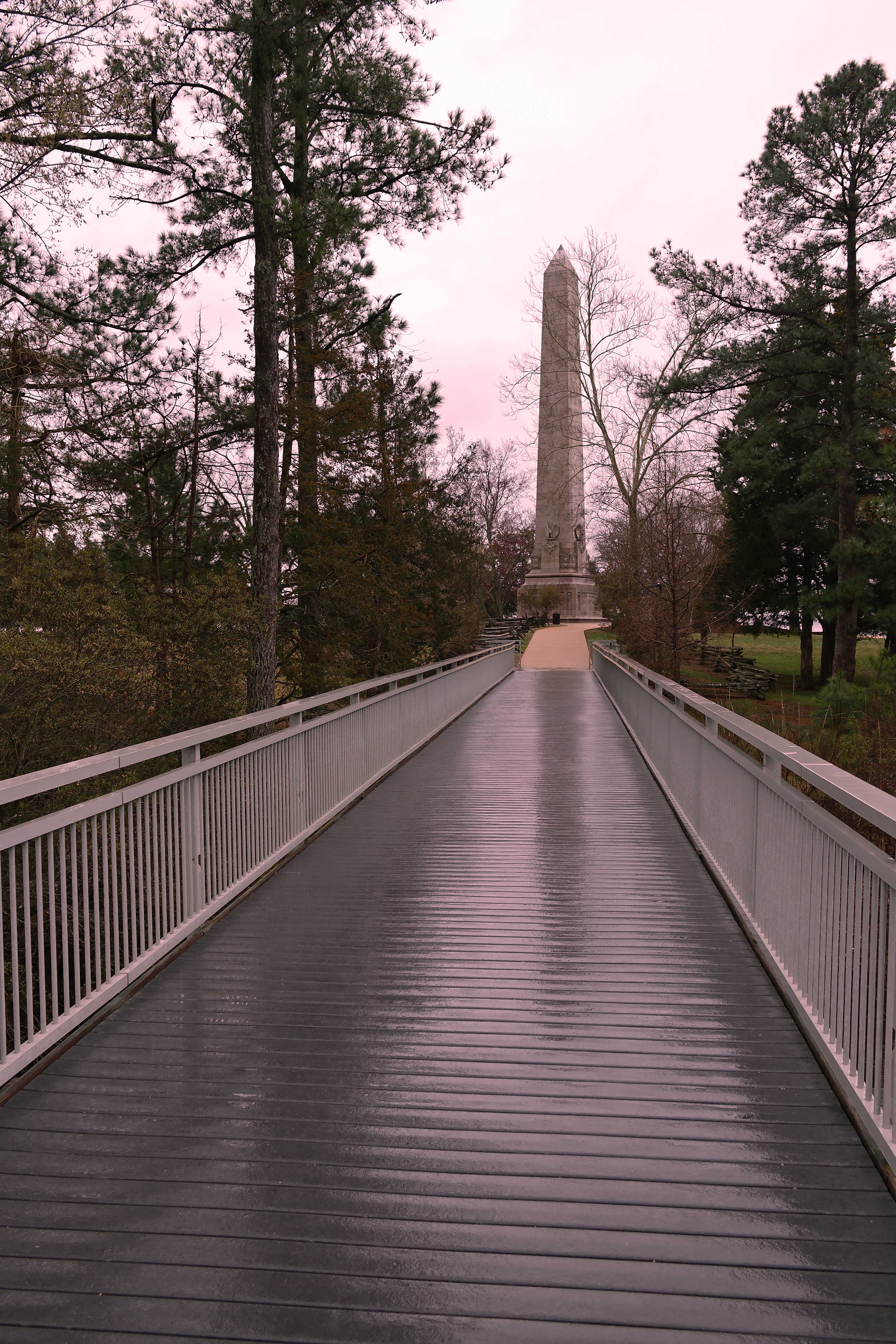

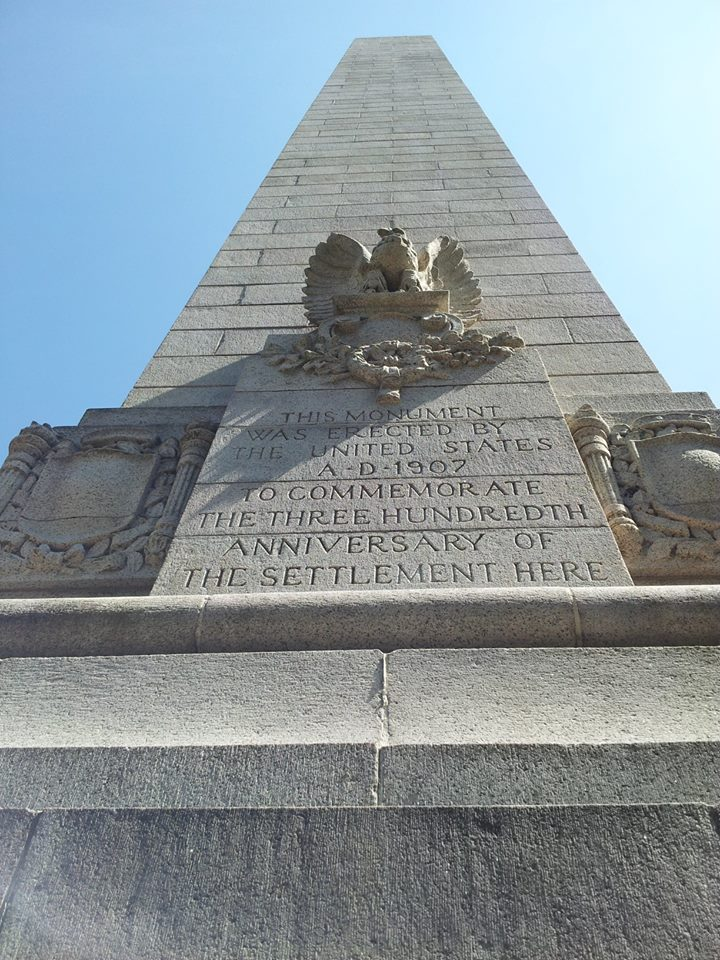

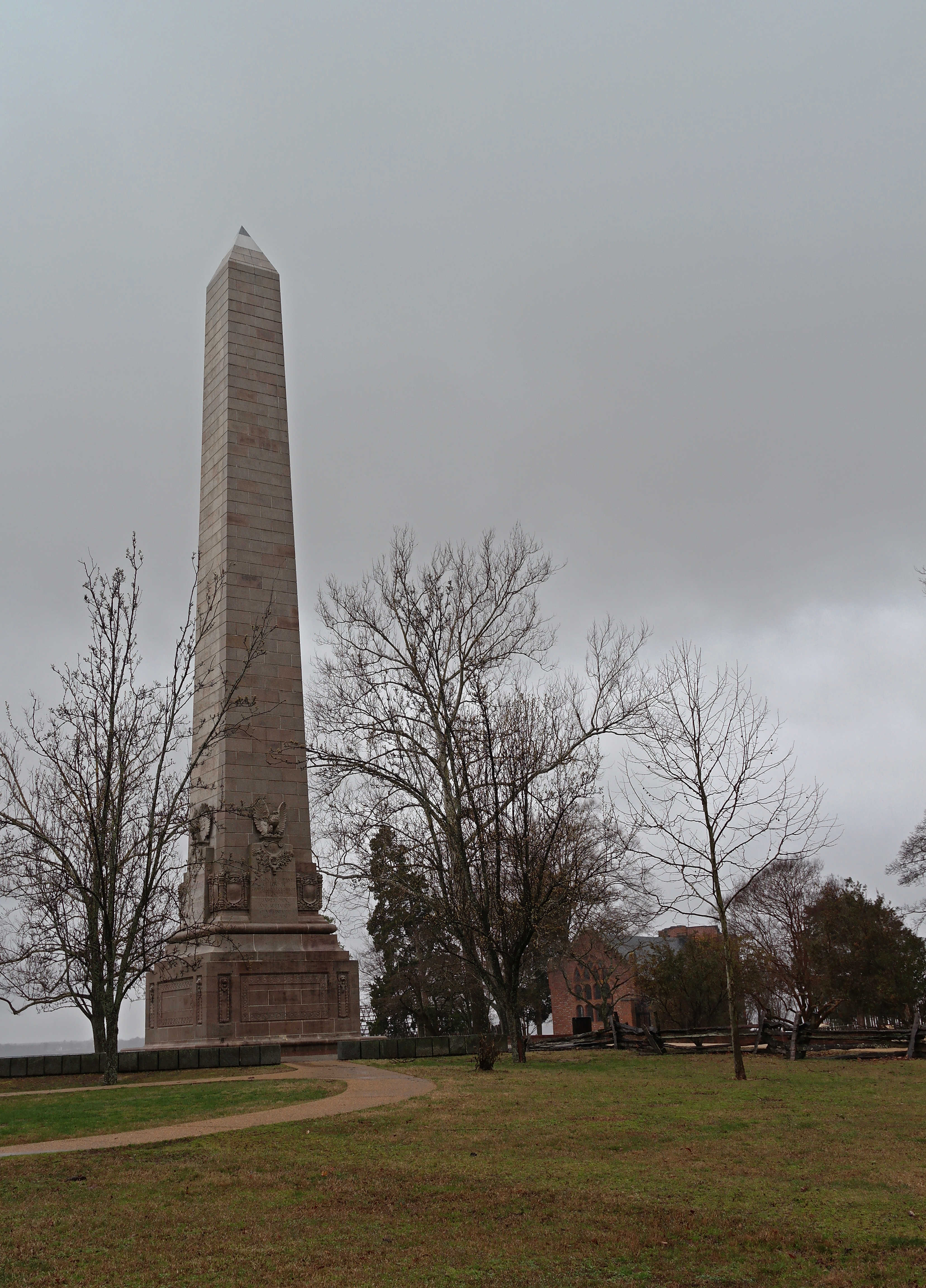
