= Robert Hunt (chaplain) =

English vicar (born 1568/70–1608)

The Reverend Robert Hunt Presbyter
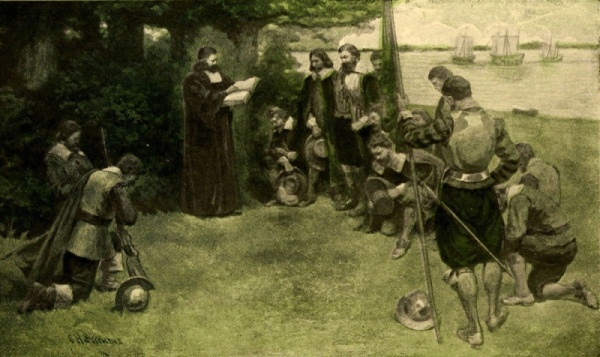
- Depiction of the Virginia first landing, with Rev. Hunt reading scripture to colonists
- Born: c. 1568-1570; Hoath, Kent; Kingdom of England
- Died: 1608 (aged 39–40); Jamestown, Virginia Colony
- Burial place: Jamestown Church, Colony of Virginia
- Occupations: Vicar, Chaplain
- Spouse: Elizabeth Hunt
- Religion: Christian
- Church: Church of England

Robert Hunt (c. 1568x1570 – 1608), a vicar in the Church of England, was chaplain of the expedition that founded the first successful English colony in the New World, at Jamestown, Virginia, in 1607.

== Career in England ==
Hunt was born in Hoath, near Reculver, in Kent, England, in the late 1560s or early 1570s. He was vicar of Reculver from 18 January 1594 until he resigned and was replaced on 5 October 1602. He was forced to leave his wife Elizabeth Edwards and two children Thomas & Elizabeth there in disgrace then, because of his wife's "seeing too much of one John Taylor". In 1606, he was forced to leave his second parish, at All Saints Church, Heathfield, in Sussex, when he was accused of having an adulterous affair with his servant, Thomasina Plumber, as well as "absenteeism, and neglecting of his congregation".

== Joining the Virginia Expedition ==
Summoned to London, Hunt was recruited by Richard Bancroft (the Archbishop of Canterbury), along with Richard Hakluyt Jr. (the geographer and priest) and Edward Maria Wingfield, as chaplain for the newest expedition to the New World by the London Virginia Company. Hunt sailed with his fellow colonists aboard the Susan Constant (helmed by Captain Christopher Newport).

== Cape Henry: First Landing ==
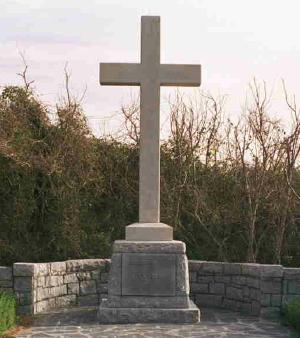
First Landing Memorial Cross at Cape Henry

On 26 April 1607, after an unusually long voyage of 144 days, the three ships and 105 men and boys made landfall at the southern edge of the mouth of the Chesapeake Bay at the Atlantic Ocean. They named the location Cape Henry, in honour of the young Henry Frederick, Prince of Wales, eldest son of their king.

There, Hunt led what was likely the first protestant sermon in America since Sir Francis Drake's landfall at California in 1579, planting a cross at the site. Today, a memorial stands at the location at Joint Expeditionary Base East, near what has become the aptly named First Landing State Park in the current independent city of Virginia Beach, Virginia.

== Jamestown ==
Within a few weeks, the settlers chose a permanent inland site for their colony on the James River, naming it Jamestown in honor of King James I. The location was selected as ordered by the sponsors in London with a priority of being a strategic defensive position against possible attacks by ships of competing European factions. However, this came at a terrible price, as Jamestown Island combined swampy and mosquito-infested land, offering poor hunting and little room for farming with brackish tidal river water and no fresh water springs. While conflicts with the other Europeans never became a problem, getting along with the Native Americans, and even more importantly, with each other almost immediately became major issues for the ill-prepared colonists. Captain Newport soon left to hurry back to England to bring more supplies and replacement colonists. Newport eventually did so three times, twice without mishap, and lastly on the ill-fated Sea Venture, flagship of the Third Supply mission. However, when he left the first time, they were left alone at Jamestown with only the tiny Discovery, so there was no turning back.

Despite the incredibly onerous circumstances of the Jamestown mission's beginnings, Rev. Hunt seemed to rise to the occasion, often mediating disputes between the camp's various factions, smoothing "ruffled feathers" and making peace. He was described by Wingfield as: "a man not in any way to be touched with the rebellious humours of a popish spirit, nor blemished with the least suspicion of a factious schismatic, whereof I had a special care". On 21 June 1607, Rev. Hunt "celebrated [probably] the first known service of holy communion in what is today the United States of America."

== Legacy ==
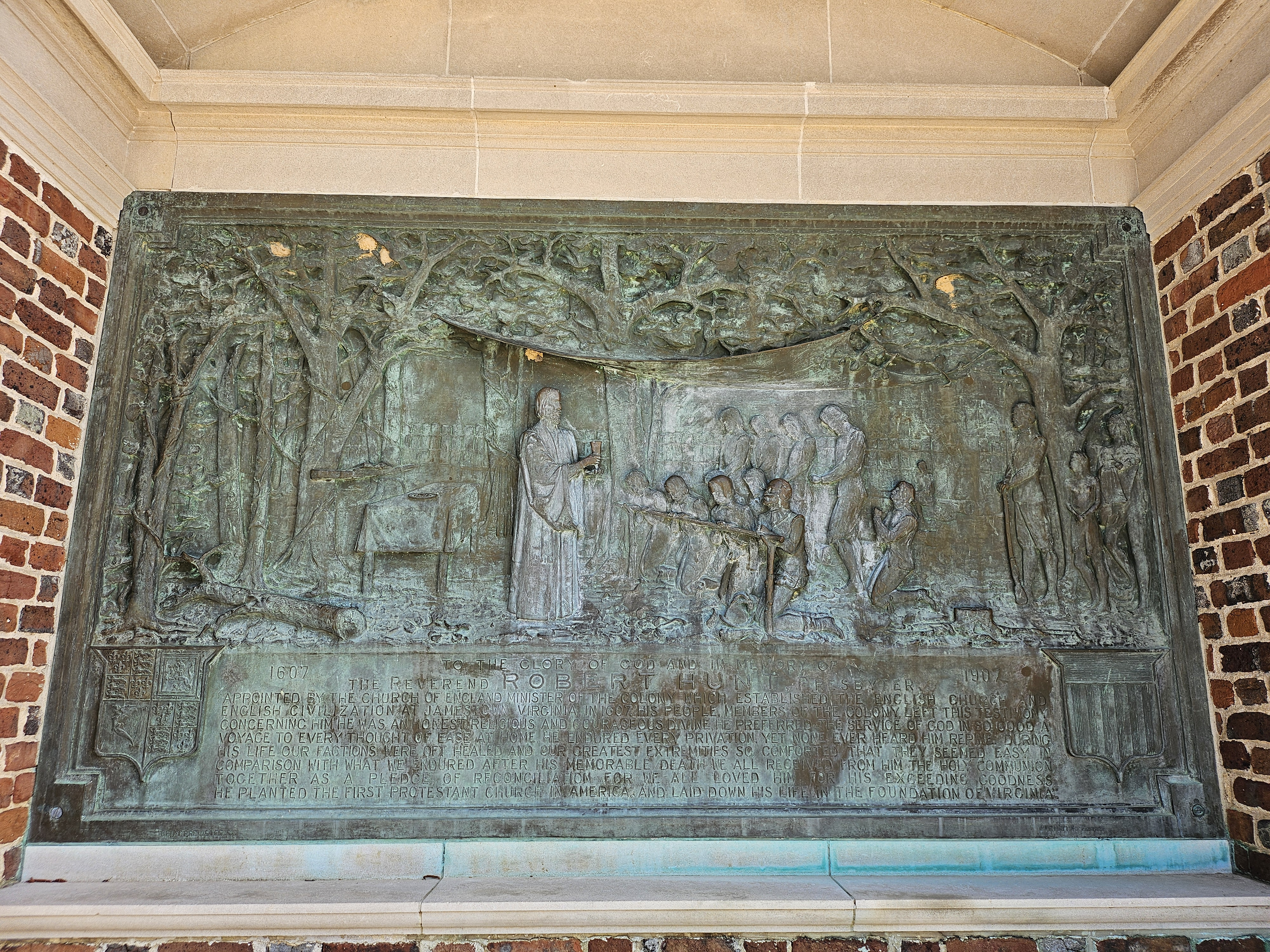
Reverend Robert Hunt shrine at Historic Jamestowne

Today, a shrine sits on the site at the National Park Service's Historic Jamestowne attraction of the Colonial National Historical Park on Jamestown Island. The shrine replicates the outdoor chapel conditions under which he spiritually led the men and boys, most of whom were to die, as did Chaplain Hunt, during the first year. The shrine honours Hunt for his self-sacrifice and leadership in the first, most difficult times for the colony.

Its inscription reads:

"Our factions were oft qualified, and our wants and greater extremities so comforted that they seemed easie in comparison of what we endured after his memorable death...."

Captain John Smith

== Archaeological discovery ==
In July 2015, Smithsonian Institution forensic anthropologists confirmed that remains they had found buried in a church in Jamestown, Virginia, belonged to Hunt.

== See also ==
- Historic Jamestowne operated by National Park Service
- Jamestown Settlement operated by Commonwealth of Virginia
- Jamestown Rediscovery project of archeological work by Association for the Preservation of Virginia Antiquities
- Jamestown 2007 celebrating 400th anniversary
