= Marldon =

Village in Devon, England

Coordinates: 50.459°N 3.599°W

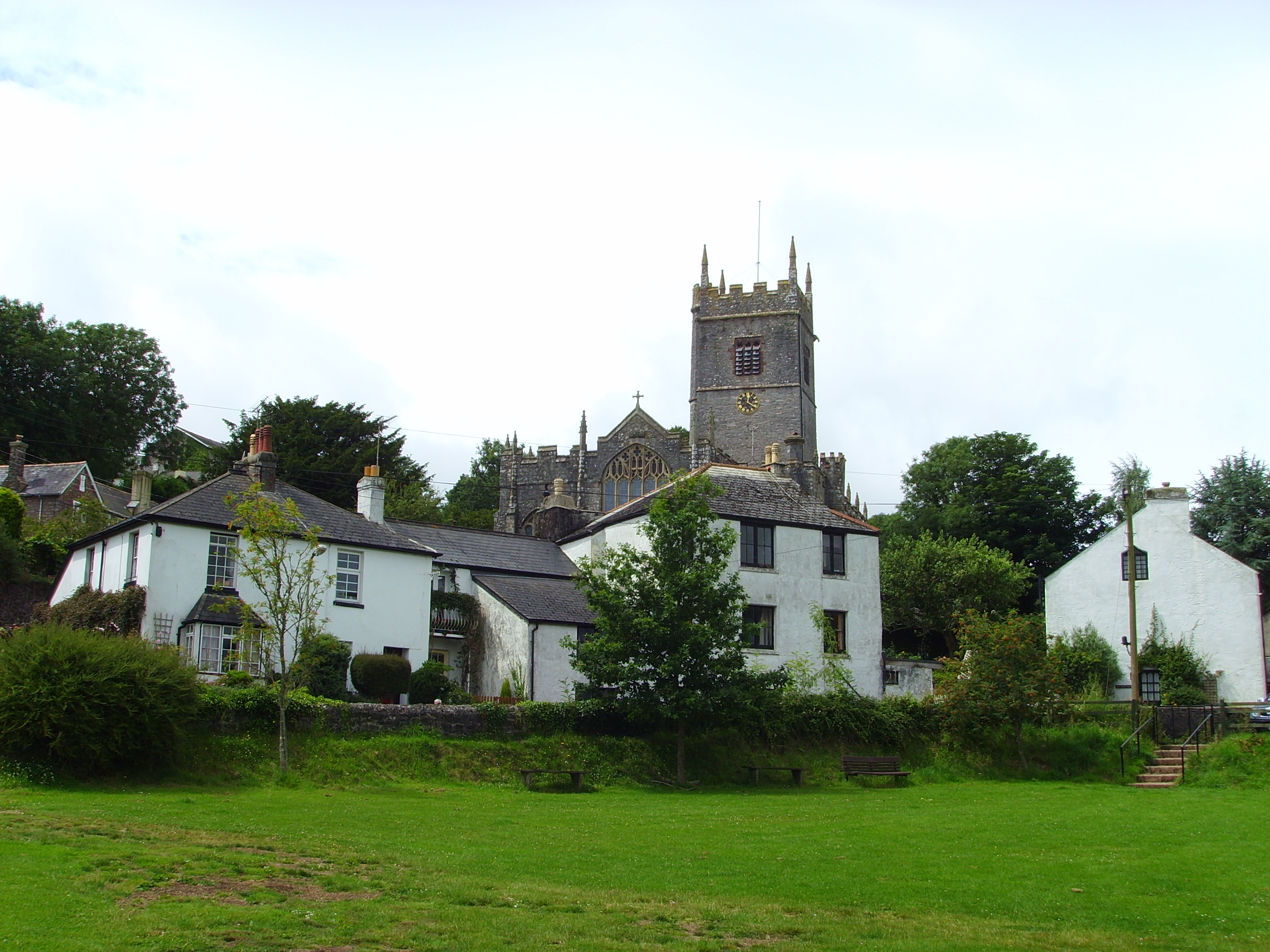
- The old part of Marldon

- Location within Devon
- Population: 2,302 (2021 census)
- OS grid reference: SX868633
- Civil parish: Marldon
- District: South Hams
- Shire county: Devon
- Region: South West
- Country: England
- Sovereign state: United Kingdom
- Post town: Paignton
- Postcode district: TQ3
- Dialling code: 01803
- Police: Devon and Cornwall
- Fire: Devon and Somerset
- Ambulance: South Western
- UK Parliament: South Devon

Marldon is a village in the South Hams in Devon, United Kingdom, to the north-west of Paignton. It is the most northeasterly civil parish in the South Hams and includes the village of Compton with Compton Castle. Beacon Hill transmitting station is on the highest point in the parish.

== History ==
Church records date back to 1598. The parish was in the Haytor Hundred. Marldon was a small village until the 1960s when major residential development took place.

Marldon is known locally for its apple pie fair which originated in the nineteenth century and was revived in 1958.

== Demographics ==
At the 2021 census, Marldon had a population of 2,302 people in 992 households.

Census population of Marldon parish
Census	Population	Female	Male	Households	Source
2001	2,023	1,028	995	876	
2011	2,123	1,077	1,046	942	
2021	2,302	1,194	1,108	992	

== Amenities ==
Marldon is an active community with many clubs and groups meeting regularly.

Two walking trails pass through the village:

- John Musgrave Heritage Trail, a 35-mile route around Torbay
- Totnes-Torquay Trail

== Notable residents ==
- Sir Humphrey Gilbert (1539-1583), adventurer, explorer, soldier and MP, one of the Gilberts of Compton
- Robert Adams (1810–1870), gunsmith and inventor of the double-action revolver
- Elizabeth Goudge (1900–1984), writer, she lived at Westerland from 1939 to 1950. Some of her books are set in the area.
- Ray Tolchard (1953–2004), cricketer, played 10 List A cricket matches for Devon and was an umpire
