= New World Tapestry =

British embroidery, created 1977–2000

The New World Tapestry was for a time the largest stitched embroidery in the world. It depicts English colonisation in North America, Guyanas, and Bermuda between the years 1583 and 1642, when the English Civil War began.

Work began on the tapestry in 1977 and continued for twenty years, with the last stitch made by Prince Charles in 2000. The tapestry was at the British Empire & Commonwealth Museum in Bristol until its closure in 2013. It is now in the collection of the Bristol City Museum and Art Gallery in storage.

== The panels ==
The New World Tapestry, which in its entirety measures 267 ft × 4 ft (81.4 m × 1.2 m), consists of twenty-four panels, each of which depicts the narrative of a particular phase in the period between 1583 and 1642.

Each panel measures 11 ft × 4 ft (3.4 m × 1.2 m).

The figures of the tapestry are rendered in an unmistakably modern, cartoon-like style, but it also follows in the tradition of Tudor and Jacobean canvas work embroidery. The panels are worked in gobelin stitch which entirely covers the ground, and along with pictures of the main scenes of the story, the panels also feature birds, animals, flowers and insects all beautifully worked in bold colours.

— "Bristol and the New World", Aztecs at MexicoLore

The 24 panels of the New World Tapestry
Years	Narrative	People	Plants
1583 (1)	Expedition to Newfoundland	Humphrey Gilbert, Captain William Winter, Robert Davis, Edward Hayes, Richard Clarke, William Cox, Captain Cade, Thomas Edmondes, Thomas Aldworth, Gilbert Staplehill	Common mallow, soapwort, dandelion, thrift, daisy, jessamine, bistort, purple iris, cleavers, heartsease, yarrow
1584 (2)	First Expedition to Roanoke	Walter Raleigh, Philip Amadas, William Grenville, John Wood, Richard Hakluyt, Henry Greene, William Sanderson, Josias Calmady, John Dee, Thomas Harriot, John Sparke	Foxglove, plum, dock, peach, corn marigold, St John's wort, pear, succory, hollyhock, cowslip, tobacco
1585 (3)	Second Expedition to Roanoake	Richard Grenville, Edward Kelley, John White, Thomas Wise, Robert Masters, John Stukley, Christopher Broking, John Arundel, Edward Gorges, Thomas Cavendish, Walter Raleigh	Honeysuckle, dovesfoot, saxifrage, bramble, melilot, peppermint, oxeye daisy, wild pink, mullein, potato, hop
1586 (4)	Roanoke Colony and Fort Raleigh	Francis Walsingham, Ralph Lane, John Harris, Francis Drake, Philip Sidney, Richard Grenville, Thomas Ford, Thomas Luddington, George Raymond, Marmaduke Constable, David Williams	Scabious, parsley, broad leaved dock, Good King Henry, betony, weld, alkanet, crosswort, columbine, hazel, nonesuch
1587 (5)	Fourth year on Roanoke Island	John White, George Howe, Edward Spicer, Roger Pratt, Edward Stafford, Roger Bayle, John Humphrey, George Maynard, Ananias Dare, Eleanor Dare, Virginia Dare	Bird's-foot-trefoil, burdock, houseleek, chervil, forget-me-not, bugle, tutsan, bladder campion, pimpernel, strawberry, thyme
1588–1590 (6)	End of the Roanoke Colony	Richard Grenville, William Winter, John Hawkins, Francis Drake, Anthony Cage, George More, Martin Frobisher, Robert Hughes, Lord Howard of Effingham, Christopher Cooper, Thomas Stevens	Basil, briar rose, bay, periwinkle, feverfew, tansy, willow herb, elder, borage, Alexanders, comfrey
1595–1596 (7)	Expedition to the Guyanas	Walter Raleigh, Lawrence Kemys, Anthony Ashley, John Donne, Thomas Howard, John Hartington, Robert Devereux, Francis Vere, Charles Howard, George Carew, Thomas Bodley	Globe thistle, stitchwort, orpine, water lily, black poplar, wormwood, winter savory, dill, bell heather, flax, sneezewort
1602–1603 (8)	Expedition to Cape Cod	Bartholomew Gosnold, Gabriel Archer, William Strete, John Brereton, John Popham, John Hele, William Parker, Bartholomew Gilbert, Thomas Walker, Edward Hayes, Walter Raleigh	Red valerian, squill, toadflax, Plymouth thistle, archangel, vervain, hedge mustard, lily of the valley, self heal, buttercup, marjoram
1605 (9)	Expedition to Maine	George Waymouth, Henry Wriothesley, Walter Mathew, Wiliam Rosecarrock, Ferdinando Gorges, John Popham, Robert Martin, Thomas Arundell, Richard Aldworth, Thomas Smythe, James Rosier	White rose, violet, groundsel, rest harrow, knapweed, lady's bedstraw, bluebell, fennel, clown's ringwort, lady's mantle, tare
1606 (10)	Plymouth Company and London Company	John Popham, William Parker, George Popham, Raleigh Gilbert, Thomas Hanham, John Maddock, John Dodderidge, William Waad, James Bagg, Henry Challons, Martin Pring	Cotton lavender, lemon balm, bittersweet, willow tree, celandine, meadowsweet, red campion, bugloss, woad, thistle, fumitory
1607 (11)	Jamestown, Virginia	Christopher Newport, Bartholomew Gosnold, Henry Montagu, Robert Cecil, John Smith, Chief Powhatan, George Percy, John Ratcliffe, Walter Cope, Edward Maria Wingfield, Robert Killigrew	Lady's smock, furze, poppy, privet, primrose, pink rose, bindweed, pellitory, cornflower, rue, plantain
1607–1608 (12)	Expedition to Maine, Popham Colony (Sagadahoc)	Francis Popham, William Parker, Matthew Sutcliffe, Richard Champernoune, Thomas Horner, Edward Rodgers, John Mallet, Raleigh Gilbert, George Popham, Roger Warre, Abraham Jennings	Ground ivy, ragwort, great willowherb, agrimony, teasel, rocket, germander, oak, dovesfoot, ribwort, sage
1609–1610 (13)	Bermuda claimed after Sea Venture shipwreck	Thomas Cambell, William Godolphin, William Shakespeare, William Strachey, Thomas Gates, William Craven, George Somers, Matthew Somers, Henry Wriothesley, Richard Frobisher, Robert Aldworth	Yellow iris, orach, rose, hawkweed, wood sorrel, water mint, yellow poppy, gentian, biting stonecrop, Solomon's seal, goldenrod
1613–1614 (14)	Jamestown grows	Samuel Argall, Pocahontas, John Rolfe, Thomas Dale, Thomas Smythe, John Borlase, Prince Charles, John Scobie, Richard Buck, Thomas Hayes, Thomas Savage, John Smith	Spurge, horehound, tormentil, love in a mist, sloe, eyebright, red clover, oxlip, marshmallow, garlic, sow thistle
1616 (15)	John Rolfe brings Pocahontas to England	Michael Drayton, John Rolfe, John Smith, Thomas West, William Shakespeare, John Leman, Edward Lawrence, Thomas Dale, John King, George Yeardley, Ben Jonson	Clary, rhubarb, great burnet, mercury, scurvy-grass, sea holly, wallflower, purple loosestrife, water ragwort, figwort, lime tree
1617–1618 (16)	Failure of Raleigh's Expedition to the Guyanas	Roger North (Oyapoc), Robert Trelawney, Henry Rolfe, Lewis Stukley, Henry Montagu, Robert Tounson, Samuel Argall, Nicholas Frankwell, Walter Raleigh, John Bingley, Edward Coke	Tamarisk, nepeta, tarragon, hellebore, sweet William, cherry, Prince of Wales' feathers, holly tree, gooseberry, mouse ear, mulberry
1619 (17)	House of Burgesses, Slaves and Bartered Brides	George Yeardley, William Paget, Henry and Thomas Lyle, William Cavendish, William Herbert, John Mason, Edward Seymour, William Cockayne, Robert Spencer, William Tucker, Edwin Sandys	Chickweed, wortleberry, service tree, cocks head, woodrush, opium poppy, avens, onion, yam, beech, orchis
1620 (18)	Mayflower Compact	John Robinson, Edward Winslow, William Brewster, Henry Wallis, Ferdinando Gorges, William Bradford, Gerryt Lanaertz, Edward Richards, John Plumleigh, Thomas Fownes, John Carver	Speedwell, chamomile, mayflower, valerian, rosemary, lavender, nettle, herb Robert, wild arum, ivy, spearmint
1621–1623 (19)	Indian Raids, beginning of New Hampshire	David Thompson, Leonard Pomeroy, John Mason, Thomas Hobson, Robert Rich, Abraham Colmer, Edward Hilton, Robert Gorges, Alexander Shapleigh, Myles Standish, Thomas Weston	Indian corn, crab apple, barberry, French lungwort, white clover, barren strawberry, lungwort, runner bean, currant, horse chestnut, lilac
1624–1630 (20)	Massachusetts Bay Colony, Dorchester Company	John White, John Warham, John Wolstenholm, Roger Conant, Thomas Morton, Edward Rossiter, Thomas Holcombe, Roger Clap, Jonathan Gillett, John Endecott, James Gould	Rocket, snowdrop, pasque flower, garlic mustard, hyssop, wolf's bane, cranesbill, dead nettle, elm, leopard's bane, fritillary
1630 (21)	Massachusetts Bay Colony, John Winthrop	Adam Winthrop, William Laud, Richard Saltonstall, Hugh Peter, Matthew Craddock, Isaac Johnson, John Winthrop, Emmanuel Downing, William Coddington, William Pynchon, John Underhill, John Taylor	Loosestrife, musk mallow, hounds-tongue, white bryony, hairless catmint, spindle, organy, Jacob's ladder, American winter cress, brooklime, campion
1628–1634 (22)	Calvert family and the Province of Maryland	George Calvert, Cecil Calvert, Leonard Calvert, Richard Blount, Thomas Dorrell, Thomas Cornwallis, Richard Gerard, Jerome Hawley, Henrietta Maria, Edward Winter, Jerome Weston, Nicholas Ferfax	Dyer's greenweed, quince, scarlet pimpernel, nettleleaved bellflower, sea beet, asparagus, sand spurrey, meadow clary, marsh marigold, monkshood, sweet cicely
1635–1641 (23)	New England, Harvard College and Taunton	Nicholas Frost, Anne Hutchinson, John Eliot, Nathaniel Eaton, Henry Dunster, Thomas Gorges, Roger Williams, Drapers Company, John Harvard, Elizabeth Pole	Pennyroyal, scabwort, astrantia, vetch, wayfaring tree, dark mullein, centaury, green alkanet, saxifrage, corn cockle, sweet woodruff
1642 (24)	Great gardeners and herbalists. English Civil War begins	William Turner, Edward Seymour, Henry Lyte, Robert Cecil, Thomas Johnson, Nicholas Culpeper, John Gerard, John Tradescant the Elder, John Parkinson, Henry Danvers, John Tradescant the Younger	Simpson, fleabane, pot marigold, Scots rose, stag's horn sumach, larkspur, navelwort, wild candytuft, spiderwort, charlock, aster

== The creation of the tapestry ==
The designer was Tom Mor, who also designed the Plymouth Tapestry at Prysten House, Plymouth, the Adventurers for Virginia (London) Tapestry, and was the consultant on the Jersey Liberation Tapestry (St Helier, Channel Islands) and the Plympton Tapestry (Plympton, Devon). The panel was researched by Tom Mor, Tom Maddock, Paul Presswell and Freda Simpson. Chief tapissiers were Joan Roncarelli and Renée Harvey. A New World Tapestry Website has been developed as of December 2008 and will soon include 120 pages, showing all complete panels.

Research for the New World Tapestry's twenty-four panels began in 1980. Tom Mor was joined by Tom Maddock, a retired friend from Ivybridge. Over the months they travelled hundreds of miles together, researching the two hundred sixty four people who would be named on the tapestry. Heraldic expert Paul Presswell of Buckfastleigh identified all the coats of arms of the people, colleges and companies involved. The result has been the creation alongside the tapestry of a library of files on each person and a collection of reference books of great use to researchers, scholars and teachers.

Two hundred sixty four armorial shields run along the top and bottom tapestry borders throughout its length, alternating with illustrations of the same number of flowers of herbs, medicinal plants, trees and shrubs. The latter are shown because the colonists took ointments and cure-alls with them on their voyages and plant hunters returned with such things as the potato and tobacco.

All the flowers and florets depicted were drawn from nature by Tom Mor, who studied them under a watchmaker's glass. He was helped from the very early days by Freda Simpson of Plymouth, who was passionately interested in herbs and old herbal remedies. She identified and gave him over 230 flower specimens in the years that Mor lived with his wife and family in Plymouth. Later they moved to Cambridge where he was able to complete the set of 264 drawings with the help of Clive King and Caroline Lawes of the Cambridge University Botanic Garden, Lady Jane Renfrew of Lucy Cavendish College and Alison Davies, Monica Stokes and Edna Norman.

=== The stitchers ===
Tom Mor could not have seen his canvasses brought to life without the help of his friends and the expertise of the dedicated tapissiers. When the very first stitch was made in the New World Tapestry in 1980, the team working in Prysten House numbered twenty. By the time the last stitch was made in March 2000, the number of tapissiers had increased to two hundred fifty-six with the addition of another eight centres. In Devon there was a second in Plymouth at HMS Drake (the Royal Navy's panel), Ivybridge, Chillington, Exeter, Bideford, Totnes and Tiverton Castle. Dorset's Tapestry centre was in the Guildhall at Lyme Regis and it was there that the Great Gardeners and Herbalists panel was stitched.

The first oblique Gobelin stitch was made on 26 September 1980 in Prysten House in Plymouth, by U.S. Ambassador the Hon. Kingman Brewster. The coat of arms of His Excellency's ancestor, Pilgrim leader William Brewster, appears on the 1620 Mayflower Panel.

The last oblique Gobelin stitch was made by The Prince of Wales on 3 March 2000 in the Orchard Room of his home at Highgrove House in Gloucestershire. Most fittingly, with his interest in history and a keen gardener himself, the Prince put his golden wool stitch in the date of the 1642 Great Gardeners and Herbalists' Panel.

Stitches have also been added by Queen Elizabeth II, Queen Elizabeth The Queen Mother, The Duke of Edinburgh, The Princess Royal and The Duchess of Gloucester.

== Racism controversy ==
In 2017, representatives of the National Congress of American Indians, who had previously been unaware of the tapestry project, issued statements to the effect that the final product was racist in its depiction of Native American people. "It shamelessly perpetuates a centuries-long artistic tradition that seeks to portray Native people as subhuman, warlike savages", according to Jacqueline Pata, the executive director of National Congress of American Indians.

"What I wanted to avoid was the picture of English people coming ashore from their galleon to the New World as peaceful and quiet. It wasn’t so," Mor told The Telegraph. "It's no use pretending about it or being shocked by it. Mine is a cartoon, but it is a reality. I tell it as it is and I tell it with humour."

== The Library ==
The New World Tapestry Library material includes histories of the years 1583–1642, much of it original research, files on the two hundred sixty four people named on the tapestry, plus heraldic information on over three hundred individuals, companies, towns, counties and universities.

== Supporters ==
Supporters of the New World Tapestry include the Adventurers for Virginia patrons of the New World Tapestry and Library. Their names are inscribed for posterity in the Adventurers for Virginia Record Book. Supporters who join the Adventurers for Virginia may also:

- In London, celebrate the Adventurers for Virginia Day every 10 April to commemorate the granting of royal charters by James II of England to the London Company and the Plymouth Adventurers (Plymouth Company) in 1606 to establish colonies in Virginia
- Help fund the production of the book, The Jamestown, Sagadahoc and Bermuda Story, for schools and researchers.
- Help fund the production of the Yeardley/Flowerdew Brasses for presentation in England and America.
- Help make grants to the British Empire & Commonwealth Museum at Bristol Temple Meads railway station in Bristol to create the permanent exhibition of the New World Tapestry, expand and enhance the New World Tapestry Library and help the development of three-way educational research between England, the Americas and Bermuda.
- Receive a tie showing the Adventurers' badge plus a lifetime pass to view the tapestry at the museum in Bristol.
