= British Empire and Commonwealth Museum =

Former museum in Bristol, England

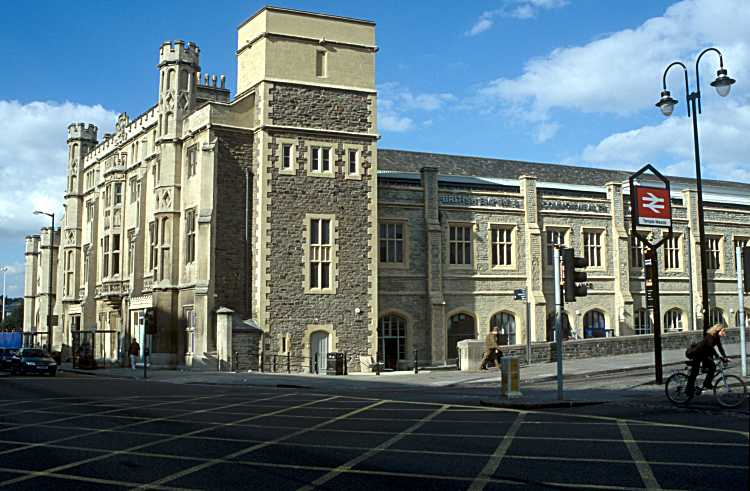

- Location within Bristol
- Established: 2002
- Dissolved: 2013
- Location: Bristol
- Coordinates: 51.4489°N 2.5835°W
- Director: Gareth Griffiths (former)

The British Empire and Commonwealth Museum (grid reference ST597725) was a museum in Bristol, England, exploring the history of the British Empire and the effect of British colonial rule on the rest of the world. The museum opened in 2002 and entered voluntary liquidation in 2013.

The museum opened in 2002 in Bristol's historic old railway station, designed by Isambard Kingdom Brunel, following renovation and conversion costing £8 million. It was completed in 1840 and includes the passenger shed and the adjoining former engine and carriage shed. It is over 220 ft long (67 m) with timber and iron roof spans of 72 ft (22 m), this Grade I listed building has been nominated as part of a World Heritage Site.

The museum had a publications department, producing books on aspects of colonial life such as the history of the Northern Rhodesia Police, and a register of titles of the regiments of the Honourable East India Company and East Indian Armies. The museum also held the collection of artefacts of the Commonwealth Institute; extensive photograph stills, paper, film and oral history archives, and a costume collection. These are now in the care of Bristol Museums, Galleries & Archives (apart from loans which were returned to their owners).

The museum also housed the New World Tapestry.

Unlike many national museums in Britain, the BECM was not publicly funded but was owned and operated by a charitable trust; consequently, an admission charge was required.

== Breaking the Chains ==
The museum's Breaking the Chains exhibition, funded by a £1m Heritage Lottery grant to mark the 200th anniversary of the abolition of the British Transatlantic Slave Trade by the Slave Trade Act 1807, was shortlisted for the Art Fund Prize.

== Closure and controversy ==
On 23 November 2007 the museum announced it would be moving its core operations to London in 2008. The museum closed to the public in the autumn of 2008 and for school visits at the end of March 2009.

On 16 March 2011, the Museums Association announced that the Director of the museum, Gareth Griffiths, had been dismissed pending a police investigation into the unauthorised disposal of museum objects.

By July 2012, the museum announced that the planned move to London had been cancelled and that it would instead give its collection to the City of Bristol to display at the Bristol City Museum and Art Gallery at a future date. The Old Station which had previously housed the museum was also given to the city, and may be used for future Network Rail services to London.

The unauthorised sale of hundreds of items from the museum's collection was the subject of a BBC One Inside Out programme on 10 December 2012.

In a letter dated 22 May 2013, the museum wrote to one of the lenders of items:

Following a further extensive search for the items, I can now confirm that, unfortunately, we have only been able to locate one of the ten [items]... It is a matter of great regret that the Museum cannot locate the remaining items and I apologise on behalf of the Museum's trustees for this. I also confirm that the Museum has now completed the transfer of the artefacts it held to the British Empire & Commonwealth Trust (held by Bristol City Council) and the Museum has now moved out of its premises and it is proposed that the company which operates the Museum will be wound down in the near future, with an intention to enter a Members Voluntary Liquidation in July 2013.

On 24 October 2013, The British Empire and Commonwealth Museum and The Empire Museum Ltd were placed into "members' voluntary liquidation"; two employees of PricewaterhouseCoopers, Bristol, were appointed joint liquidators.

=== "Lost" items ===
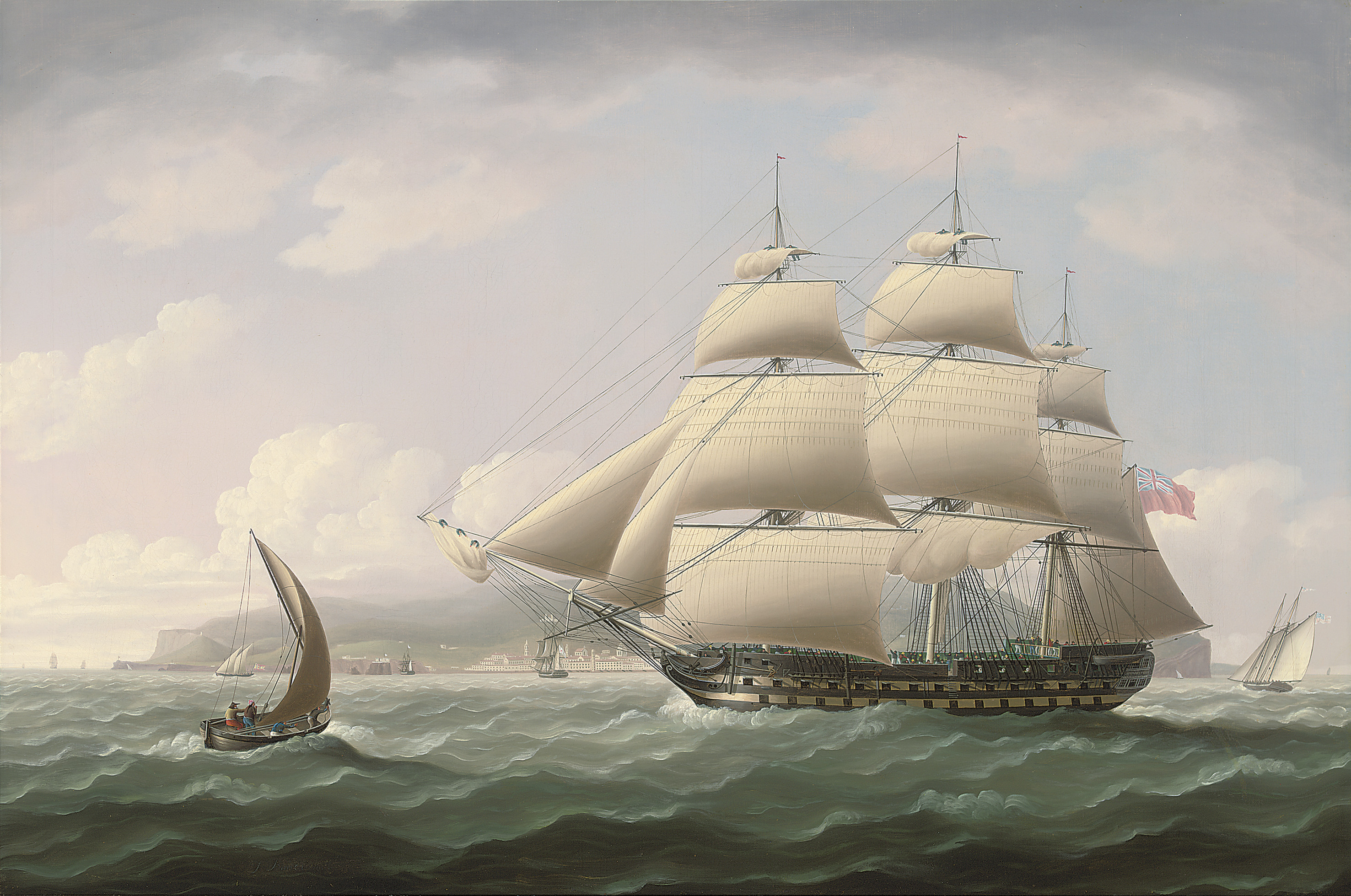
The Honourable East India Company's ship Dunira passing Funchal Bay on the Island of Madeira by Thomas Buttersworth

The following is a partial list.

- Thomas Buttersworth's painting of the East India Company's Dunira, loaned by Lord Caldecote, was sold at auction in 2008, to the Government of Madeira, without the owner's consent.
- Bronze statuette of John Robert Godley donated by New Zealand.
- Maori pare (carved lintel) donated by New Zealand.
- Model pataka (store house) donated by New Zealand.

== Collections ==
After the closure of the museum the collections were given to Bristol City Council to care for, with the objects under the care of Bristol Museum and Art Gallery and the archive collections (including papers, books, photographic, film and sound) under the care of Bristol Archives. The Directorate of Overseas Surveys photographic collection was deposited with the National Collection of Aerial Photography in Edinburgh in 2012. Since 2014 Bristol Archives have worked to catalogue some of the photographic and film collections, digitise them and make them available for public use.
