= Compton Castle =

Fortified manor house in Devon, England

Coordinates: 50°28′21″N 3°36′01″W

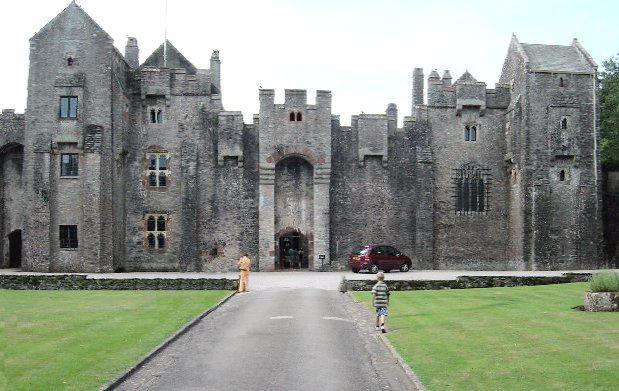
Compton Castle

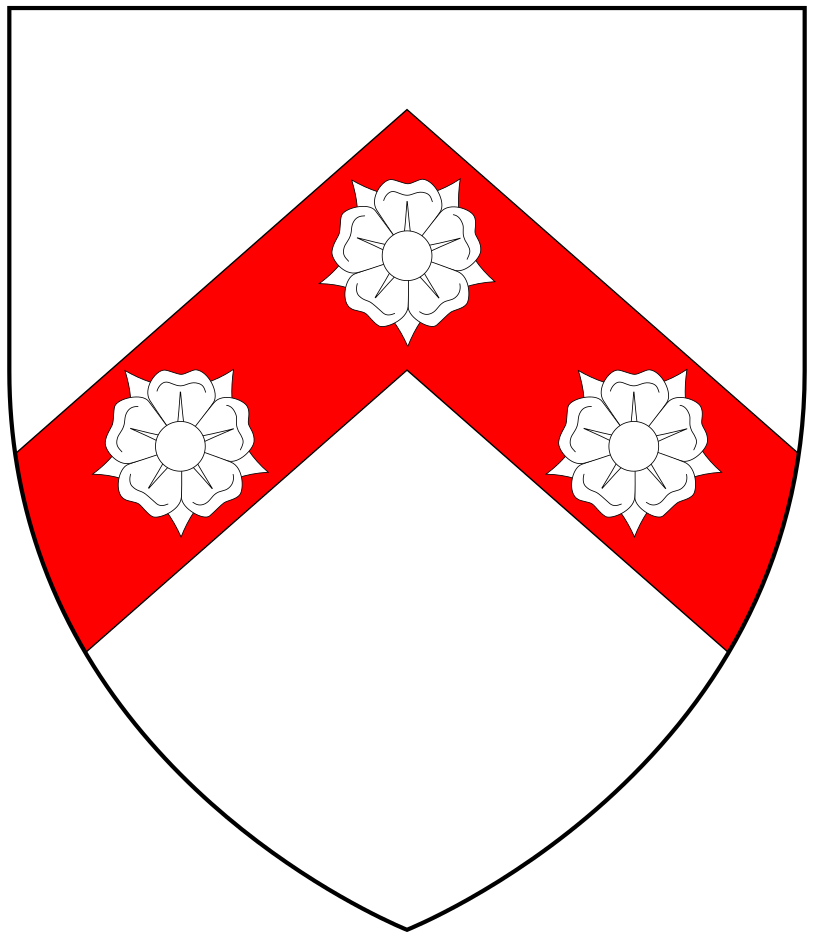
Arms of Gilbert: Argent, on a chevron gules three roses of the field

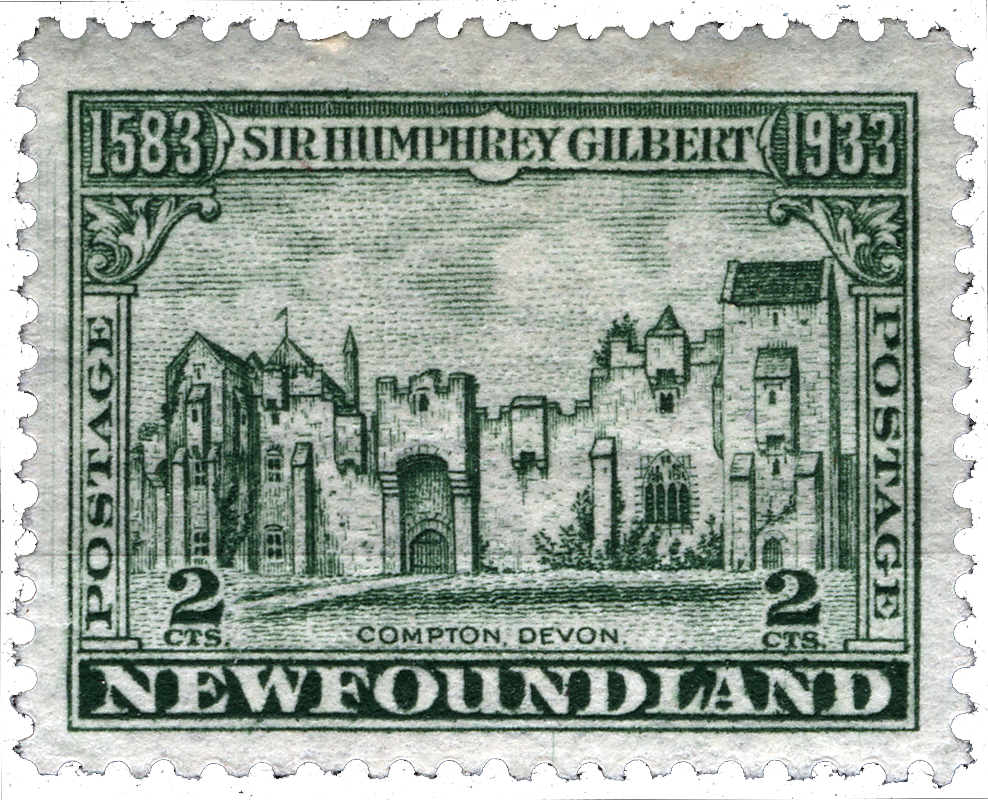
Compton Castle on Newfoundland Postage Stamp

Compton Castle in the parish of Marldon in Devon, is a fortified manor house in the village of Compton (formerly "Compton Pole"), about 5 miles (8 km) west of Torquay on the southern coast of Devon, England (grid reference SX865648). The estate was home to the families of Compton, de la Pole, Doddiscombe, Gilbert and Templer. The castle has been home to the Gilbert family for most of the time since it was built. Listed as a Grade 1 set of buildings, it has been a National Trust property since 1951.

== History ==
The castellated house was the seat of Sir Maurice de la Pole in the reign of Henry II (1154–1189), after which family the manor was known as Compton Pole when it came into the hands of Sir Peter Compton. The original undefended manor house was built in the mid-14th century and consisted of a hall flanked by solar and service rooms at each end. These were rebuilt in the later Middle Ages. The fortress-like front was added in about 1520 by John Gilbert. The central hall was in ruins by the 18th century, but was faithfully reconstructed in the 1950s.

Compton Castle's most famous inhabitant was Sir Humphrey Gilbert (1539–1583), coloniser of Newfoundland and half-brother of Sir Walter Raleigh; legend has it that Raleigh smoked the first pipe of tobacco in Britain while visiting Sir Humphrey. The castle was home to the Gilbert family until the estate was sold in 1785 whereupon it gradually declined until a descendant bought it back in 1931; he gave it to the National Trust in 1951 on the condition that members of the family should continue to occupy the castle. They still do, and administer it for the Trust.

== Modern history ==
The great hall lacked a roof and needed a great deal of restoration work which was all done prior to the National Trust acquiring the property. In the hall there is a model of Squirrel, the ship in which Sir Humphrey Gilbert sailed to Newfoundland (The crest of the Gilbert family is A squirrel sejant on a hill vert feeding on a crop of nuts proper). To the west of the great hall is the solar, which served as a private retiring room away from the bustle of the great hall. It is approached by a 15th-century staircase. Another restored room is the kitchen, which is housed in a separate building because of the risk of fire it posed. To the right of the hearth, a stone stair led up inside a tower to what was probably a guard room.

External defences in the castle included two portcullises which could be lowered when the castle came under attack. Arrows could be shot through loopholes overlooking the gateway. The curtain walls had slits through which stones and boiling oil could be dropped on any attackers trying to scale the walls.

The castle was used as a location for the filming of the 1995 version of Sense and Sensibility. Its Great Kitchen is notable for the insight it gives into medieval domestic life, and its small formal gardens are enclosed by a stone curtain wall.

There is another Compton Castle at Compton Pauncefoot, Somerset.
