= Bartholomew Gilbert =

Early 1600s mariner and explorer

- Died: 29 July 1603 (in Julian calendar)

Captain Bartholomew Gilbert was an English mariner who in 1602 served as co-captain on the first recorded European expedition to Cape Cod. His decisions resulted in that expedition's failure to establish a colony there.

== Early life and family ==
Some sources state that Bartholomew was of the London merchant class, while some assert he was part of the family Gilberts of Compton and assumed to be the son of explorer Humphrey Gilbert.

== Voyage to Cape Cod ==
Gilbert served aboard The Concord, a small bark which sailed out of Dartmouth, Devon, to establish a colony in New England, which was then known as Northern Virginia and was considered a part of the Colony of Virginia. The ship's captain was Bartholomew Gosnold, an experienced seaman who had sailed with Walter Raleigh and who was related to Gilbert on Gosnold's father's side.

The Concord had 32 men on board and sailed due west from the Azores to New England, arriving in May 1602 at Cape Elizabeth in Maine at the latitude 43 degrees and skirted the coastline for several days before anchoring in York Harbor, Maine, on 14 May 1602. The next day, they sailed into Provincetown Harbor and named it Cape Cod.

Following the coastline for several days, they discovered and touched at Martha's Vineyard, entered Buzzard's Bay, which they called Gosnold's Hope, and established a small post on Elizabeth's Island, which is now called Cuttyhunk Island and is part of the town of Gosnold. In nineteen days they built a fort and storehouse on an islet and began to trade with the Massachusett in furs, skins, and the sassafras plant. They sowed wheat, barley, and peas, and in fourteen days the young plants had sprung nine inches and more.

They planned to leave Gosnold and some of the crew to start a colony while Gilbert returned to Devon for more supplies. However, when it became known that Gilbert had provided insufficient provisions for the winter; their provisions, after division, would have lasted only six weeks. All hands decided to return to England with him. They made a very short voyage of five weeks and landed at Exmouth on 23 July. Their freight realised a great profit, the sassafras alone selling for £336 (equivalent to £91,057 in 2025) a ton.

A notable account of the voyage, written by John Brereton, one of the gentlemen adventurers, was published in 1602, and this helped in popularising subsequent voyages of exploration and colonisation of the northeast seaboard of North America. A second account by Gabriel Archer was not published until over 20 years later. Although the mission failed to establish a colony, the attempt is commemorated by the New World Tapestry and Gilbert is one of the people represented thereon.

== Voyage to Virginia ==
In July 1603, Gilbert returned to the Americas. Setting anchor in Chesapeake Bay, Gilbert and four crewmen went ashore to search for the missing members of the Roanoke Colony. They subsequently ran afoul of and were killed by a group of Algonquians on 29 July.

The date of this historic landing is represented in the Seal of Northampton County, Virginia. Not until 1607 did the English successfully establish Jamestown, Virginia, their first colony in what is now the United States.

== Bibliography ==
- Baigent, Elizabeth: John Brereton, in Oxford Dictionary of National Biography, 2004
- Gookin, Warner F. and Barbour, Phillip Bartholomew Gosnold, Discoverer and Planter, Hamden, CT: Archon, 1963
- Quinn, David B & Quinn, Alison M, The English New England Voyages 1602–1608, The Hakluyt Society Series II, Vol 161, 1983.
- Venn: Alumni Cantab, 1921
- Westby-Gibson, John: John Brereton, in Dictionary of National Biography, 1885
