= John Brereton =

English adventurer and chronicler

The Reverend John Brereton
- Born: c. 1571; East Anglia
- Died: c. 1632 (aged 60–61); East Anglia
- Other names: M. Iohn Brereton, Brierton
- Education: Gonville and Caius College, Cambridge; Norwich School
- Occupations: Adventurer, clergy, writer
- Known for: Exploration of Cape Cod
- Notable work: A Briefe Relation of the Description of Elizabeth's Ile, and some others towards the North Part of Virginie (1602)

John Brereton (b. c. 1571/1572 – d. c. 1632) was an English gentleman adventurer, clergyman, and chronicler of the 1602 voyage to the New World led by Bartholomew Gosnold.

Brereton recorded the first European exploration of Cape Cod and its environs. His account, published in 1602, helped promote the possibilities of English colonisation in what was then known as "the North part of Virginia" and would later become known as New England. Gosnold and his compatriots were the first Englishmen recorded as landing on this part of the North American coastline, now known as New England.

== Life ==
Twentieth century historians such as David Beers Quinn have identified Brereton as a clergyman who was born in East Anglia around 1571–72. He was the third son of Cuthbert Brereton, a merchant and Sheriff of Norwich, and Joan Brereton. His father's line, however, originated from outside East Anglia. Cuthbert was part of the Cheshire Brereton family and was great-nephew of both William Brereton (courtier) and Urian Brereton, a cousin of Sir William Brereton, 1st Baronet, and was also related to William Brereton, 1st Baron Brereton and his line.

Reverend John was educated at Norwich School, before being admitted to Gonville and Caius College, Cambridge aged seventeen on 17 January 1589. He graduated with a Bachelor of Arts degree in 1593, and proceeded to Master of Arts by seniority in 1596. He took holy orders, being ordained deacon priest by the Bishop of Norwich and in 1598 was appointed curate of Lawshall, Suffolk.

It is unknown how Brereton became friends with Gosnold, but it is likely they came into contact whilst studying at the University of Cambridge, although they were at different colleges. They may also have met through Brereton's appointment as rector in Suffolk, as Gosnold lived nearby. They were also in contact with the notable Elizabethan geographer and author, Richard Hakluyt, who had published numerous accounts of travels and voyages of discovery, especially in America.

With Gosnold, Brereton undertook a voyage to Virginia as it then was (now known as New England). Some of the people on that voyage never intended to settle in North America and it appears that Brereton was on the expedition after being asked by Gosnold to assist in navigating as well as to chronicle the undertaking. Also given his choice of career, he would have been able to provide spiritual and religious support to his fellow travellers. On his return to England and after the publication of his account, he appears to have lived a quiet life by becoming Rector of Brightwell, Suffolk, in 1619, and then Rector of St Peter Mancroft in Norwich. It is thought he died in 1632.

== The voyage and exploration of New England ==
Brereton joined Captain Bartholomew Gosnold, Bartholomew Gilbert, Gabriel Archer, and others to make the first English attempt to settle in the land since called New England. Twenty-four gentlemen and eight sailors left Falmouth in a small Dartmouth bark, the Concord, on 26 March 1602, twelve of the gentlemen intending to settle, while twelve others were to return home with the produce of the land and of their trading with the Native Americans. The voyage was permitted by Walter Raleigh, who had an exclusive crown grant of the whole coast.

Instead of making the circuitous route by the Canary Islands, Gosnold steered, as the winds permitted, due west, only southing towards the Azores, and was the first to accomplish a direct course to America, saving the better part of a thousand leagues. In May 1602 they arrived at Cape Elizabeth in Maine and skirted the coastline for several days before anchoring in York Harbor, Maine, on 14 May 1602. The next day, they sailed into Provincetown Harbor and named it Cape Cod. Here Gosnold, Brereton, and two others went ashore on the white sands, the first spot in New England ever trodden by English feet. They were astonished by the sheer number of fish (hence the cape being named Cape Cod) with large numbers of cod, herring, halibut, bass, and tuna as well as a large preponderance of whales. Doubling the Cape and passing Nantucket, they arrived at Martha's Vineyard. Gosnold named it after his deceased daughter, Martha, and the wild grapes that covered much of the land. In addition to the grapes, Brereton records the number and types of berries particularly blueberries, as well as mentioning the abundance of flora and fauna. Passing round Dover Cliff they entered Buzzard's Bay, which they called Gosnold's Hope, reached the island of Cuttyhunk, which they named Elizabeth's Island.

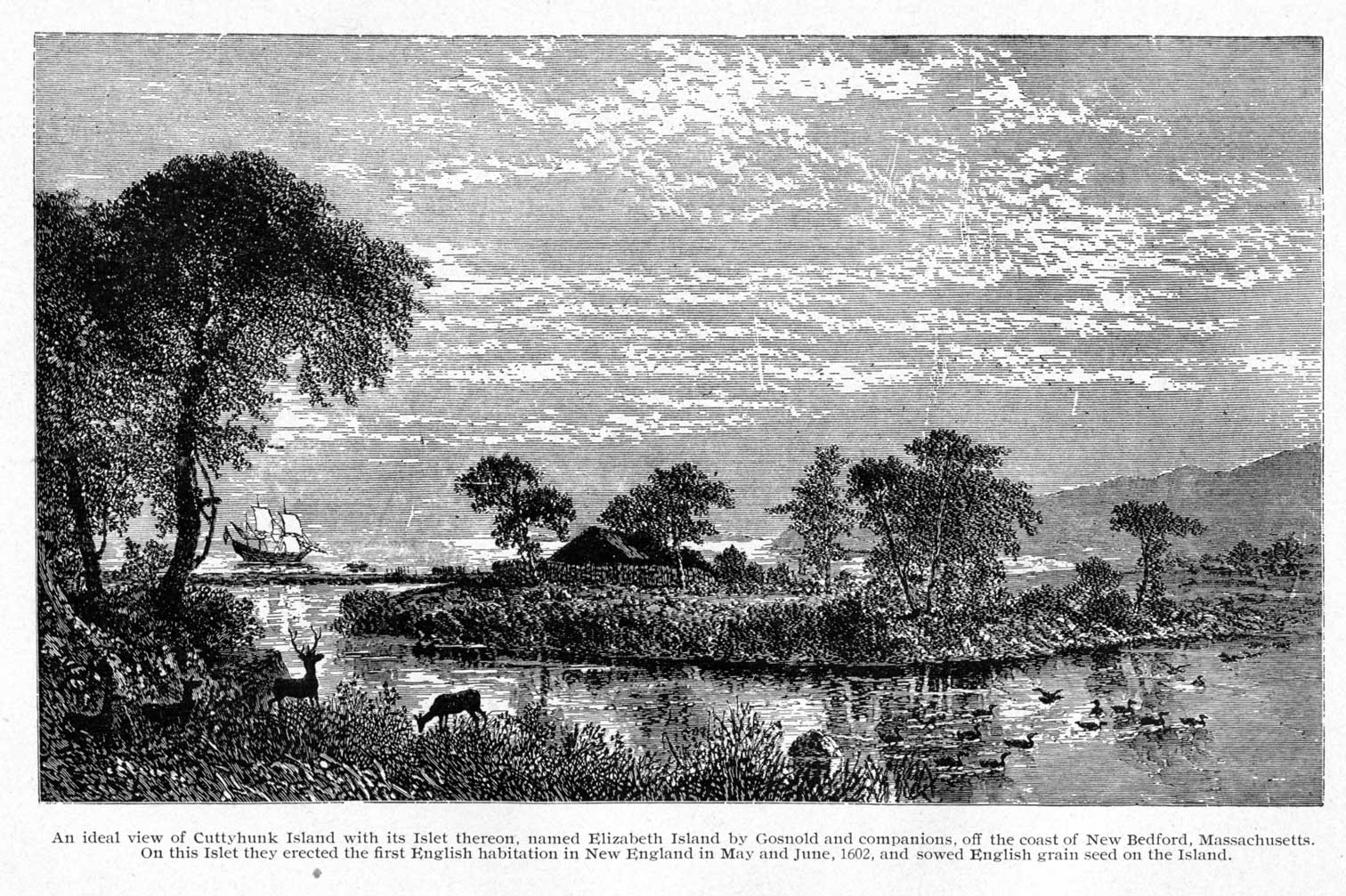
Expedition's fort on Elizabeth's Island

Here some of them thought about settling, so within three weeks they built a small fort on an island in the centre of a lake. They also traded with Native Americans in furs, tobacco, and trinkets. It had been agreed beforehand that some of the group would stay and form a colony whilst the others would return to England (some of whom would collect supplies for a return trip). After the fort was built, it was then decided that so small a company would be useless for colonisation; their provisions, after division, would have lasted only six weeks. The whole company therefore sailed for England, making a very short voyage of five weeks, landing at Exmouth on 23 July. Later further eastwards in Weymouth, Walter Raleigh met Gosnold, Gilbert and Brereton. Their cargo and freight realised a great profit, the bark and leaves of the sassafras alone selling for £336 a ton.

Although the mission failed to establish a colony, the attempt is commemorated in the New World Tapestry.

== The published account and Shakespeare Play ==
A briefe and true relation of the discouerie of the north part of Virginia

Brereton recorded the first European exploration of Cape Cod and its environs. His well-written and concise account, published in 1602, helped promote the possibilities of English colonisation in what was then known as “the North part of Virginia” and would later become known as New England. Brereton wrote A Briefe Relation of the Description of Elizabeth's Ile, and some others towards the North Part of Virginie which was published in London in 1602. A second impression was published the same year entitled A brief and true Relation of the Discovery of the North Part of Virginia. To this edition is added A Treatise of M. Edward Hayes, containing important inducements for the planting in these parts. Brereton also wrote to Walter Raleigh to give him a full account of the entire voyage and their findings.

Following the publication of his accounts, there were no fewer than twenty-three Atlantic crossings in nine separate voyages by one or two ships over the next six years. Captain John Smith, in his Adventures and Discourses, speaks of Master John Brereton and his account of his voyage impelled him to cast in his lot with Gosnold and Wingfield, and make that subsequent voyage which resulted in the planting and colonisation of Virginia in 1607.

William Shakespeare is said to have based his play "The Tempest" on Gosnold's 1602 voyage, with Prospero's island drawn from his descriptions of Martha's Vineyard. Interestingly Henry Wriothesley, 3rd Earl of Southampton was the primary benefactor of both Gosnold and Shakespeare.

== See also ==
- True Reportory

== Biography ==
- Baigent, Elizabeth: John Brereton, in Oxford Dictionary of National Biography, 2004
- Gookin, Warner F. and Barbour, Phillip Bartholomew Gosnold – Discoverer and Planter, Hamden, CT: Archon, 1963
- Quinn, David B & Quinn, Alison M, The English New England Voyages 1602–1608, The Hakluyt Society Series II, Vol 161, 1983.
- Venn: Alumni Cantab, 1921
- Gibson, J.W. (1886). "Brereton, John" . In Stephen, Leslie (ed.). Dictionary of National Biography. Vol. 06. London: Smith, Elder & Co. pp. 267–268.
