= Gilberts of Compton =

The Gilberts of Compton were a noted Anglo-Norman family of knightly class, having seats at both Compton Castle and Greenway Estate, Devon, England. They were prominent in the British colonization of the Americas during the Elizabethan era.

== Origin ==
The first well-documented member of the Gilbert family was Sir Geoffrey (Galfried) Gilbert MP for Totnes in 1326, who in 1329 married Joan de Compton, heiress of Compton Castle, thereby acquiring this seat for the family that came to be called the "Gilberts of Compton”. Their son William Gilbert expanded the fortunes of the family by marriage with Elizabeth Champernowne of Clist, eventual co-heiress of a wealthy Devonshire family.

== Notable Descendants ==
Little is known of the family's activities during the Middle Ages aside from Sir Otho Gilbert of Compton serving as High Sheriff of Devon from 1475 to 1476. It was descendants of this Otho Gilbert who would set out during the Elizabethan period on the family's “hereditary scheme of peopling America with Englishmen”. Most famous among these were the half brothers Sir Humphrey Gilbert and Sir Walter Raleigh, both famous explorers of the New World and perhaps infamous military figures in Ireland due to their military exploits there. Their lesser-known brother, Sir Adrian Gilbert of Compton, was nonetheless of the same cloth, having an especially savage military reputation in Ireland while also seeking a Northwest Passage to China under a patent from Queen Elizabeth I. Another brother, Sir John Gilbert, was Sheriff of Devon, knighted by Elizabeth I in 1571, and was Vice Admiral of Devon – responsible for defense against the Spanish Armada.

In the following generation, Bartholomew Gilbert named Cape Cod during his 1602 expedition to establish a colony in New England. He was killed by a group of Algonquians during a voyage the following year in search of the missing Roanoke Colony. In 1607, Sir Humphrey Gilbert's son, Raleigh Gilbert, established a fortified storehouse he called Fort Saint George on the coast of Maine. In the face of “nothing but extreme extremities”, this colony ultimately voted to return to England. It is said that they were so resolute in this goal that they built a ship to facilitate the return voyage, which would probably have been the first oceangoing vessel built in America.

Later, brothers Jonathan and John Gilbert would have a hand in establishing Hartford, Connecticut, acting as emissaries between the Governor in Hartford and the local indigenous tribes. Jonathan was a skilled linguist of local tribal languages and served as a militia leader. John's young son, another John Gilbert, was famously captured by Narragansett, Wampanoag and Nashaway/Nipmuc tribes led by Monoco after their attack on Lancaster, Massachusetts. In another unfortunate incident John's sister-in-law, Lydia Gilbert, was sentenced to death for witchcraft in Windsor, Connecticut, in 1654 during the infamous Connecticut Witch Trials. However Jonathan's younger son, Captain Thomas Gilbert, was said to have been “a brave and successful officer, and a leading man in the primitive navy of the colony”. Thomas commanded the twelve-gun ship Swan during King William's War, capturing the French ship Saint Jacob. He was captured in 1695, spending the rest of the war as a prisoner in France.

The Gilbert family continues to hold Compton Castle. Geoffrey Gilbert, a modern descendant, resides at Compton and administers the estate for the National Trust. His wife, Angela Gilbert, was appointed High Sheriff of Devon in 2016.
