= Bartholomew Gosnold =

English barrister, explorer, and privateer (1571–1607)

Captain Bartholomew Gosnold
- Coat of Arms of Bartholomew Gosnold
- Born: 1571; Grundisburgh, Suffolk, England
- Died: 22 August 1607 (aged 35–36); Jamestown, Colony of Virginia
- Other name: Gosnoll
- Occupations: Lawyer, explorer and privateer
- Known for: Founder of the Virginia Company of London
- Spouse: Mary Goldinge
- Children: 7
- Parent(s): Anthony Gosnold and Dorothy Bacon
- Relatives: Richard Pepys (son-in-law)

Bartholomew Gosnold (b. 1571 – d. 1607) was an English barrister, explorer and privateer who was instrumental in founding the Virginia Company in London and Jamestown in colonial America. He led the first recorded European expedition to Cape Cod. He is considered by Preservation Virginia (formerly known as the Association for the Preservation of Virginia Antiquities) to be the "prime mover of the colonization of Virginia".

== Early life and family ==
Gosnold was born in Grundisburgh in Suffolk, England, in 1571, (Note: This year is deduced from the year that Gosnold matriculated at Jesus College in Cambridge, 1587, together with mentions of him in the wills of his great-grandfather and his widow although the Cambridge records of him list his birth year as 1569.) and his family seat was at Otley Hall, Otley, Suffolk. His parents were Anthony Gosnold of Grundisburgh and Dorothy Bacon of Hessett. Henry Gosnold, the judge and friend of Francis Bacon, was his cousin. (Note: Gosnold himself was distantly related to both Francis Bacon and his father, the Lord Keeper of the Great Seal under Elizabeth. Bartholomew's mother, Dorothy Bacon, was granddaughter of Thomas Bacon of Hessert. That there was a close relationship with the more famous Bacons is shown by the fact that Sir Nicholas Bacon served as overseer of the wills of both Dorothy Bacon's grandfather and uncle.) Bartholomew had a younger brother Anthony, born sometime between 1573 and 1578, who accompanied him to Virginia as well as a cousin also named Anthony Gosnold who was still living in Virginia in 1615. In 1578, the will of Bartholomew's great-grandmother Ann Gosnold shows five sisters (Elizabeth, Margaret, Dorothy, Anne, and Mary) of Bartholomew and Anthony.

Gosnold graduated from Jesus College at the University of Cambridge and studied law at the Middle Temple. It was probably at Cambridge that he met John Brereton, a friend who accompanied him on his 1602 voyage to New England, becoming the first Englishmen to land on that coastline. He was also a friend of Richard Hakluyt and sailed with Walter Raleigh. He married Mary Goldinge, daughter of Robert Goldinge of Bury St Edmunds and his wife Martha Judd, at Latton, Essex, in 1595. Mary's mother, Martha, was daughter of Sir Andrew Judd a wealthy London merchant who, among other offices, was Lord Mayor of London, 1550–51. More importantly for Gosnold's story, Sir Andrew Judd was also grandfather to Thomas Smith, one of the founders of the Virginia Company. "Bartholomew's marriage, which has the appearance of one arranged with foresight, brought together a young man of high standing among the landed gentry and a young lady whose antecedents were found chiefly among the wealthier merchants of the city of London." Together, Bartholomew and Mary Gosnold had seven children, six of whom were baptized at Bury St Edmunds, Suffolk, between 1597 and 1607:

- Martha (baptised 24 April 1597-1598)
- Mary (1599-1660) married Richard Pepys, great-uncle of the diarist Samuel Pepys.
- Robert Gosnold (baptised Oct 1600 - 1681) married Trephena Bateman in Kettlebaston, Suffolk in 1627
- Susan Gosnold (baptised 2 August, 1602)
- Bartholomew Gosnold (baptised 16 December, 1603)
- Francisca Gosnold (buried 17 July, 1604)
- Paul Gosnold (baptised 11 December, 1605) Royalist clergyman ejected from Church of St Clare, Bradfield in 1643
- Martha Gosnold (baptised 5 February 1607) married John Blemell 20 Aug 1633 in Horningsheath, Suffolk

== Early maritime career ==
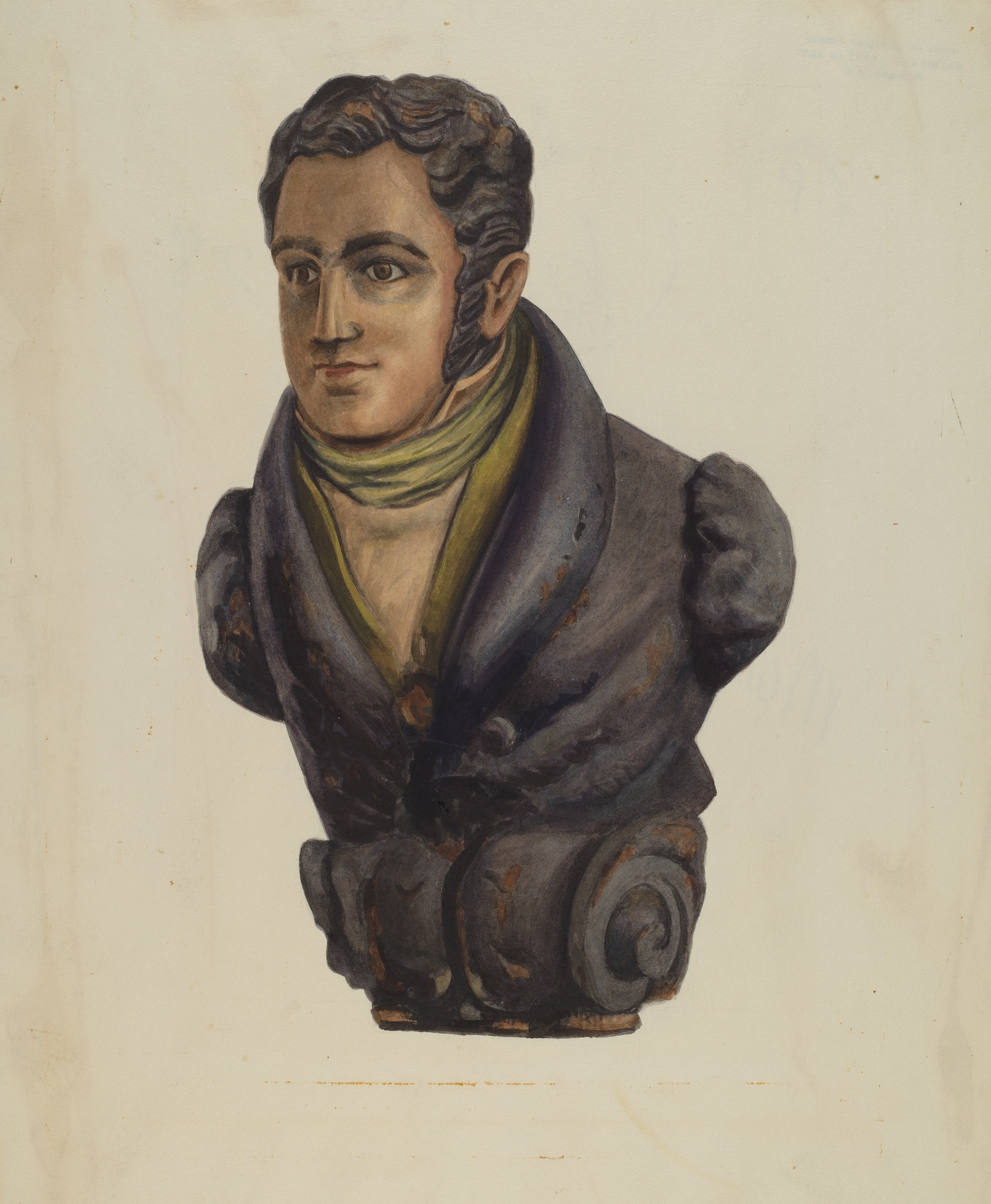
Figurehead from the 1800s ship, Bartholomew Gosnold

There is no record of Gosnold's early maritime experiences. But, given that he was entrusted with a ship to attempt a colonizing project in southern New England in 1602, he must have had significant experience. His biographer has suggested, based on circumstantial evidence that in 1597–98 he served under the Earl of Essex on his Azores voyages. Many of those involved in that voyage afterwards became involved in the colonization of Virginia.

== Organizing a colonial enterprise ==
Gosnold early became a principal proponent of English New World settlement.

In the Elizabethan (and later Stuart) ages, exploration and colonization was a private endeavor. While the crown did not defray any of the expenses of these enterprises, it granted monopolies to an individual or corporation to exploit a particular area that the crown claimed. This made the efforts profit-driven, much like privateering. So a would-be colonizer, like Gosnold, had to raise the capital for the expedition among private sources. As these ventures became more common great corporations would arise, much like the corporations which exploited the trading routes (which the crown also granted monopolies on). Substantial obstacles stood in the way of organizing a commercial colonizing venture to the New World. In the first place, Ireland beckoned as an alternate prospect for colonization, one that was less expensive, at least with respect to shipping expenses. Most of the venture capitalists who were considering New World ventures were also involved in Irish ventures. Thomas Smith's son, for example, was involved in the first substantial effort to colonize Ulster (although he was killed early in the endeavour). There was also the substantial financial risk involved in colonizing projects. Sir Walter Raleigh had lost 40 thousand pounds in founding Roanoke Colony, and he pledged still more to attempt to find and rescue the lost settlers.

There was, however, a new colonial plan that seemed to have garnered general acceptance since it was written in the mid-1590s. It was in the report written by Edward Hayes to Lord Burghley setting forth the rationale and procedure for settlement. The argument was that colonization efforts should begin in northern Virginia (New England) because compared with the locations tried in the lower latitudes the area's climate better comported with English comfort and produced agriculture much like England's. The coast of New England also produced a wealth of fish prized in Europe which could support a small foothold establishment and produce a profit with growth provided when more settlers were gradually added later.

== Expedition to Cape Cod and environs ==
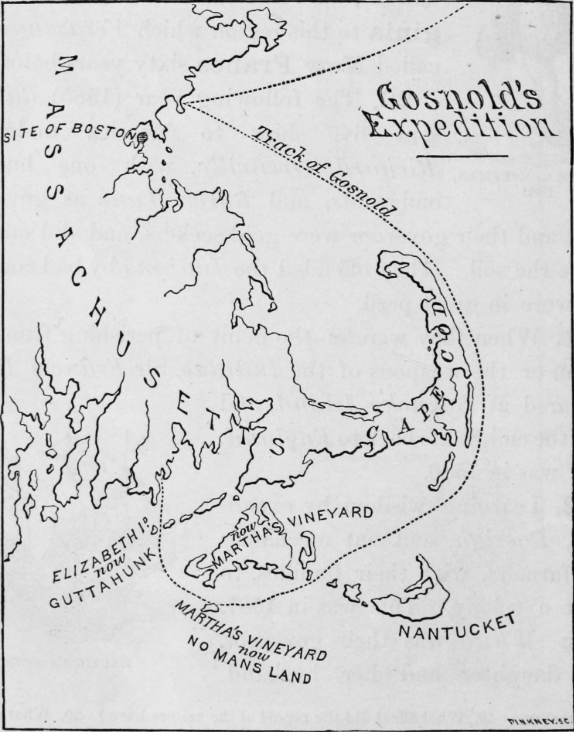
Bartholomew Gosnold's exploration of Cape Cod, 1602

English plans to colonize New England began to take concrete form in the early to mid-1590s when Edward Hayes wrote a treatise to Lord Burghley setting forth the rationale and procedure for settlement. (Note: Whether the ideas were Hayes's own or Burghley's which Hayes merely justified by the report, a settlement in southern New England comported with Burghley's foreign policy objective. Hayes argued that the area's climate better comported with English comfort and produced agriculture much like England's. The area also produced a wealth of fish prized in Europe which could support a small foothold establishment with more settlers to be added later.) The first expedition to set out from England to southern New England was fully in accord with Hayes's principles.

Captain Gosnold obtained backing to attempt to found an English colony in the New World and in 1602 he sailed from Falmouth, Cornwall, in a small Dartmouth bark, the Concord, with thirty-two on board. These included a friend of his, John Brereton, whom he possibly knew from his days at University of Cambridge, as well as Bartholomew Gilbert and Gabriel Archer. They intended to establish a colony in New England. Gosnold pioneered a direct sailing route due west from the Azores to what later became New England, arriving in May 1602 at Cape Elizabeth in Maine (Lat. 43 degrees).

On 14 May 1602, Gosnold made landfall off the southern coast of Maine with the purpose of setting up a small fishing outpost of 20 of the crew who would stay the winter. They were there hailed by a "Biscay shallop" containing eight men, who the English discovered were not "Christians" as they had supposed but "savages" of "swart" colour who had many European accoutrements and acted boldly among the English. (Note: Gabriel Archer's description expresses the surprise the English experienced in finding Natives so thoroughly influenced by Europeans (probably French fishermen). He remarked on the breeches, stocking, shoes and hat "made by some Christian" but worn by one of them as well as how "boldly" they boarded the Concord. They could also speak "divers Christian words" and with chalk described the coast thereabout.)

The next day, on 15 May 1602, he sailed into Provincetown Harbor, where he is credited with naming Cape Cod for the abundant fish. The captain explored the land and found a young Native boy wearing copper ear decorations with an apparent willingness to help the Englishman. Continuing down the Atlantic coast of Cape Cod, pivoting on Gilbert's Point, they coasted westward observing numerous Natives on shore, many running after them to gaze.

Following the coastline for several days, he discovered Martha's Vineyard which they explored but found seemingly uninhabited. Gosnold named it after his deceased daughter, Martha, and the wild grapes that covered much of the land.

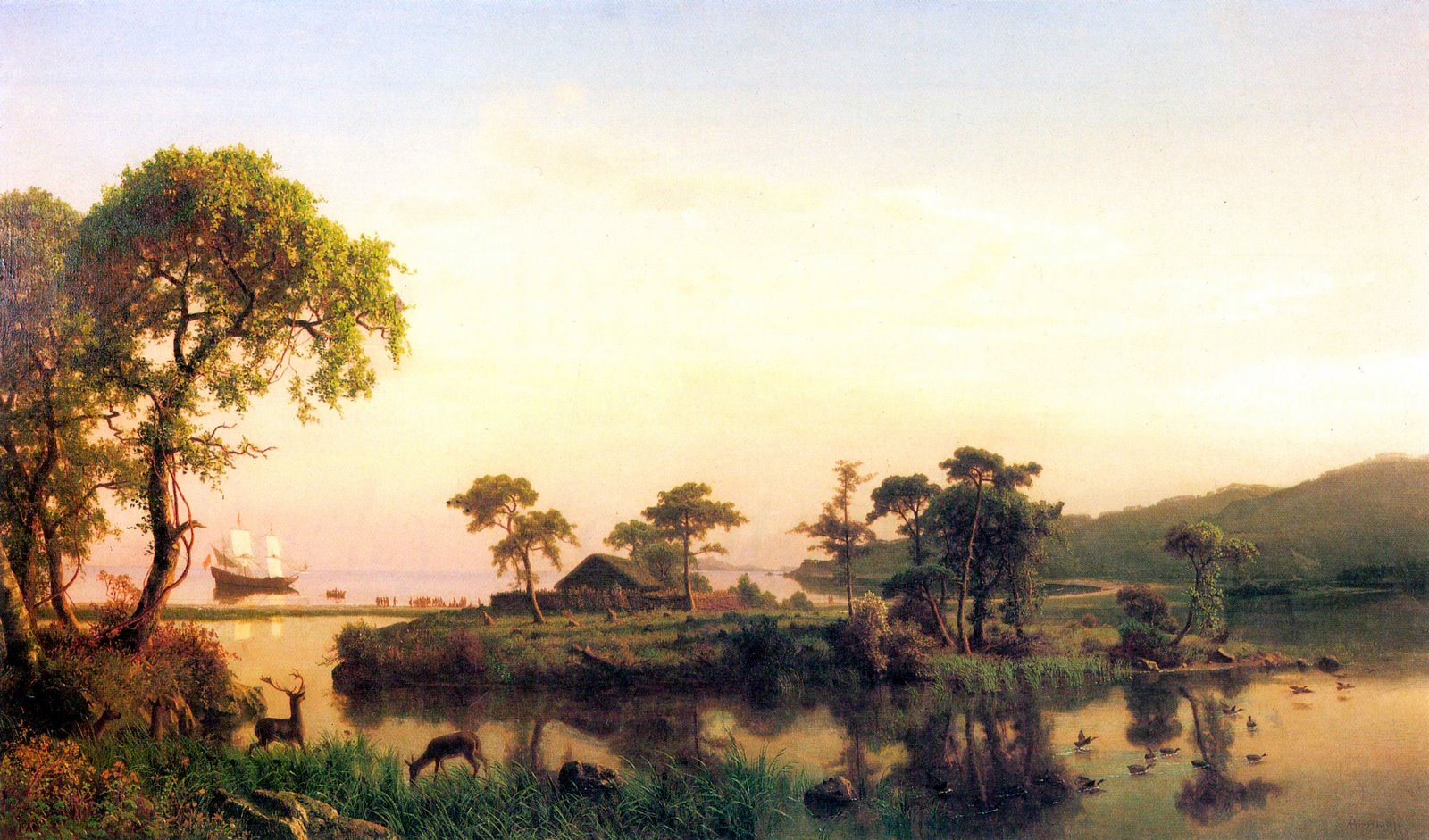
Gosnold at Cuttyhunk, 1602 by Albert Bierstadt. Oil on canvas, 1858. New Bedford Whaling Museum.

From there they sailed about the various islands now called Elizabeth until they came upon Cuttyhunk Island (which they called Elizabeth Island), where on 20 May they determined to establish the proposed settlement on the western part of the island. They selected the island in the middle of a large freshwater lake in the south of the island for which they made a flat-bottomed boat to transport from the island to larger island that encompassed it. Each time they encountered Natives, whether on their coasting expeditions or Gosnold's separate explorations while the others were building the fort, such as his visit to the mainland on 31 May, (Note: On 31 May 1602 o.s. Gosnold sailed the Concord toward Hap's Hill, which is now Round Hill near Dumplin Rocks in Dartmouth, and came ashore. He was greeted by men, women and children willing to offer him "skinnes of wilde beasts, which may be rich Furres, Tobacco, Hempe, artificial Strings coloured, Chaines," and so forth.) the Natives showed themselves ready to trade. Indeed, their metal ornaments and their supply of furs to offer show that they had already become acculturated to European ways and they were willing to accommodate. It became, from the Natives' point of view, the ritual that bonded the two cultures.

Gosnold's men were interested, however, with the trade that would enrich them and their commercial underwriters in Europe so spent more time tending to the harvesting of sassafras root and cedar wood than daily encounters with the Natives. In fact, they made a conscious effort to prevent the Natives from finding out the location of their fort. It is unclear how the situation developed but by 11 June the relations had become so strained that a party of two Englishmen out hunting for shellfish for food were set upon by four Natives who shot one in the side with an arrow. Shortly thereafter, a dispute arose between those settlers who were supposed to remain and those who were returning to England, which resulted in the decision to end the settlement project. The post was abandoned when settlers decided to return on the ship to England since they feared they had insufficient provisions to carry them through the winter. All of the settlers embarked on the return voyage on 17 June.

Over the next decade settlers would involve themselves in a series of increasingly hostile encounters, and by the time of the Mayflower landing the amiable helpfulness that Gosnold first discovered among all the Ninnimissinuok had become open hostility.

== Virginia Company, Jamestown ==
Gosnold spent several years after his return to England promoting a more ambitious attempt; he obtained from King James I an exclusive charter for a Virginia Company to settle Virginia. To form the core of what would become the Virginia Colony at Jamestown, he recruited his brother Anthony, a cousin, his cousin-by-marriage Edward Maria Wingfield, as well as John Smith, in addition to members of his 1602 expedition. Gosnold himself served as vice-admiral of the expedition, and captain of the Godspeed (one of the three ships of the expedition; the other two being the Susan Constant, under Captain Christopher Newport, and the Discovery, under Captain John Ratcliffe).

Gosnold also solicited the support of Matthew Scrivener, cousin of Edward Maria Wingfield. Scrivener became Acting Governor of the new Colony, but drowned in an accident in 1609 along with Anthony Gosnold, Bartholomew's brother, while trying to cross to Hog Island in a storm. (Scrivener's brother Nicholas had also drowned while a student at Eton College).

Gosnold was popular among the colonists and opposed the location of the colony at Jamestown Island due to what he perceived as its unhealthy location; he also helped design the fort that held the initial colony. He died only four months after they landed, on 22 August 1607. George Percy's 'Discourse' that was printed in the fourth volume of Purchas His Pilgrimes (1625) records Gosnold's death "... Captain Bartholomew Gosnold one of Councile, he was buryed thereupon having all the ordinance in the Fourt shote offwith manye vollyes of small shot ..."

== Discovery of Gosnold's possible grave ==
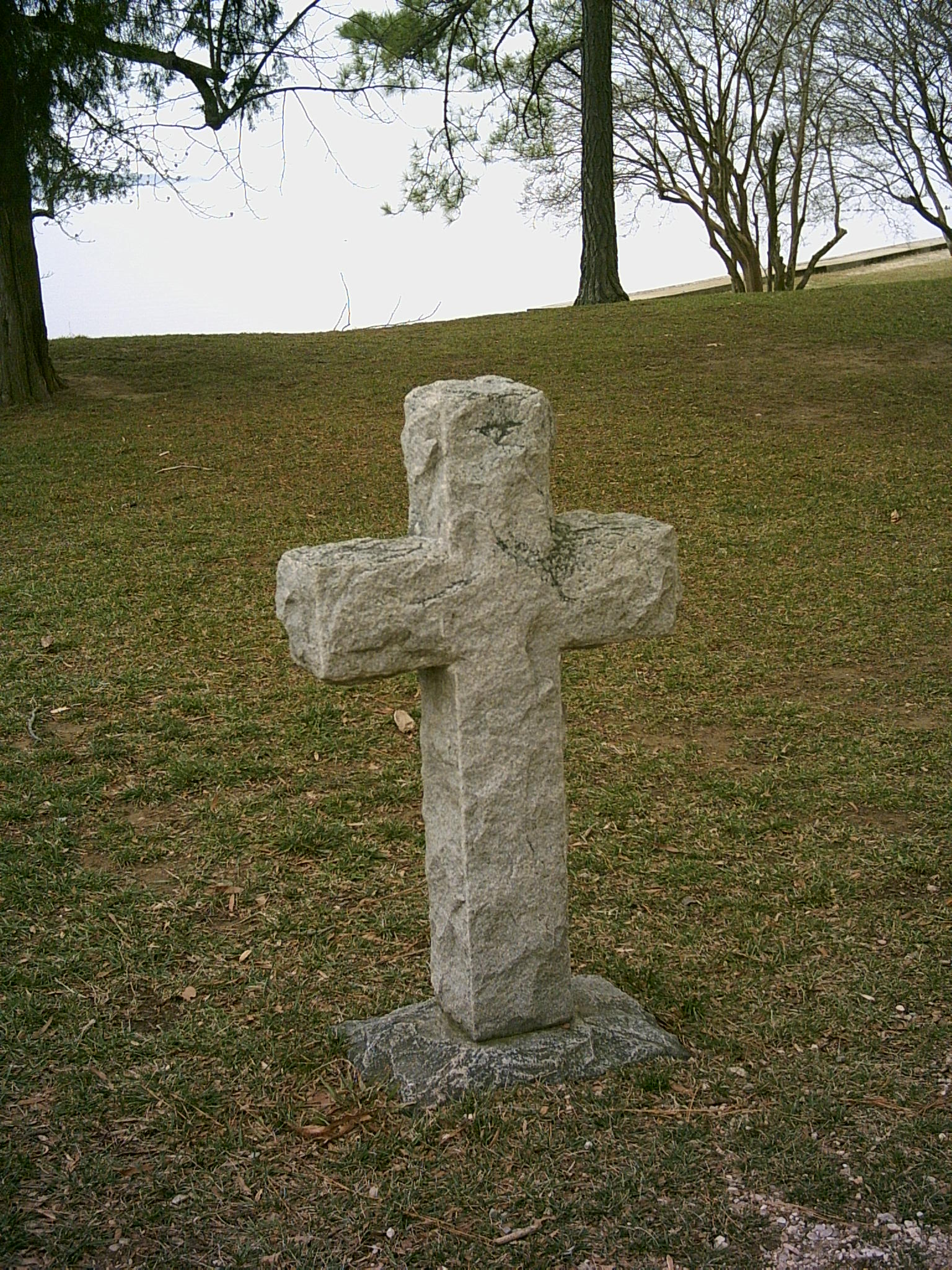
Stone cross marking what is believed to be the gravesite of Bartholomew Gosnold

In 2003 Preservation Virginia announced that its archaeological dig at Jamestown had discovered the likely location of Gosnold's grave. It was also believed that he was buried outside the James day fort. A skeleton the dig found is currently on display at the Voorhees Archaearium at Historic Jamestown. Preservation Virginia began genetic fingerprinting, hoping to verify Gosnold's identity in time for the Jamestown quadricentennial. By June 2005 researchers and The Discovery Channel sought permission to take DNA samples from the remains of his sister, Elizabeth Tilney, buried in the Church of All Saints, Shelley, Suffolk, and they were granted the first faculty for such a purpose by the English Diocese of St Edmundsbury and Ipswich. They found and removed some bone fragments from the church, but they could not identify Tilney's remains and so they were not able to conclude anything from their analysis. In November 2005 Preservation Virginia announced that it had no reason to doubt that Tilney's remains were somewhere under the church floor, but its DNA testing had not confirmed a relationship.

== Notes, references and sources ==
=== Sources ===
- Arber, Edward, ed. (1910). Travels and Works of Captain John Smith. Edinburgh: John Grant. Hosted online by the Internet Archive: Volume I and Volume II.
- Archer, Gabriel (1843). "The Relation of Captain Gosnold's Voyage to the North part of Virginia, begun the sixth-and twentieth of March, Anno 42 Elizabethae Reginae, 1602, and delivered by Gabriel Archer, a gentleman in the said voyage". Collections of the Massachusetts Historical Society. 3. 8: 72–81. The book is also contained in Purchas 1625, pp. IV:1647–51.
- Beaven, Alfred B. (1908). The Aldermen of the City of London, Temp. Henry III.-1908. London: Eden Fisher & Co. for the Corporation of the City of London.
- Brereton, John (1602). A Brief and true Relation of the Discoverie of the North Part of Virginia ... London: Georg. Bishop. A facsimile reprint with introduction by Luther S. Livingston and published by Dodd, Mead & Co. in 1903 is hosted by the Internet Archive. A digitized version (with page numbers) is also hosted by the University of Michigan. An annotated version can also be found in Burrage 1906, pp. 353–94.
- Brown, Alexander (1897). Genesis of the United States. Vol. 1. Boston: Houghton, Mifflin and Co.
- Burrage, Henry S., ed. (1906). Early English and French voyages, chiefly from Hakluyt, 1534–1608. New York: Charles Scribner's Sons.
- Gookin, Warner F. (July 1949a). "Notes on the Gosnold Family". The Virginia Magazine of History and Biography. 57 (3): 307–315. JSTOR 4245639.
- Gookin, Warner F. (July 1949b). "Who was Bartholomew Gosnold?". The William and Mary Quarterly. 6 (3): 398–415. doi:10.2307/1919984. JSTOR 1919984.
- Gookin, Warner F. (April 1950). "The First Leaders at Jamestown". The Virginia Magazine of History and Biography. 58 (2): 181–93. JSTOR 4245691.
- Gookin, Warner F. (1963). Bartholomew Gosnold, Discoverer and Planter: New England—1602, Virginia—1607. Hamden, Connecticut: Archon Books of the Shoe String Press. LCCN 62019990/L.
- Knapp, Samuel L. (1836). The Library of American History. New York: C.J. Jackson & Co.
- Levermore, Charles Herbert, ed. (1912). Forerunners and Competitors of the Pilgrims and Puritans: or, Narratives of Voyages Made by Persons Other than the Pilgrims and Puritans of the Bay Colony to the Shores of New England during the First Quarter of the Seventeenth Century, 1601–1625, with Especial Reference to the Labors of Captain John Smith in Behalf of the Settlement of New England. Brooklyn, New York: The Society. LCCN a17000511.
- Purchas, Samuel, ed. (1625). Hakluytus posthumus, or, Purchas his Pilgrimes. Contayning a history of the world, in sea voyages, & lande-travells, by Englishmen and others ... London: Imprinted for H. Fetherston. The original imprint was "In fower parts, each containing five bookes." All four volumes are hosted online by the Library of Congress. The 1905–07 facsimile reproduction (Glasgow: J. MacLehose and sons), in 20 volumes (one for each of the "bookes") is hosted online by HathiTrust.
- Quinn, D.B. (1960). "Edward Hayes, Liverpool Colonial Pioneer" (PDF). Transactions of the Historic Society of Lancashire and Cheshire. 111: 25–45. Archived from the original (PDF) on 21 December 2016.
- Quinn, David B. (April 1970). "Thomas Hariot and the Virginia Voyages of 1602". The William and Mary Quarterly. 27 (2): 268–281. doi:10.2307/1918653. JSTOR 1918653.
- Salisbury, Neal (1982). Manitou and Providence: Indians, Europeans, and the Making of New England, 1500–1643. New York: Oxford University Press. ISBN 0195034546.
- Smith, John (1907). The generall historie of Virginia, New England & the Summer Isles: together with The true travels, adventures and observations, and A sea grammar. New York: Macmillan. First published in London in 1624. The Macmillan version, a facsimile printing of the first edition, is hosted by the Library of Congress in two volumes: Volume I and Volume II. A searchable version (with various download options) of the same book is hosted by the Internet Archive: Volume I and Volume II.
