= Tet Offensive =

1968 Vietnam War military campaign

Tet Offensive Sự kiện Tết Mậu Thân
- Part of the Vietnam War
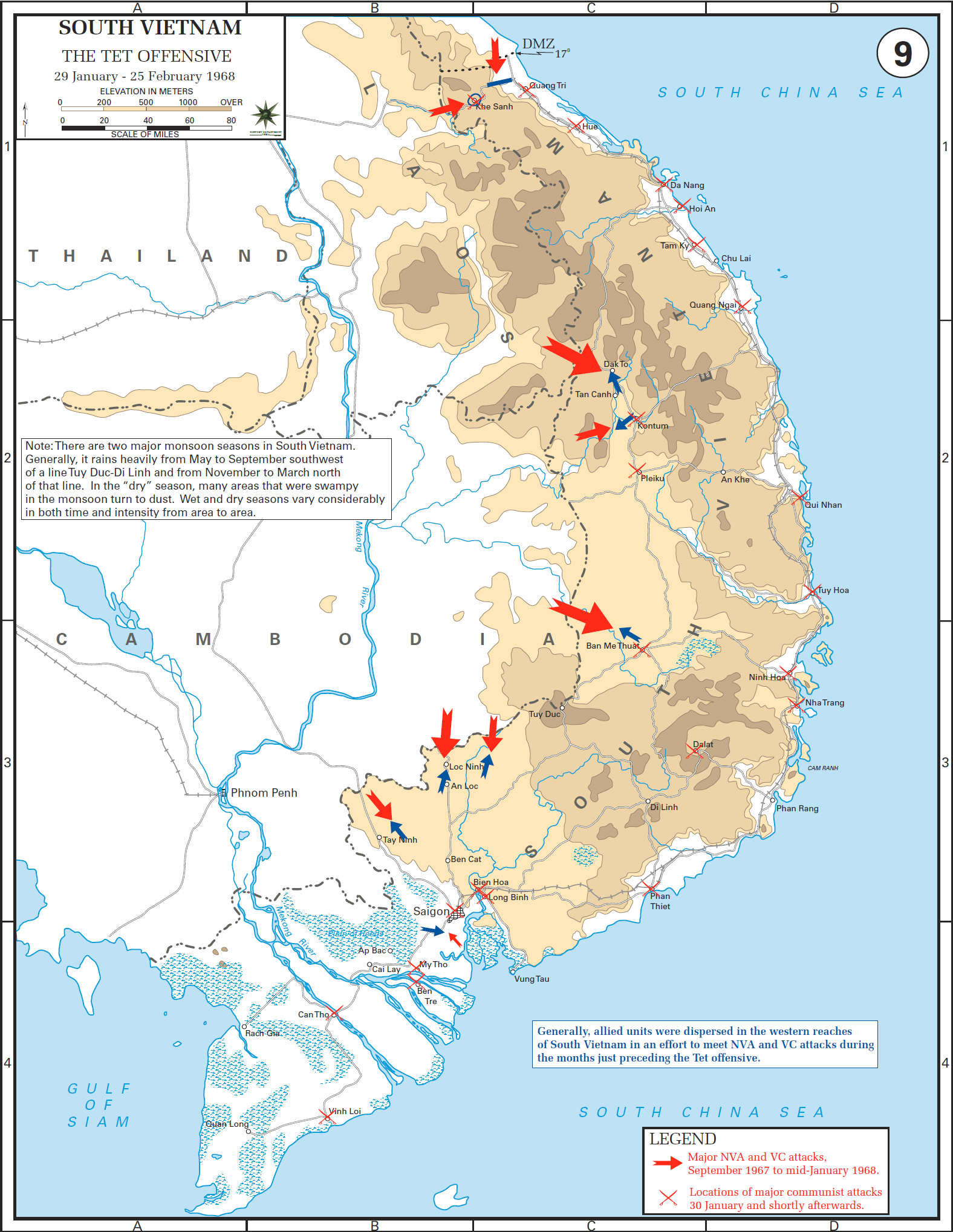
- Map indicating towns and cities in which significant fighting occurred during the Tet Offensive of 1968
Date	Phase 1: 30 January – 20 March 1968 (2 months); Phase 2: 5 May – 15 June 1968 (1 month, 1 week and 3 days); Phase 3: 9 August – 23 September 1968 (1 month and 2 weeks)
Location	South Vietnam 11°N 107°E
Result	U.S. – South Vietnamese victory

Belligerents
South Vietnam; United States; South Korea; Australia; New Zealand; Thailand: Kingdom of Laos	North Vietnam (Provisional Revolutionary Government of the Republic of South Vietnam) Viet Cong

Commanders and leaders
(South Vietnam) Nguyễn Văn Thiệu (South Vietnam) Nguyễn Cao Kỳ (South Vietnam) Cao Văn Viên; Đỗ Cao Trí; Lê Nguyên Khang; Hoàng Xuân Lãm (United States) Lyndon B. Johnson (United States) Robert McNamara (United States) Clark Clifford (United States) William Westmoreland	(North Vietnam) Lê Duẩn (North Vietnam) Lê Đức Thọ; Võ Nguyên Giáp (North Vietnam) Văn Tiến Dũng (Provisional Revolutionary Government of the Republic of South Vietnam) Hoàng Văn Thái (Provisional Revolutionary Government of the Republic of South Vietnam) Trần Văn Trà; Lê Đức Anh; Phạm Hùng

Strength
~1,300,000	Phase 1: ~80,000; Total: ~323,000 – 595,000

Casualties and losses
In Phase One: South Vietnam: 4,954 killed 15,917 wounded 926 missing (United States) (Third Republic of Korea) (Australia) (New Zealand) (Thailand); Others: 4,124 killed 19,295 wounded 604 missing Total casualties in Phase One: 45,820 casualties: 9,078 killed; 35,212 wounded; 1,530 missing 123 aircraft destroyed, 214 heavily damaged and 215 medium damaged; In Phase Two: (United States) 2,169 killed, unknown wounded (South Vietnam) 2,054 killed, unknown wounded Total for 3 phases: Unknown	In Phase One: RVN/U.S. claimed: 45,000+ killed; 5,800 captured; One PAVN source (Saigon only): 5,000+ killed; 10,000 wounded; 7,000 captured; Phase One, Phase Two and Phase Three: PAVN source (total for 3 phases): 111,179 casualties: 45,267 killed; 61,267 wounded; 5,070 missing
- Civilian: 14,300 killed, 24,000 wounded, and 630,000 refugees

The Tet Offensive (Note: Vietnamese: Sự kiện Tết Mậu Thân, lit. "Yang-Earth-Monkey Tet upheaval"; officially called Tổng tiến công và nổi dậy Tết Mậu Thân, "General offensive and uprising of Tet Mau Than" by the communist forces. The Vietnamese name Mậu Thân derives from the sexagenary cycle, a traditional system of naming years in which 1968 was the year of Yang-Earth (Mậu) Monkey (Thân).) was both a major escalation and one of the largest military campaigns of the Vietnam War. The North Vietnamese People's Army of Vietnam (PAVN) and the Viet Cong (VC) launched a surprise attack on 30 and 31 January 1968 against the forces of the South Vietnamese Army of the Republic of Vietnam (ARVN), the United States Armed Forces and their allies, targeting military and civilian command and control centers throughout South Vietnam. The name is the truncated version of the Lunar New Year festival name in Vietnamese, Tết Nguyên Đán, a holiday period when most ARVN personnel were on leave. The North Vietnamese Politburo and leader Lê Duẩn intended to trigger political instability and hoped that mass armed assaults on urban centers would trigger defections and uprisings.

The offensive was launched prematurely in the early morning hours of 30 January in large parts of the I and II Corps Tactical Zones of South Vietnam. This allowed allied forces some time to prepare defensive measures. When the main operation began during the early morning of 31 January, the offensive was countrywide; 77,000 PAVN/VC troops struck more than 100 towns and cities, including 36 of 44 provincial capitals, 5 of 6 autonomous cities, 72 of 245 district towns, and the capital Saigon. It was the largest military operation conducted by either side to that point in the war.

Hanoi launched the offensive in the belief it would trigger a popular uprising leading to the collapse of the South Vietnamese government. Although the initial attacks stunned the allies and they lost control of several cities temporarily, they quickly regrouped, repelled the attacks, and inflicted heavy casualties on PAVN/VC forces. The popular uprising anticipated by Hanoi never materialized. During the Battle of Huế, intense fighting lasted for a month, resulting in the destruction of the city. During its occupation, PAVN/VC forces executed thousands of people in the Massacre at Huế. Around the American combat base at Khe Sanh, fighting continued for two more months.

The offensive was a military defeat for North Vietnam, and neither uprisings nor ARVN unit defections occurred in South Vietnam. However, it had far-reaching consequences on the views of the Vietnam War held by the American public and the international community. The offensive had a strong effect on the U.S. government and shocked the American public, which had been led to believe by its political and military leaders that the North Vietnamese were being defeated and incapable of launching such an ambitious military operation. American public support for the war declined as a result of the Tet casualties and the escalation of draft calls. Subsequently, the Johnson administration sought negotiations to end the war. Shortly before the 1968 United States presidential election, Republican candidate and former vice president Richard Nixon discouraged South Vietnamese president Nguyễn Văn Thiệu from cooperating in the negotiations, to cast doubt on Johnson's ability to bring peace.

The name "Tet Offensive" usually refers to the January–February 1968 offensive, but also can be extended to cover all of the 21 weeks of intense combat after the initial attacks in January (including the "Mini-Tet" offensive in May), or the Phase III offensive in August.

== Background ==
=== South Vietnam political context ===
The years prior to the Tet Offensive were marked by political instability and a series of coups after the 1963 South Vietnamese coup. In 1966, the leadership in South Vietnam, represented by the Head of State Nguyễn Văn Thiệu and Prime Minister Nguyễn Cao Kỳ were persuaded to commit to democratic reforms in an effort to stabilize the political situation during a conference in Honolulu. Prior to 1967, the South Vietnamese constituent assembly was in the process of drafting a new constitution and setting eventual elections. After the 1967 South Vietnamese presidential election, the South Vietnamese political situation looked increasingly stable. Rivalries between the generals were becoming less chaotic, and Thiệu and Kỳ formed a joint ticket for the election. Despite efforts by North Vietnam to disrupt elections, higher than usual turnouts marked a shift towards a more democratic structure and ushered in a period of political stability after the instability that had characterized the preceding years.

Protests, campaigning, and the atmosphere of elections were interpreted by the Politburo of the Communist Party of Vietnam and Lê Duẩn as signs the population would embrace a 'general uprising' against the government of South Vietnam. The Politburo sought to exploit perceived instability and maintain political weakness in South Vietnam.

=== United States war strategy ===
During late 1967, the question of whether the U.S. strategy of attrition was working in South Vietnam weighed heavily on the minds of the American public and the administration of President Lyndon B. Johnson. General William C. Westmoreland, the commander of the Military Assistance Command, Vietnam (MACV), believed that if a "crossover point" could be reached, meaning the number of communist troops killed or captured during military operations exceeded those recruited or replaced, the Americans would win the war. There was a discrepancy, however, between the order of battle estimates of the MACV and the Central Intelligence Agency (CIA) concerning the strength of VC guerrilla forces within South Vietnam. In September, members of the MACV intelligence services and the CIA met to prepare a Special National Intelligence Estimate that would be used by the administration to gauge U.S. success in the conflict.

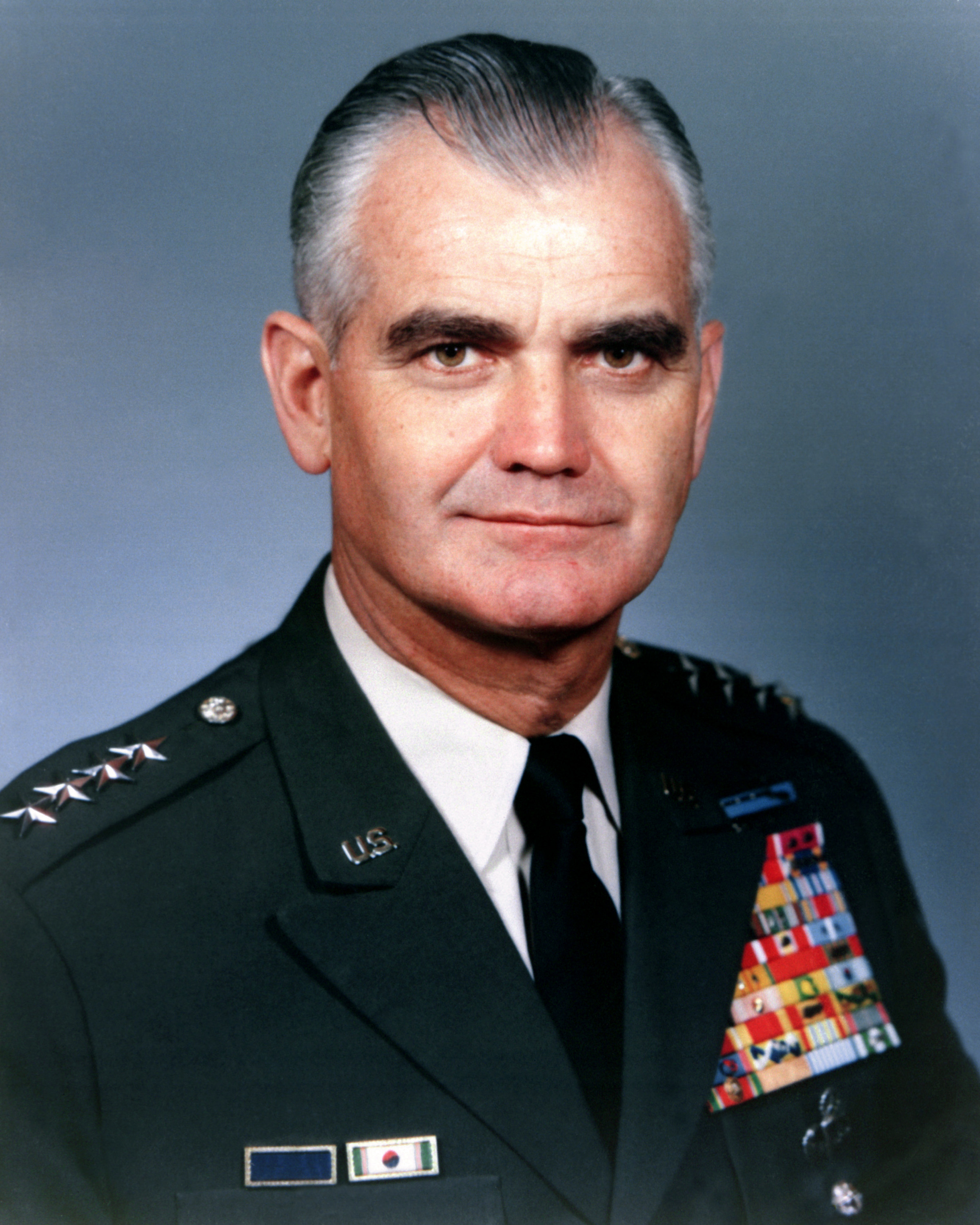
General William C. Westmoreland, COMUSMACV

Provided with an enemy intelligence windfall collected during Operations Cedar Falls and Junction City, the CIA members of the group believed the number of VC guerrillas, irregulars, and cadre within the South could be as high as 430,000. The MACV Combined Intelligence Center, on the other hand, maintained the number could be no more than 300,000. Westmoreland was deeply concerned about the possible perceptions of the American public to such an increased estimate since communist troop strength was routinely provided to reporters during press briefings. According to MACV's chief of intelligence, General Joseph A. McChristian, the new figures "would create a political bombshell", since they demonstrated the North Vietnamese "had the capability and the will to continue a protracted war of attrition".

In May, MACV attempted to reach a compromise with the CIA by maintaining VC militias did not constitute a fighting force but were essentially low-level fifth columnists used for information collection. With the groups deadlocked, George Carver, CIA Special Assistant for Vietnam Affairs, represented the CIA in the last stage of the negotiations. In September, Carver devised a compromise: The CIA would drop its insistence on including the irregulars in the final tally of forces and add a prose addendum to the estimate explaining the agency's position. George Allen, Carver's deputy, placed responsibility for the agency's capitulation with Richard Helms, the director of the CIA. He believed that "it was a political problem ... [Helms] didn't want the agency ... contravening the policy interest of the administration." (Note: This Order of Battle controversy resurfaced in 1982 when Westmoreland filed a lawsuit against CBS News after the airing of its program, The Uncounted Enemy: A Vietnam Deception, which aired had on 23 January 1982.)

During the second half of 1967, the administration had become alarmed by criticism, both inside and outside the government, and by reports of declining public support for its Vietnam policies. According to public opinion polls, the percentage of Americans who believed the U.S. had made a mistake by sending troops to Vietnam had risen from 25 percent in 1965 to 45 percent by December 1967. This trend was fueled not by a belief that the struggle was not worthwhile, but by mounting casualty figures, rising taxes, and the feeling there was no end to the war in sight. A poll taken in November indicated that 55 percent wanted a tougher war policy, exemplified by the public belief that "it was an error for us to have gotten involved in Vietnam in the first place. But now that we're there, let's win—or get out." This prompted the administration to launch a so-called "success offensive", a concerted effort to alter the widespread public perception that the war had reached a stalemate and to convince the American people that the administration's policies were succeeding. Under the leadership of National Security Advisor Walt W. Rostow, the news media then was inundated by a wave of effusive optimism.

Every statistical indicator of progress, from "kill ratios" and "body counts" to village pacification, was fed to the press and to the Congress. "We are beginning to win this struggle", asserted Vice President Hubert H. Humphrey on NBC's Today show in mid-November. "We are on the offensive. The territory is being gained. We are making steady progress." At the end of November, the campaign reached its climax when Johnson summoned Westmoreland and the new U.S. Ambassador, Ellsworth Bunker, to Washington, D.C., for what was billed as a "high-level policy review". Upon their arrival, the two men bolstered the administration's claims of success. From Saigon, pacification chief Robert Komer stated the Civil Operations and Rural Development Support (CORDS) pacification program in the countryside was succeeding, and that sixty-eight percent of the South Vietnamese population was under the control of Saigon while only seventeen percent was under the control of the VC. General Bruce Palmer Jr., one of Westmoreland's three Field Force commanders, claimed that "the Viet Cong has been defeated" and that "He can't get food and he can't recruit. He has been forced to change his strategy from trying to control the people on the coast to try to survive in the mountains."

Westmoreland was even more emphatic in his assertions. At an address at the National Press Club on 21 November, he reported that, as of the end of 1967, the communists were "unable to mount a major offensive ... I am absolutely certain that whereas in 1965 the enemy was winning, today he is certainly losing...We have reached an important point when the end begins to come into view." By the end of the year the administration's approval rating had crept up by eight percent, but an early January Gallup poll indicated that forty-seven percent of the American public still disapproved of the President's handling of the war. The American public, "more confused than convinced, more doubtful than despairing ... adopted a 'wait and see' attitude." During a discussion with an interviewer from Time magazine, Westmoreland dared the communists to launch an attack: "I hope they try something because we are looking for a fight."

== North Vietnam ==
=== Party politics ===
Planning in Hanoi for a winter-spring offensive during 1968 had begun in early 1967 and continued until early the following year. According to American sources, there has been an extreme reluctance among Vietnamese historians to discuss the decision-making process that led to the general offensive and uprising, even decades after the event. In official Vietnamese literature, the decision to launch the Tet offensive is usually presented as the result of a perceived U.S. failure to win the war quickly, the failure of the American bombing campaign against North Vietnam, and the anti-war sentiment that pervaded the population of the U.S. The decision to launch the general offensive, however, was much more complicated.

The decision signaled the end of a bitter, decade-long debate within the North Vietnamese Government between two, and later three, factions. The moderates believed that the economic viability of North Vietnam should come before support of a massive, conventional southern war and they generally followed the Soviet line of peaceful coexistence by reunifying Vietnam through political means. Heading this faction were party theorist Trường Chinh and Minister of Defense Võ Nguyên Giáp. The militant faction, on the other hand, tended to follow the foreign policy line of the People's Republic of China and called for the reunification of the nation by military means and that no negotiations should be undertaken with the Americans. This group was led by Communist Party First Secretary Lê Duẩn and Lê Đức Thọ (no relation). From the early to mid-1960s, the militants had dictated the direction of the war in South Vietnam. General Nguyễn Chí Thanh, the head of Central Office for South Vietnam (COSVN), headquarters for the South, was another prominent militant. The followers of the Chinese line centered their strategy against the U.S. and its allies on large-scale, main force actions rather than the protracted guerrilla war espoused by Mao Zedong.

By 1966–1967, however, after suffering massive casualties, stalemate on the battlefield, and destruction of the northern economy by U.S. aerial bombing, there was a dawning realization that if current trends continued, Hanoi would eventually lack the resources necessary to affect the military situation in the South. As a result, there were more strident calls by the moderates for negotiations and a revision of strategy. They felt a return to guerrilla tactics was more appropriate since the U.S. could not be defeated conventionally. They also complained that the policy of rejecting negotiations was in error. The Americans could only be worn down in a war of wills during a period of "fighting while talking". During 1967 things had become so bad on the battlefield that Lê Duẩn ordered Thanh to incorporate aspects of protracted guerrilla warfare into his strategy.

During the same period, a counter-attack was launched by a new, third faction (the centrists) led by President Ho Chi Minh, Lê Đức Thọ, and Foreign Minister Nguyễn Duy Trinh, who called for negotiations. From October 1966 through April 1967, a very public debate over military strategy took place in print and via radio between Thanh and his rival for military power, Giáp. Giáp had advocated a defensive, primarily guerrilla strategy against the U.S. and South Vietnam. Thanh's position was that Giáp and his adherents were centered on their experiences during the First Indochina War and that they were too "conservative and captive to old methods and past experience... mechanically repeating the past."

The arguments over domestic and military strategy also had a foreign policy element, as North Vietnam, like South Vietnam, was largely dependent on outside military and economic aid. The vast majority of North Vietnam's military equipment was provided by either the Soviet Union or China. Beijing advocated that North Vietnam conduct a protracted war on the Maoist model, fearing that a conventional conflict might draw China in, as had happened in the Korean War. They also resisted the idea of negotiating with the allies. Moscow, on the other hand, advocated negotiations, but simultaneously armed Hanoi's forces to conduct a conventional war on the Soviet model. North Vietnamese foreign policy therefore consisted of maintaining a critical balance between war policy, internal and external policies, domestic adversaries, and foreign allies with "self-serving agendas."

To "break the will of their domestic opponents and reaffirm their autonomy vis-à-vis their foreign allies", hundreds of pro-Soviet, party moderates, military officers, and intelligentsia were arrested on 27 July 1967, during what came to be called the Revisionist Anti-Party Affair. All of the arrests were based on the individual's stance on the Politburo's choice of tactics and strategy for the proposed general offensive. This move cemented the position of the militants as Hanoi's strategy: the rejection of negotiations, the abandonment of protracted warfare, and the focus on the offensive in the towns and cities of South Vietnam. A second wave of arrests occurred in November and December.

=== General offensive and uprising ===
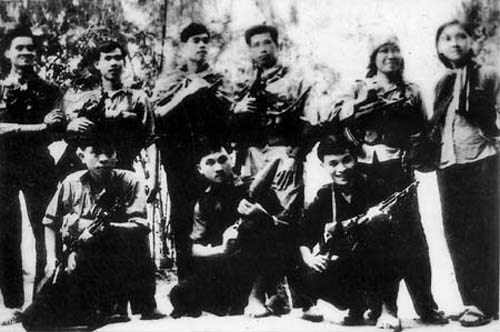
VC prior to departing for Saigon-Gia Định

The operational plan for the general offensive and uprising originated as the "COSVN proposal" at Thanh's southern headquarters in April 1967 and was relayed to Hanoi the following month. Thanh was then ordered to the capital to explain his concept in person to the Military Central Commission. At a meeting in July, Thanh briefed the plan to the Politburo. On the evening of 6 July, after receiving permission to begin preparations for the offensive, Thanh attended a party and died of a heart attack after drinking too much. An alternative account is that Thanh died of injuries sustained in a U.S. bombing raid on COSVN after having been evacuated from Cambodia.

After cementing their position during the Party crackdown, the militants sped up planning for a major conventional offensive to break the military deadlock. They concluded the Saigon government and the U.S. presence were so unpopular with the population of the South that a broad-based attack would spark a spontaneous uprising of the population, which, if the offensive was successful, would enable the North Vietnamese to sweep to a quick, decisive victory. Their basis for this conclusion included: a belief that the South Vietnamese military was no longer combat-effective; the results of the 1967 presidential election (in which the Thiệu/Kỳ ticket had only received 24 percent of the popular vote); the Buddhist crises of 1963 and 1966; well-publicized anti-war demonstrations in Saigon; and continuous criticism of the Thiệu government in the southern press. Launching such an offensive would also put an end to what had been described as "dovish calls for talks, criticism of military strategy, Chinese diatribes of Soviet perfidy, and Soviet pressure to negotiate—all of which needed to be silenced."

In October, the Politburo decided on the Tet holiday as the launch date and met again in December to reaffirm its decision and formalize it at the 14th Plenary session of the Party Central Committee in January 1968. The resulting Resolution 14 was a major blow to domestic opposition and "foreign obstruction". Concessions had been made to the center group, however, by agreeing negotiations were possible, but the document essentially focused on the creation of "a spontaneous uprising in order to win a decisive victory in the shortest time possible."

Contrary to Western belief, Giáp did not plan or command the offensive himself. Thanh's original plan was elaborated on by a party committee headed by Thanh's deputy, Phạm Hùng, and then modified by Giáp. Giáp may have been convinced to toe the line by the arrest and imprisonment of most of the members of his staff during the Revisionist Anti-Communist Party Affair. Although Giáp went to work "reluctantly, under duress", he may have found the task easier due to the fact he was faced with a fait accompli. Since the Politburo had already approved the offensive, all he had to do was make it work. He combined guerrilla operations into a conventional military offensive and shifted the burden of sparking the popular uprising to the VC. If it worked, all would be well and good. If it failed, it would be a failure only for the Communist Party militants. For the moderates and centrists, it offered the prospect of negotiations and a possible end to the American bombing of the North. Only in the eyes of the militants did the offensive become a "go for broke" effort. Others in the Politburo were willing to settle for a much less ambitious "victory".

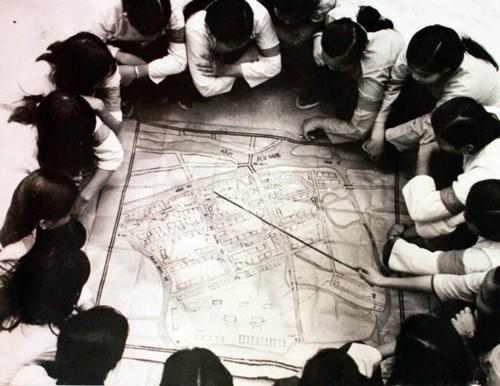
VC special forces study maps of District 7, Saigon, prior to the Tet offensive

The PAVN official history states the objectives of the Tet offensive were to: annihilate and cause the total disintegration of the bulk of the puppet (South Vietnamese) army, overthrow the puppet regime at all administrative levels, and place all government power in the hands of the people; annihilate a significant portion of the American military's troop strength and destroy a significant portion of his war equipment in order to prevent the American forces from being able to carry out their political and military missions; and crush the American will to commit aggression and force the United States to accept defeat in South Vietnam and end all hostile actions against North Vietnam. In addition, this would achieve the immediate goals of the revolution, which were independence, democracy, peace, and neutrality in South Vietnam, and then move toward achieving peace and national unification.

The operation would involve a preliminary phase, with diversionary attacks would be launched in the border areas of South Vietnam to draw American attention and forces away from the cities. The general offensive and uprising would then commence with simultaneous attacks on major allied bases and most urban areas, and with particular emphasis on the cities of Saigon and Huế. Concurrently, a substantial threat would have to be made against the U.S. Khe Sanh Combat Base. The Khe Sanh operation would draw PAVN forces away from the offensive into the cities, but Giáp considered it necessary to protect his supply lines and divert American attention. Attacks on other U.S. forces were of secondary, or even tertiary importance, since Giáp considered his main objective to be weakening or destroying the South Vietnamese military and government through popular revolt. The offensive, therefore, was aimed at influencing the South Vietnamese public. There is conflicting evidence as to whether, or to what extent, the offensive was intended to influence either the March primaries or the November presidential election in the U.S.

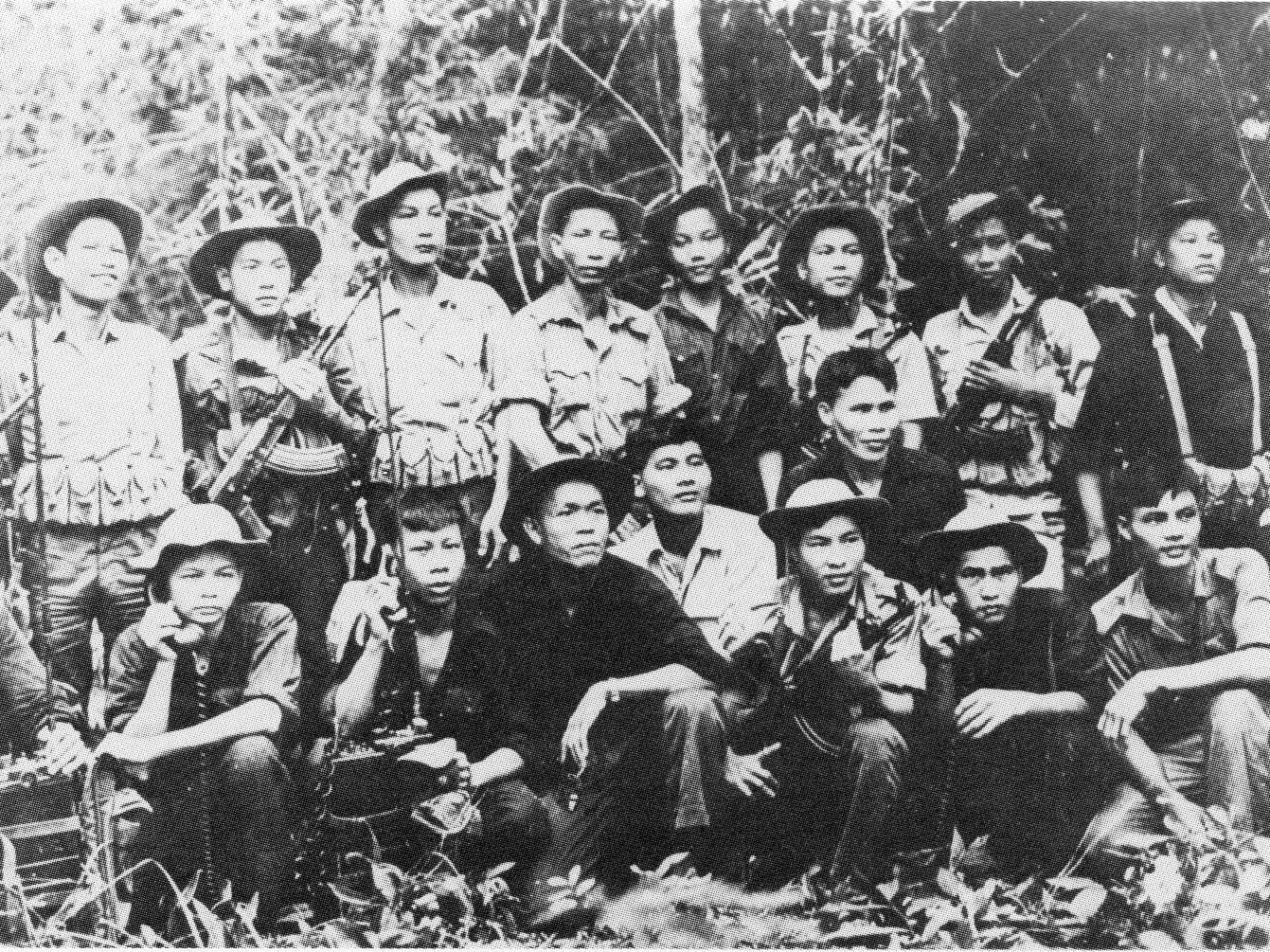
VC troops pose with new AK-47 assault rifles and American field radios.

The offensive had three distinct phases: Phase I, scheduled to begin on 31 January (though some attacks were launched prematurely on 30 January), would be a countrywide assault on the cities, conducted primarily by VC forces. Concurrently, a propaganda offensive to induce ARVN troops to desert and the South Vietnamese population to rise up against the government would be launched. If outright victory was not achieved, it might still lead to the creation of a coalition government and the withdrawal of the Americans. If the general offensive failed to achieve these purposes, follow-up operations would be conducted to wear down the enemy and lead to a negotiated settlement. Phase II began on 5 May and Phase III on 17 August.

Preparations for the offensive were already underway. The logistical build-up began in mid-year, and by January 1968, 81,000 tons of supplies and 200,000 troops, including seven complete infantry regiments and 20 independent battalions made the trip south on the Ho Chi Minh trail. This logistical effort also involved re-arming the VC with new AK-47 assault rifles and B-40 rocket-propelled grenade launchers, which gave them superior firepower against the ARVN. To pave the way and to confuse the allies as to its intentions, Hanoi launched a diplomatic offensive. Foreign Minister Trinh announced on 30 December that Hanoi would rather than could open negotiations if the U.S. unconditionally ended Operation Rolling Thunder, the bombing campaign against North Vietnam. This announcement provoked a flurry of diplomatic activity during the last weeks of the year.

South Vietnamese military intelligence estimated PAVN/VC forces in South Vietnam at the end of 1967 totaled 323,000 men, including 130,000 regulars (this figure did not distinguish PAVN from VC), 160,000 guerrillas and members of the infrastructure, and 33,000 service and support troops. They were organized into nine divisions composed of 35 infantry and 20 artillery or anti-aircraft artillery regiments, which were, in turn, composed of 230 infantry and six sapper battalions.

MACV intelligence estimated total PAVN/VC forces in January 1968, on the eve of the offensive, at 225,346, of whom 55,744 were in PAVN units, and another 10,000 to 12,000 were North Vietnamese serving in VC units. This total included 115,016 regulars, 72,605 guerrillas, and 37,725 service and support troops. MACV believed the infrastructure had a strength of 84,000, but did not include these in the figure it called "grand total." Including the infrastructure would have raised the total to 309,346.

MACV decided long afterward that its January 1968 figures had been serious underestimates, and that actual PAVN/VC strength (not including infrastructure) in January 1968 had been 287,465, of which 155,945 were regulars.

== U.S. preparedness ==
=== Suspicions and diversions ===
Signs of impending communist action were noticed by allied intelligence organizations in Saigon. During the late summer and fall of 1967 both South Vietnamese and U.S. intelligence agencies collected clues that indicated a significant shift in communist strategic planning. By mid-December, mounting evidence convinced many in Washington and Saigon something big was underway. During the last three months of the year intelligence agencies had detected signs of a major North Vietnamese military buildup. In addition to captured documents (a copy of Resolution 13, for example, was captured by early October), observations of enemy logistical operations were also quite clear: in October, the number of trucks observed heading south through Laos on the Ho Chi Minh trail jumped from the previous monthly average of 480 to 1,116. By November this total reached 3,823 and, in December, 6,315. On 20 December, Westmoreland cabled Washington that he expected the PAVN/VC "to undertake an intensified countrywide effort, perhaps a maximum effort, over a relatively short period of time."

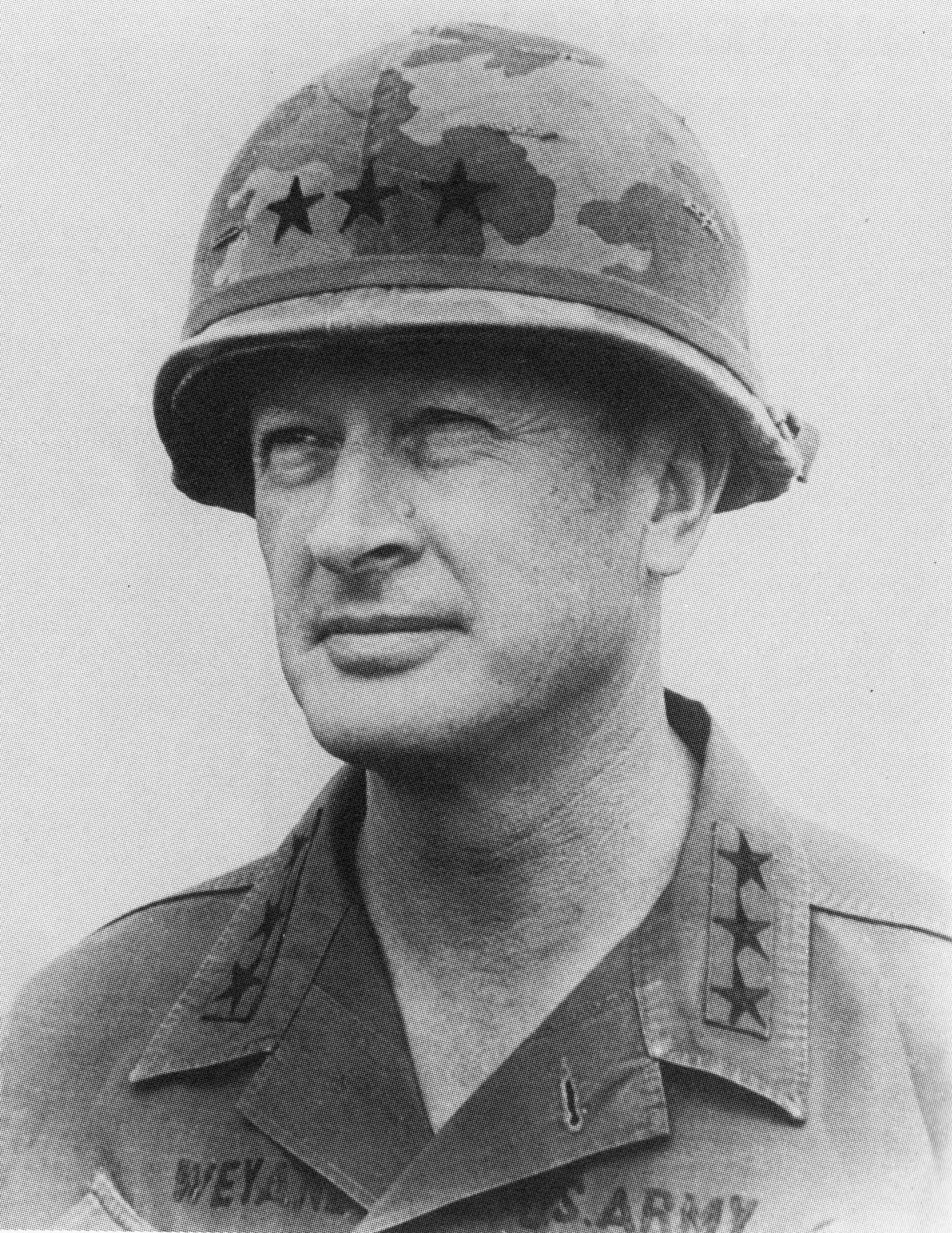
Lieutenant General Frederick Weyand, commander of II Field Force, Vietnam

Despite all the warning signs, however, the allies were still surprised by the scale and scope of the offensive. According to ARVN Colonel Hoang Ngoc Lung the reason was allied intelligence methodology itself, which tended to estimate the enemy's probable course of action based upon their capabilities, not their intentions. Since, in the allied estimation, the communists hardly had the capability to launch such an ambitious enterprise: "There was little possibility that the enemy could initiate a general offensive, regardless of his intentions." The answer could also be partially explained by the lack of coordination and cooperation between competing intelligence branches, both South Vietnamese and American. The situation from the U.S. perspective was summed up by an MACV intelligence analyst: "If we'd gotten the whole battle plan, it wouldn't have been believed. It wouldn't have been credible to us." The Tet offensive would later be used in a textbook at West Point as an example of "an allied intelligence failure to rank with Pearl Harbor in 1941 or the Ardennes offensive in 1944."

From early to late 1967, the U.S. command in Saigon was perplexed by a series of attacks initiated by the PAVN/VC in the border regions. On 24 April a U.S. Marine Corps patrol prematurely triggered a PAVN offensive aimed at taking Khe Sanh Combat Base, the western anchor of the Marines' defensive positions in Quảng Trị Province. For 49 days during early September and lasting into October, the PAVN began shelling the U.S. Marine outpost of Con Thien, just south of the Demilitarized Zone (DMZ). The intense shelling (100–150 rounds per day) prompted Westmoreland to launch Operation Neutralize, an intense aerial bombardment campaign of 4,000 sorties into and just north of the DMZ.

On 27 October, an ARVN battalion at Sông Bé, the capital of Phước Long Province, came under attack by an entire PAVN regiment. Two days later, another PAVN regiment attacked a U.S. Special Forces border outpost at Lộc Ninh, in Bình Long Province. This attack sparked a ten-day battle drawing in elements of the U.S. 1st Infantry Division and the ARVN 18th Division and left 800 PAVN troops dead at its conclusion.

The most severe of what came to be known as "the Border Battles" erupted during October and November around Dak To, another border outpost in Kontum Province. The clashes there between the four regiments of the PAVN B3 Front against the U.S. 4th Infantry Division, four ARVN infantry/airborne battalions, and the reinforced U.S. 173rd Airborne Brigade lasted for 22 days. By the time the fighting was over, between 1,200 and 1,600 PAVN and 262 U.S. troops had been killed. MACV intelligence was confused by the possible motives of the North Vietnamese in initiating such large-scale actions in remote regions where U.S. artillery and aerial firepower could be applied indiscriminately. By their estimation, tactically and strategically, these operations made no sense. From the North Vietnamese perspective they had accomplished the first stage of their plan: to fix the attention of the U.S. command on the borders and draw the bulk of U.S. forces away from the heavily populated coastal lowlands and cities.

Westmoreland was most concerned with the situation at Khe Sanh, where, on 21 January 1968, a force estimated at 20,000–40,000 PAVN troops had besieged the U.S. Marine garrison. MACV was convinced the PAVN planned to stage an attack and overrun the base as a prelude to an all-out effort to seize the two northernmost provinces of South Vietnam. To deter any such possibility, he deployed 250,000 men, including half of MACV's U.S. maneuver battalions, to I Corps.

This course of events disturbed Lieutenant general Frederick Weyand, commander of U.S. forces in III Corps, which included the sensitive Capital Military District. Weyand, a former intelligence officer, was suspicious of the pattern of communist activities in his area of responsibility and notified Westmoreland of his concerns on 10 January. Westmoreland agreed with his estimate and ordered 15 U.S. battalions to redeploy from positions near the Cambodian border back to the outskirts of Saigon. When the offensive did begin, a total of 27 allied maneuver battalions defended the city and the surrounding area. This redeployment may have been one of the most critical tactical decisions of the war.

=== Before the offensive ===
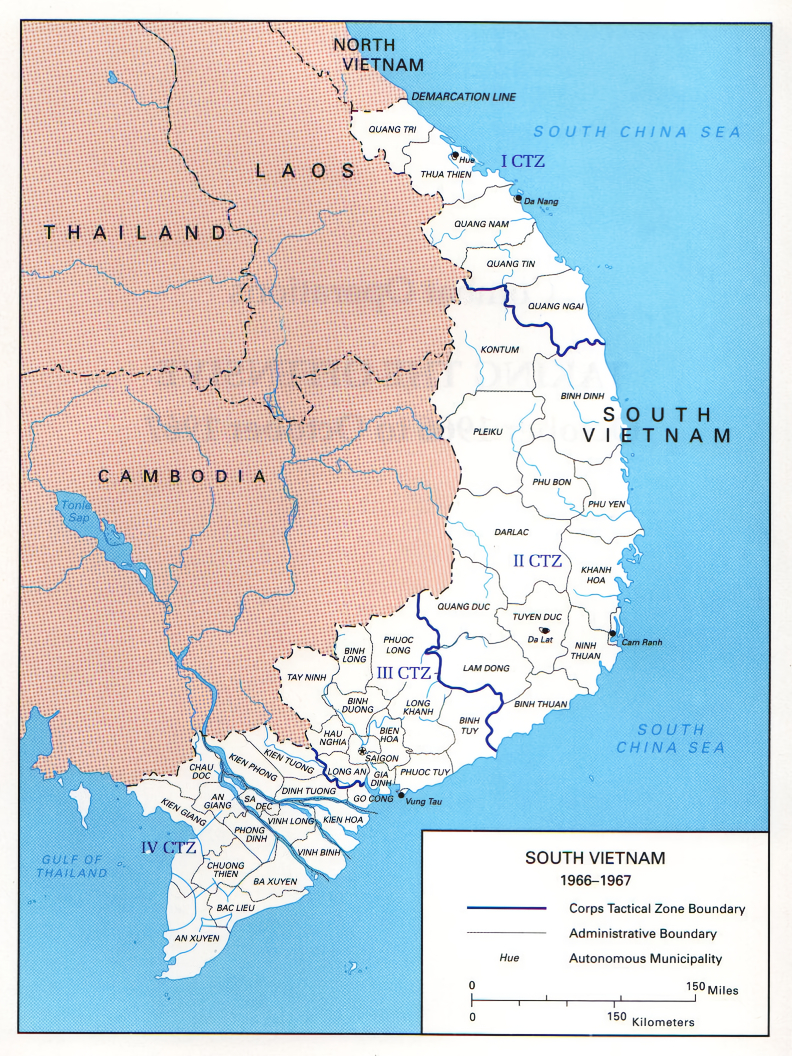
South Vietnam, Corps Tactical Zones

By the beginning of January 1968, the U.S. had 331,098 Army personnel and 78,013 Marines in nine divisions, an armored cavalry regiment, and two separate brigades in South Vietnam. Allied forces included the 1st Australian Task Force, a Royal Thai Army regiment, two Republic of Korea Army infantry divisions, and the Republic of Korea Marine Corps brigade. South Vietnamese strength totaled 350,000 regulars in the Army, Air Force, Navy and Marine Corps. They were in turn supported by the 151,000-man South Vietnamese Regional Forces and 149,000-man South Vietnamese Popular Forces, which were the equivalent of regional and local militias.

In the days immediately preceding the offensive, the preparedness of allied forces was relatively relaxed. Hanoi had announced in October it would observe a seven-day truce from 27 January to 3 February for the Tet holiday, and the South Vietnamese military made plans to allow leave for approximately half of its forces. Westmoreland, who had already cancelled the truce in I Corps, requested that South Vietnam cancel the upcoming cease-fire, but Thiệu (who had already reduced the cease-fire to 36 hours), refused to do so, claiming it would damage troop morale and only benefit communist propagandists.

On 28 January, 11 VC cadres were captured in the city of Qui Nhơn carrying two pre-recorded audio tapes whose message appealed to the populace in "already occupied Saigon, Huế, and Da Nang". The following afternoon, General Cao Văn Viên, chief of the South Vietnamese Joint General Staff, ordered his four Corps commanders to place their troops on alert. There was still a lack of a sense of urgency on the part of the allies. If Westmoreland had a grasp of the potential danger, he did not communicate it clearly others. On the evening of 30 January, 200 U.S. officers—all of whom served on the MACV intelligence staff—attended a pool party at their quarters in Saigon. According to James Meecham, an analyst at the Combined Intelligence Center who attended the party: "I had no conception Tet was coming, absolutely zero ... Of the 200-odd officers present, not one I talked to knew Tet was coming, without exception."

Westmoreland also failed to communicate his concerns adequately to Washington. Although he had warned the President between 25 and 30 January that "widespread" communist attacks were in the offing, his admonitions were so oblique or so hedged with official optimism that even the administration was unprepared. No one—in either Washington or Vietnam—was expecting what happened.

Weyand invited CBS News Correspondent John Laurence and Washington Post reporter Don Oberdorfer to his III Corps headquarters in the week before the Tet offensive to alert them that a major enemy attack was coming "just before or just after Tet." He said the Vietnamese had too much respect for the holiday to attack during Tet itself. Weyand said he had moved 30 U.S. and South Vietnamese battalions closer to Saigon to defend the city.

== Offensive ==
"Crack the Sky, Shake the Earth"

— Message to North Vietnamese forces who were informed that they were "about to inaugurate the greatest battle in the history of our country".

The first wave of attacks began shortly after midnight on 30 January as five provincial capitals in II Corps were attacked. Nha Trang, headquarters of the U.S. I Field Force, was the first to be hit, followed shortly by Buôn Ma Thuột, Kontum, Qui Nhơn, and Pleiku. During that night, a little before dawn, the PAVN/VC also attacked military facilities in Danang, as well as Hoi An and the city of Quang Tri in I Corps. Typically these were battalion or multi-battalion attacks, sometimes preceded by mortar or rocket bombardments.

The operations, however, were not well coordinated at the local level. By daylight almost all PAVN/VC forces had been repelled from their objectives. In Nha Trang, 377 Vietcong had been killed and another 77 captured, while the ARVN garrison had lost 88 killed and another 32 civilian fatalities. General Phillip B. Davidson, the new MACV chief of intelligence, notified Westmoreland that "This is going to happen in the rest of the country tonight and tomorrow morning." All U.S. forces were placed on maximum alert and similar orders were issued to all ARVN units. The allies, however, still responded without any real sense of urgency. Orders cancelling leaves either came too late or were disregarded.

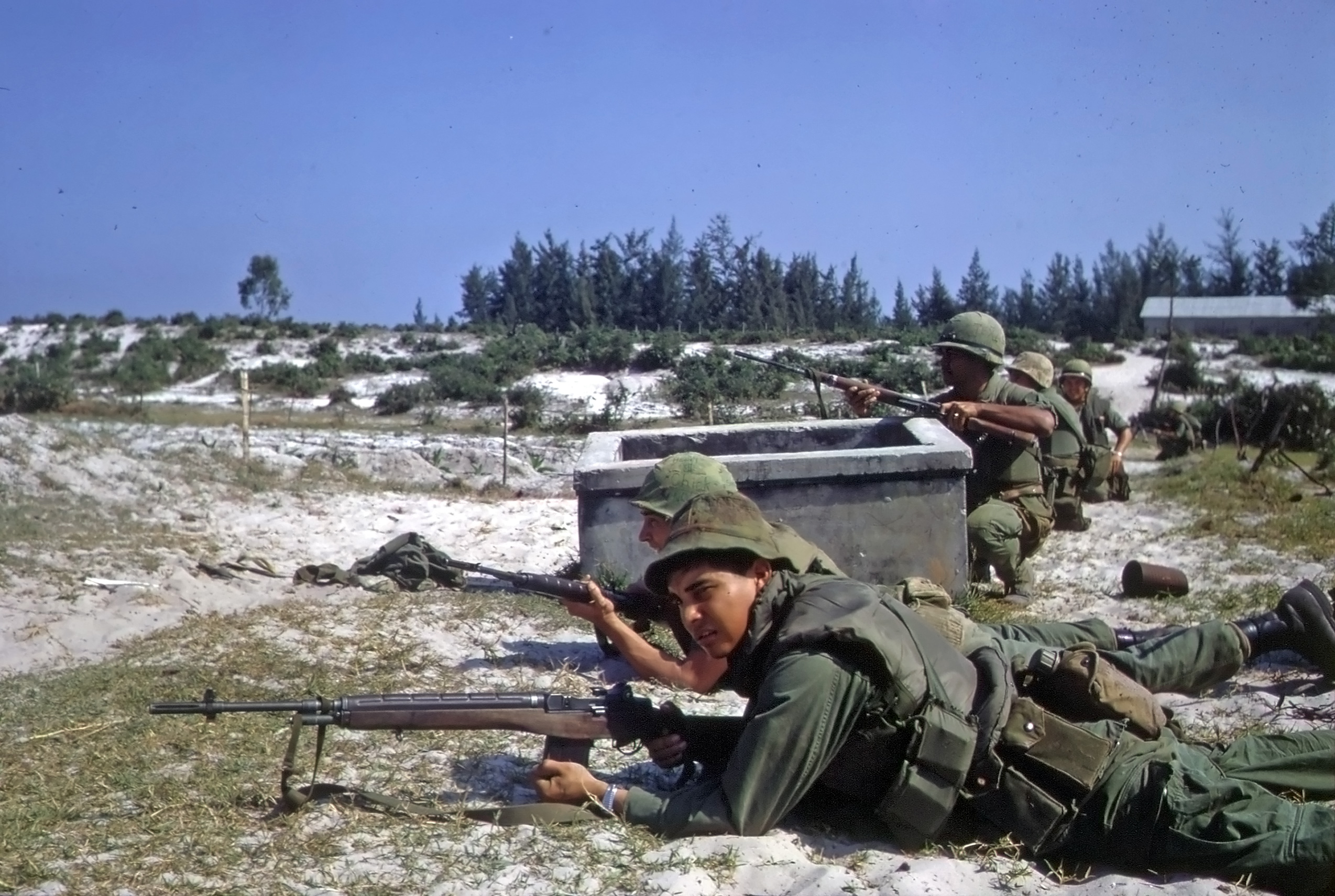
U.S. Marines with M14 rifles battle in Nam O village near Da Nang

At 03:00 on 31 January PAVN/VC forces attacked Saigon, Cholon, and Gia Định in the Capital Military District; Quảng Trị city, Huế, Tam Kỳ and Quảng Ngãi as well as U.S. bases at Phú Bài and Chu Lai in I Corps; Phan Thiết, Tuy Hòa and U.S. installations at Bong Son and An Khê in II Corps; and Cần Thơ and Vĩnh Long in IV Corps. The following day, Biên Hòa, Long Thanh, Bình Dương in III Corps and Kien Hoa, Dinh Tuong, Gò Công, Kiên Giang, Vĩnh Bình, Bến Tre, and Kien Tuong in IV Corps were assaulted. The last attack of the first phase was launched against Bạc Liêu in IV Corps on 10 February. A total of approximately 84,000 PAVN/VC troops participated in the attacks while thousands more remained uncommitted to act as reinforcements or as blocking forces. Palmer gave a figure of 70,000. PAVN/VC forces also mortared or rocketed every major allied airfield and attacked 64 district capitals and scores of smaller towns.

In most cases the defense was led by the South Vietnamese. Local militia or ARVN forces, supported by the South Vietnamese National Police, usually drove the attackers out within two or three days, sometimes within hours; but heavy fighting continued several days longer in Kon Tum, Buôn Ma Thuột, Phan Thiết, Cần Thơ, and Bến Tre. The outcome in each instance was usually dictated by the ability of local commanders—some were outstanding, others were cowardly or incompetent. During this crucial crisis, however, no South Vietnamese unit broke or defected to the communists.

According to Westmoreland, he responded to the news of the attacks with optimism in both media presentations and his reports to Washington. According to closer observers, however, the General was "stunned that the communists had been able to coordinate so many attacks in such secrecy", and he was "dispirited and deeply shaken." According to Clark Clifford, at the time of the initial attacks the reaction of the U.S. military leadership "approached panic". Although Westmoreland's appraisal of the military situation was correct, he made himself look foolish by continuously insisting Khe Sanh was the real objective of the North Vietnamese and that 155 attacks by 84,000 troops was a diversion (a position he maintained until at least 12 February). Washington Post reporter Peter Braestrup summed up the feelings of his colleagues by asking "How could any effort against Saigon, especially downtown Saigon, be a diversion?"

=== Saigon ===
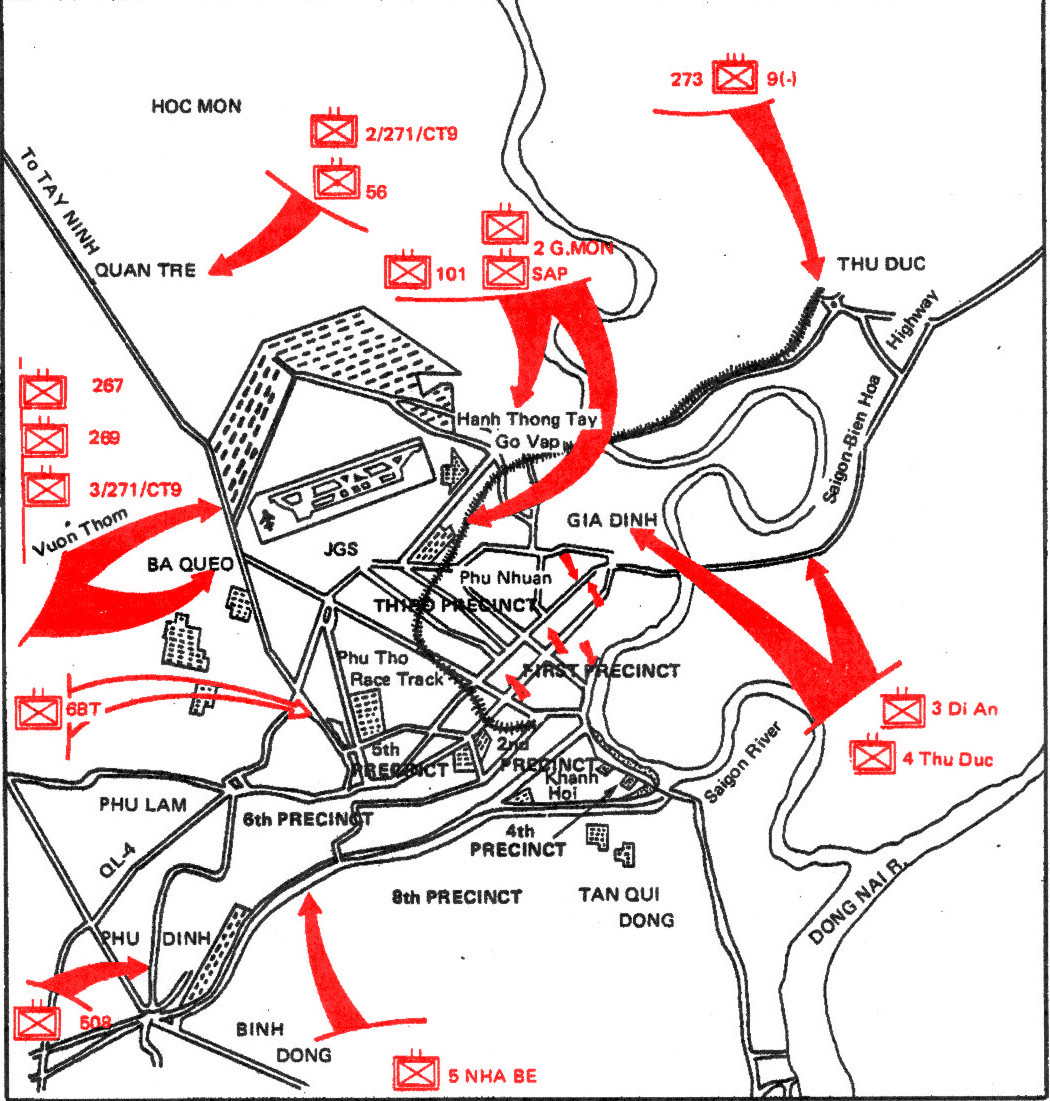
Attacks on Saigon

Although Saigon was the focal point of the offensive, the PAVN/VC did not seek a total takeover of the city. Rather, they had six primary targets to strike in the downtown area: the headquarters of the ARVN Joint General Staff, Tan Son Nhut Air Base, the Independence Palace, the US Embassy in Saigon, the Republic of Vietnam Navy Headquarters and Radio Saigon. Elsewhere in the city or its outskirts, ten VC Local Force Battalions attacked the central police station and the Artillery Command and the Armored Command headquarters (both at Gò Vấp). The plan called for all these initial forces to capture and hold their positions for 48 hours, by which time reinforcements were to have arrived to relieve them.

The defense of the Capital Military District was primarily a South Vietnamese responsibility initially conducted by eight ARVN infantry battalions and the local police force. By 3 February they had been reinforced by five ARVN Ranger, five Marine Corps, and five ARVN Airborne battalions. U.S. Army units taking part in the defense included the 716th Military Police Battalion, seven infantry battalions (one mechanized), and six artillery battalions.

At the Armored Command and Artillery Command headquarters on the northern edge of the city, the initial PAVN plan called for the use of tanks and artillery pieces they hoped to capture in the initial assault. Their planners had not known the tanks had been moved to another base two months earlier and the breechblocks of the artillery pieces had been removed, rendering them useless.

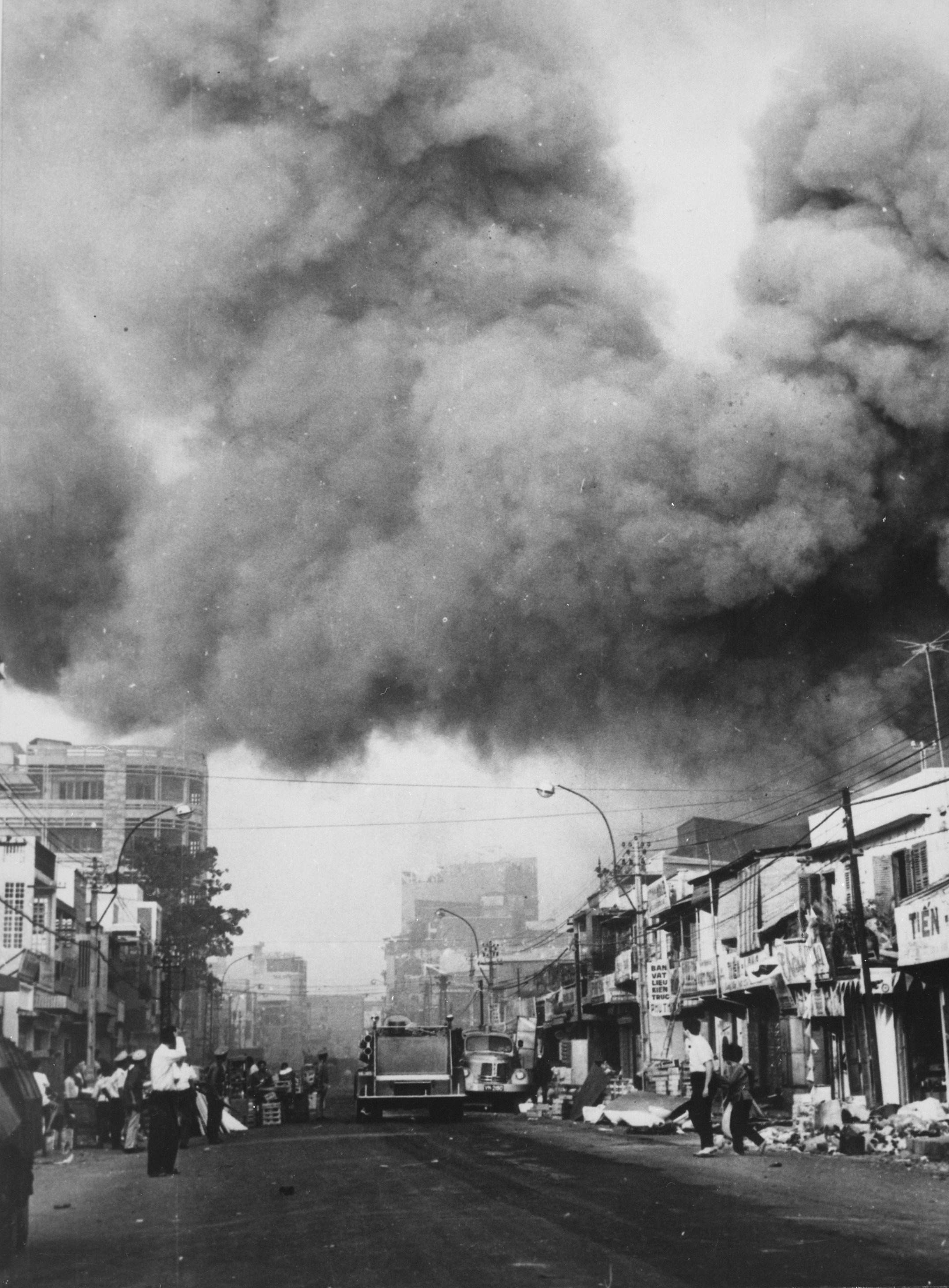
Black smoke covers areas of Sài Gòn during Tet offensive.

One of the most important symbolic and propagandistic targets in the city was Radio Saigon. PAVN troops had brought along a tape recording of Hồ Chi Minh announcing the liberation of Saigon and calling for a "General Uprising" against the Thiệu government. They seized the building and held it for six hours. Then, running out of ammunition, the last eight attackers destroyed the station and killed themselves using explosive charges. They were never able to broadcast because the audio lines from the main studio to the tower were cut as soon as the station was seized.

The US Embassy in Saigon, a massive six-floor building situated within a four-acre compound, was attacked at 02:45 by a 19-man sapper team that gained entry by blowing a hole in the 8-foot-high (2.4 m) surrounding wall. Their officers were killed in the initial attack and when their attempt to gain access to the building failed the sappers occupied the chancery grounds. By 09:20 the compound was secured by U.S. reinforcements, with the loss of five U.S. personnel.

At 03:00 on 31 January, 12 VC sappers approached the Vietnamese Navy Headquarters in two civilian cars, killed two guards at a barricade at Me Linh Square and then advanced towards the base gate. The gunfire alerted base sentries, who secured the gate and sounded the alarm. A .30-caliber machine gun on the second floor of the headquarters disabled both cars and killed or wounded several sappers while the Navy security force organized a counterattack. Simultaneously a U.S. Navy advisor contacted U.S. military police who soon attacked the VC from adjoining streets. The resulting crossfire killed eight sappers while two were captured.

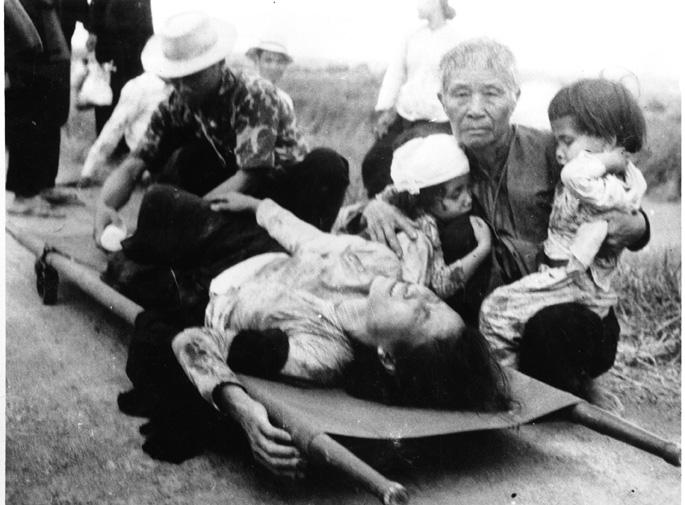
Victims of communist shells in Khánh Hội, Saigon during Tet

Small squads of VC fanned out across the city to attack various officers and enlisted men's billets, homes of ARVN officers, and district police stations. Provided with "blacklists" of military officers and civil servants, they began to round up and execute any that could be found.

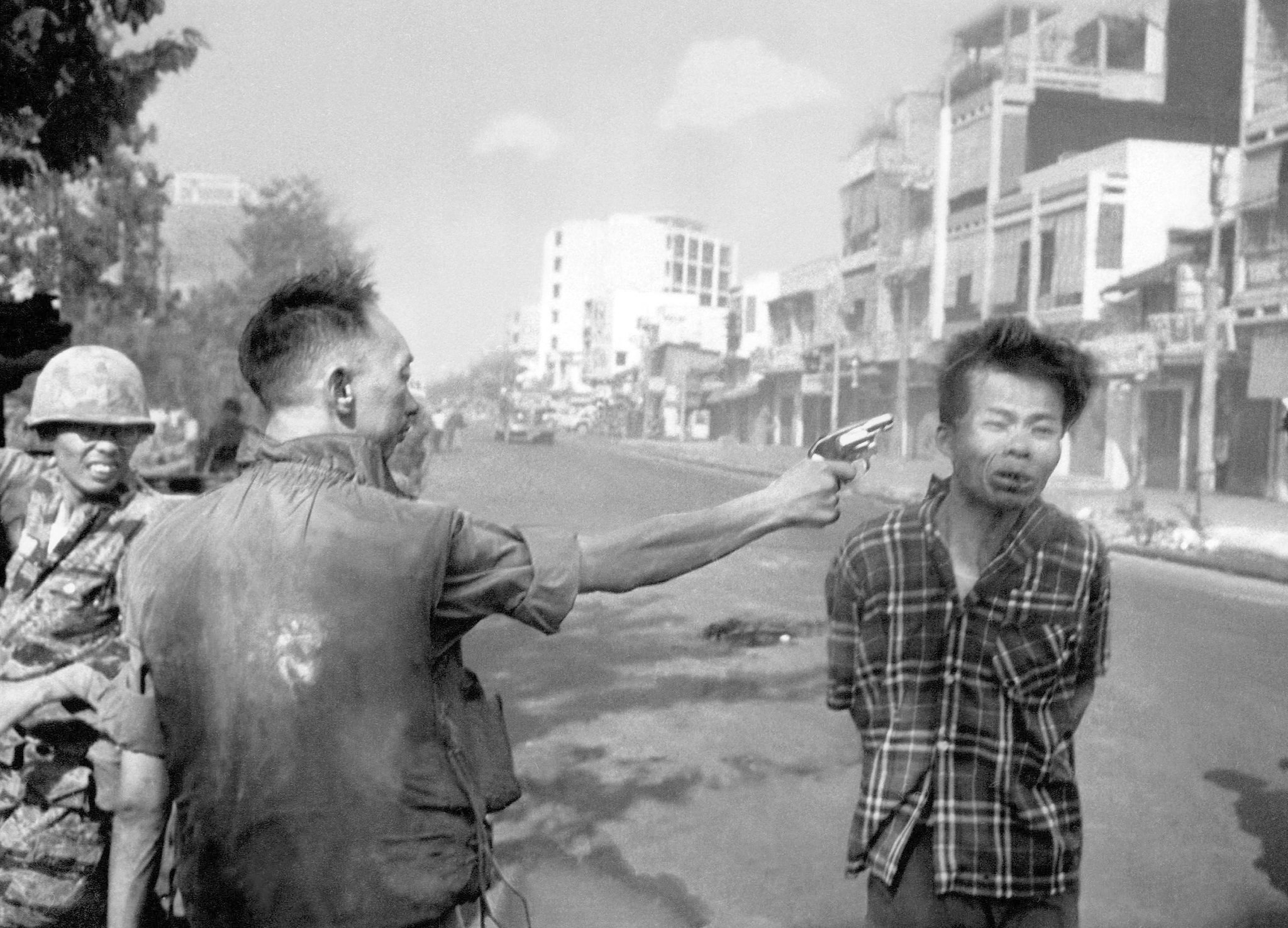
The execution of Viet Cong captain

On 1 February, General Nguyễn Ngọc Loan, chief of the National Police, publicly executed VC officer Nguyễn Văn Lém in front of photographer Eddie Adams and a film cameraman. That photograph, with the title Saigon Execution, won the 1969 Pulitzer Prize for Spot News Photography and is widely seen as a defining moment in the Vietnam War for its influence on U.S. public opinion, even being called "the picture that lost the war".

Outside the city proper, two VC battalions attacked the U.S. logistical and headquarters complex at Long Binh Post. Biên Hòa Air Base was targeted by a battalion, while the adjacent ARVN III Corps headquarters was the objective of another. Tan Son Nhut Air Base, in the northwestern part of the city, was attacked by three battalions. A combat-ready battalion of ARVN paratroopers, awaiting transport to Da Nang, went directly into action, assisting the United States Air Force's 377th Security Police Squadron and the U.S. Army's 3rd Squadron, 4th Cavalry Regiment in halting the attack. A total of 35 PAVN/VC battalions, many composed of undercover cadres who had lived and worked within the capital or its environs for years, were committed to the Saigon objectives. By dawn most of the attacks within the city center had been defeated, but severe fighting between VC and allied forces erupted in the Chinese neighborhood of Cholon around the Phú Thọ racetrack, southwest of the city center. The area was being used as a staging area and command and control center by the PAVN/VC. Bitter and destructive house-to-house fighting erupted in the area. On 4 February, the residents were ordered to leave their homes and the area was declared a free fire zone. Fighting in the city came to a close only after a fierce battle between the ARVN Rangers and PAVN forces on 7 March.

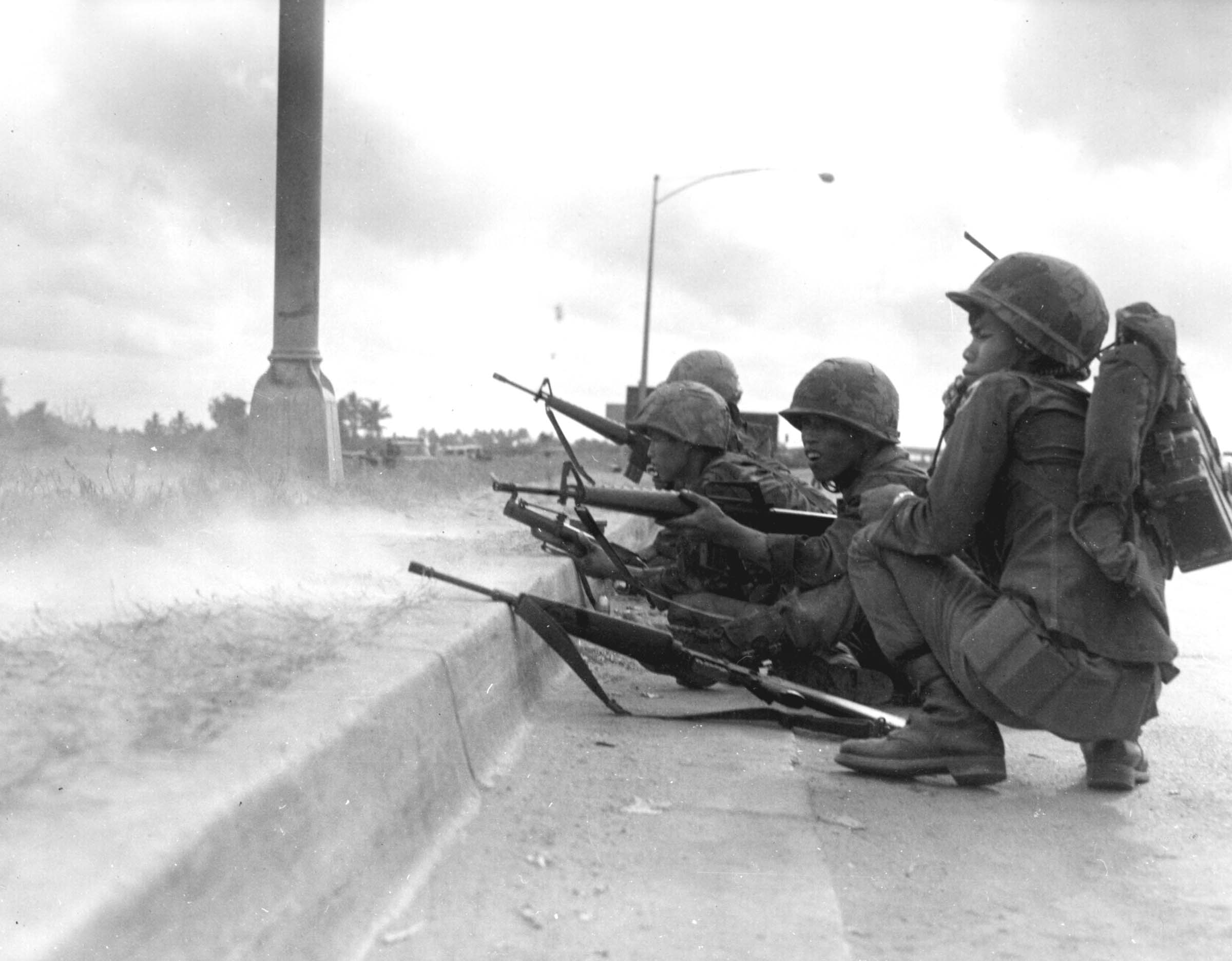
ARVN Rangers defending Saigon in 1968 Battle of Saigon

On the morning of 2 March 1968, while patrolling 4 miles (6.4 km) north of Tan Son Nhut Air Base near the small village of Quoi Xuan to locate VC rocket sites, Company C, 4th Battalion, 9th Infantry Regiment walked into an ambush losing 48 killed in eight minutes. U.S. forces claimed they killed 20 VC. Specialist Nicholas J. Cutinha would be posthumously awarded the Medal of Honor for his actions at Quoi Xuan. General Fillmore K. Mearns would describe this as "a classic example of a properly executed ambush." The following day as US troops swept the area they were engaged by VC forces in an eight-hour battle losing three dead while killing 10 VC.

By early March more than 20 VC battalions remained near Gia Định Province, threatening Saigon. While most of these units had suffered heavy losses in the offensive, their continued presence applied pressure on Saigon and prevented the reestablishment of complete South Vietnamese Government control. From 11 March to 7 April, Allied forces launched Operation Quyet Thang to pacify the area around Saigon. The operation was considered a success and the U.S. claimed 2,658 VC killed and 427 captured. It was followed immediately by Operation Toan Thang I (8 April – 31 May), which expanded the security operation across III Corps and resulted in a further 7,645 VC killed and 1,708 captured for South Vietnamese losses of 708 killed, U.S. losses of 564 killed and other Allied losses of 23 killed.

=== Huế ===
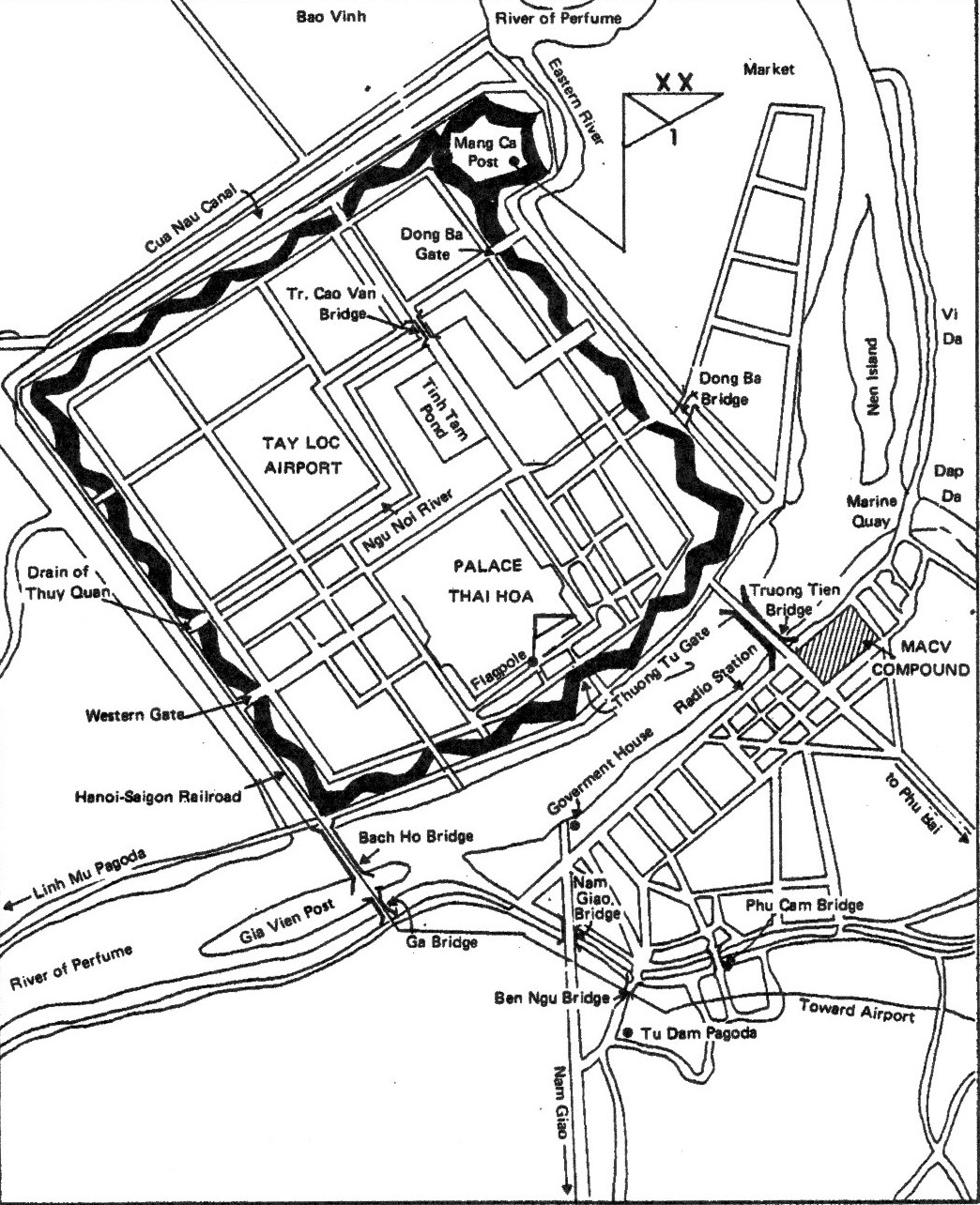
Huế and the Citadel

At 03:40 on the morning of 31 January, allied defensive positions north of the Hương River in the city of Huế were mortared and rocketed and then attacked by VC formations accompanied by two battalions of the PAVN 6th Regiment. Their target was the ARVN 1st Division headquarters located in the Citadel, a three-square mile complex of palaces, parks, and residences, surrounded by a moat and a massive earth and masonry fortress. The undermanned ARVN defenders, led by General Ngô Quang Trưởng, managed to hold their position, but the majority of the Citadel fell to the PAVN. On the south bank of the river, the PAVN 4th Regiment attempted to seize the local MACV headquarters, but was held at bay by a makeshift force of approximately 200 Americans. The rest of the city was overrun by PAVN forces that initially totaled approximately 7,500 men. Both sides then rushed to reinforce and resupply their forces. Lasting 25 days, the battle of Huế became one of the longest and bloodiest single battles of the Vietnam War.

During the first days of the North Vietnamese occupation, U.S. intelligence vastly underestimated the number of PAVN troops involved. Westmoreland informed the Joint Chiefs that "the enemy has approximately three companies in the Huế Citadel and the marines have sent a battalion into the area to clear them out." A later assessment ultimately noted three Marine and 11 Vietnamese battalions engaged at least 8 PAVN/VC battalions of the PAVN 6th Regiment, not including the large number of forces outside the city.

There were no U.S. formations stationed in Huế, and relief forces had to move up from Phu Bai Combat Base, eight kilometers to the southeast. In a misty drizzle, U.S. Marines of the 1st Marine Division and soldiers of the 1st ARVN Division and Marine Corps cleared the city street by street and house by house, a deadly and destructive form of urban combat the U.S. military had not engaged in since the Battle of Seoul during the Korean War, and for which neither side was trained. Because of poor weather conditions, logistics problems and the historical and cultural significance of the city, American forces did not immediately apply air and artillery strikes as widely as they had in other cities.

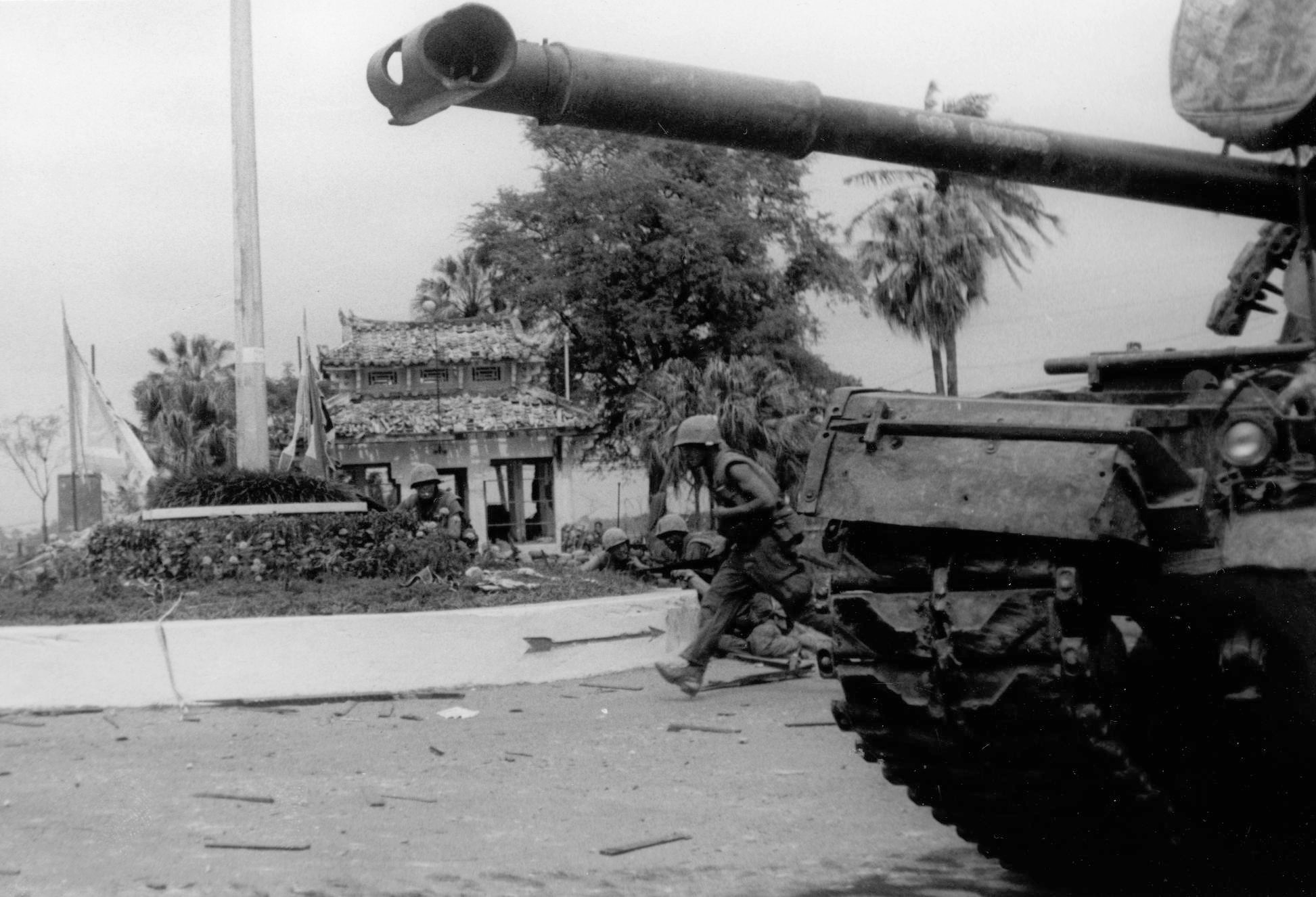
U.S. Marines advance past an M48 Patton tank during the battle for Huế.

VC forces around Huế included six main-force battalions, and two PAVN regiments operated in the area. As the battle unfolded three more PAVN regiments shifted from Khe Sanh arrived as reinforcements. The North Vietnamese plan of attack on Huế involved intensive preparation and reconnaissance. Over 190 targets, including every government and military installation on both sides of the river would be hit on January 31 by a force of five thousand. Other forces would block American and ARVN reinforcement routes, mainly Highway 1. Over half of the ARVN 1st Division was on holiday leave and PAVN commanders believed the population of Huế would join the fight as a part of the General Uprising.

Outside Huế, elements of the U.S. 1st Cavalry Division and the 101st Airborne Division fought to seal PAVN access and cut off their lines of supply and reinforcement. By this point 16 to 18 PAVN battalions (8,000–11,000 men) were involved in the fighting for the city or the approaches to the city. During most of February, the allies gradually fought their way towards the Citadel, which was recaptured after 25 days of intense fighting. The city was not declared secured by U.S. and ARVN forces until 25 February, when members of the ARVN 2nd Battalion, 3rd Regiment, 1st Division raised the South Vietnamese flag over the Palace of Perfect Peace.

During the intense action, the allies estimated PAVN forces lost between 1,042 and 5,000 killed and 89 captured in the city and in the surrounding area. 216 U.S. Marines and soldiers had been killed during the fighting and 1,609 were wounded. 421 ARVN troops were killed, another 2,123 were wounded, and 31 were missing. More than 5,800 civilians had lost their lives during the battle and 116,000 were left homeless out of an original population of 140,000. 40–50% of Huế was destroyed by the end of the battle.

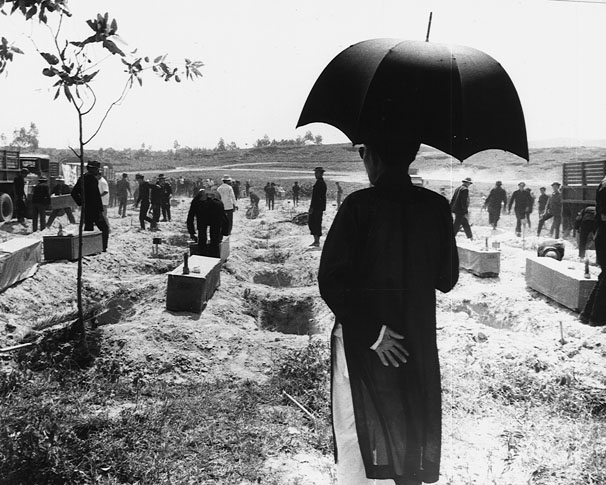
Burial of 300 victims of the 1968 Hue massacre

In the aftermath of the recapture of the city, the discovery of several mass graves (the last of which were uncovered in 1970) of South Vietnamese citizens of Huế sparked a controversy that has not diminished with time. The victims had either been clubbed or shot to death or simply buried alive. The official allied explanation was that during their initial occupation of the city, the PAVN had quickly begun to systematically round up (under the guise of re-education) and then execute as many as 2,800 South Vietnamese civilians they believed to be potentially hostile to communist control. (Note: This was the version given in Douglas Pike's The Viet Cong Strategy of Terror, published by the U.S. Mission in 1970.) Those taken into custody included South Vietnamese military personnel, present and former government officials, local civil servants, teachers, policemen, and religious figures. Historian Gunther Lewy claimed a captured VC document stated that the communists had "eliminated 1,892 administrative personnel, 38 policemen, 790 tyrants." The North Vietnamese officer, Bùi Tín, later further muddied the waters by stating that their forces had indeed rounded up "reactionary" captives for transport to the North, but that local commanders, under battlefield exigencies, had executed them for expediency's sake.

Trưởng believed that the captives had been executed by the communists to protect the identities of members of the local VC infrastructure. The exact circumstances leading to the deaths of those citizens of Huế discovered in the mass graves may never be known exactly, but most of the victims were killed as a result of PAVN and VC executions, considering evidence from captured documents and witness testimonies.

=== Khe Sanh ===
The attack on Khe Sanh, which began on 21 January, probably served two purposes—as a real attempt to seize the position or as a diversion to draw American attention and forces away from the population centers in the lowlands, a deception that was "both plausible and easy to orchestrate." In Westmoreland's view, the purpose of the base was to provoke the North Vietnamese into a focused and prolonged confrontation in a confined geographic area, one that would allow the application of massive U.S. artillery and air strikes that would inflict heavy casualties in a relatively unpopulated region. By the end of 1967, MACV had moved nearly half of its manoeuvre battalions to I Corps in anticipation of just such a battle.

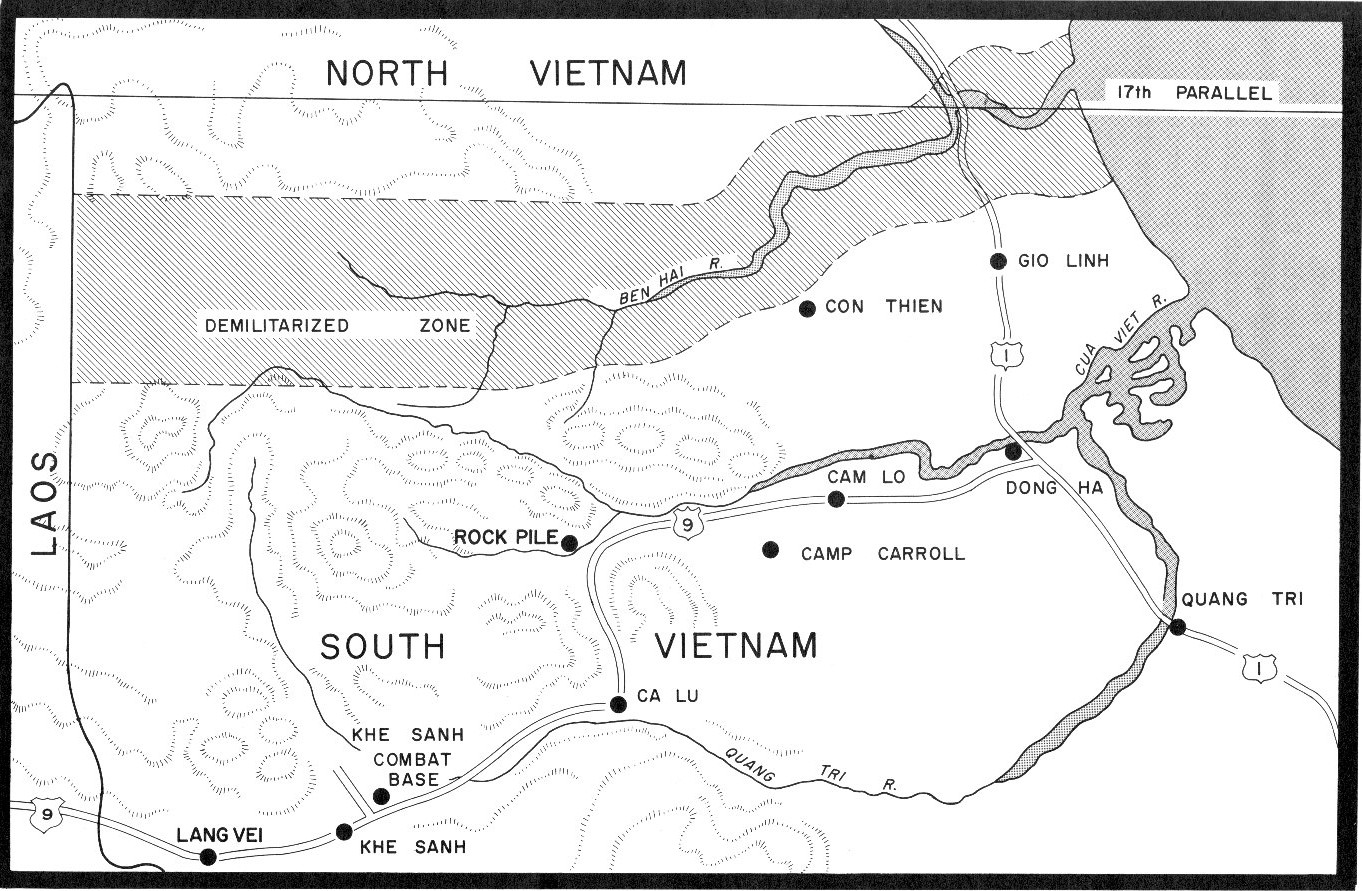
Northern Quảng Trị Province and DMZ

Westmoreland—and the American media, which covered the action extensively—often made comparisons between the actions at Khe Sanh and the Battle of Điện Biên Phủ, where a French base had been besieged and ultimately overrun by Viet Minh forces under the command of General Giáp during the First Indochina War. Westmoreland, who knew of Nguyen Chi Thanh's penchant for large-scale operations—but not of his death—believed this was going to be an attempt to replicate that victory. He intended to stage his own "Dien Bien Phu in reverse."

Khe Sanh and its 6,000 U.S. Marine Corps, Army and ARVN defenders was surrounded by two to three PAVN divisions, totaling approximately 20,000 men. Throughout the siege, which lasted until 8 April, the allies were subjected to heavy mortar, rocket, and artillery bombardment, combined with sporadic small-scale infantry attacks on outlying positions. With the exception of the overrunning of the U.S. Special Forces camp at Lang Vei, there was never a major ground assault on the base and the battle became largely a duel between American and North Vietnamese artillery, supplemented with massive air strikes conducted by U.S. aircraft. By the end of the siege, U.S. Air Force, Marine Corps, and Navy aircraft had dropped 39,179 tons of ordnance in the defense of the base.

In the end, a major allied relief expedition (Operation Pegasus) launched by all three brigades of the 1st Cavalry Division reached Khe Sanh on 8 April, but PAVN forces were already withdrawing from the area. Both sides claimed the battle had served its intended purpose. MACV estimated that 5,500 PAVN troops had been killed and considerably more wounded. During the entire battle from 1 November 1967 to 14 April 1968, 730 U.S. personnel were killed and another 2,642 wounded. Khe Sanh Base was later closed on 5 July 1968 because the base was seen as having less of a strategic importance than before.

== Aftermath ==
Except in Huế and mopping-up operations in and around Saigon, the first surge of the offensive was over by the second week of February. The U.S. estimated during the first phase (30 January – 8 April) approximately 45,000 PAVN/VC soldiers were killed and an unknown number were wounded. For years this figure has been held as excessively optimistic, as it represented more than half the forces involved in this battle. Westmoreland himself claimed a smaller number of enemies disabled, estimating that during the same period 32,000 PAVN troops were killed and another 5,800 captured. According to Max Hastings, the Tet Offensive, including the following "Mini-Tet" offensives in May and August 1968, resulted in the deaths of 50,000 VC (total casualties drained 60-70% of their strength), while US forces lost 4,000 killed and ARVN 6,000 dead.

The South Vietnamese suffered 2,788 killed, 8,299 wounded, and 587 missing in action. U.S. and other allied forces suffered 1,536 killed, 7,764 wounded, and 11 missing.

According to the best estimates by MACV intelligence officers, the combined PAVN/VC forces in South Vietnam numbered 262,000 at the end of 1967. Expansion of the forces in preparation for the Tet Offensive increased the figure to 287,000 by the end of January 1968. Both VC and PAVN forces suffered heavy losses during the following months. They were able to find replacements for some but not all of the losses, and at the end of 1968, the PAVN/VC forces had an estimated strength of 251,000.

=== North Vietnam ===
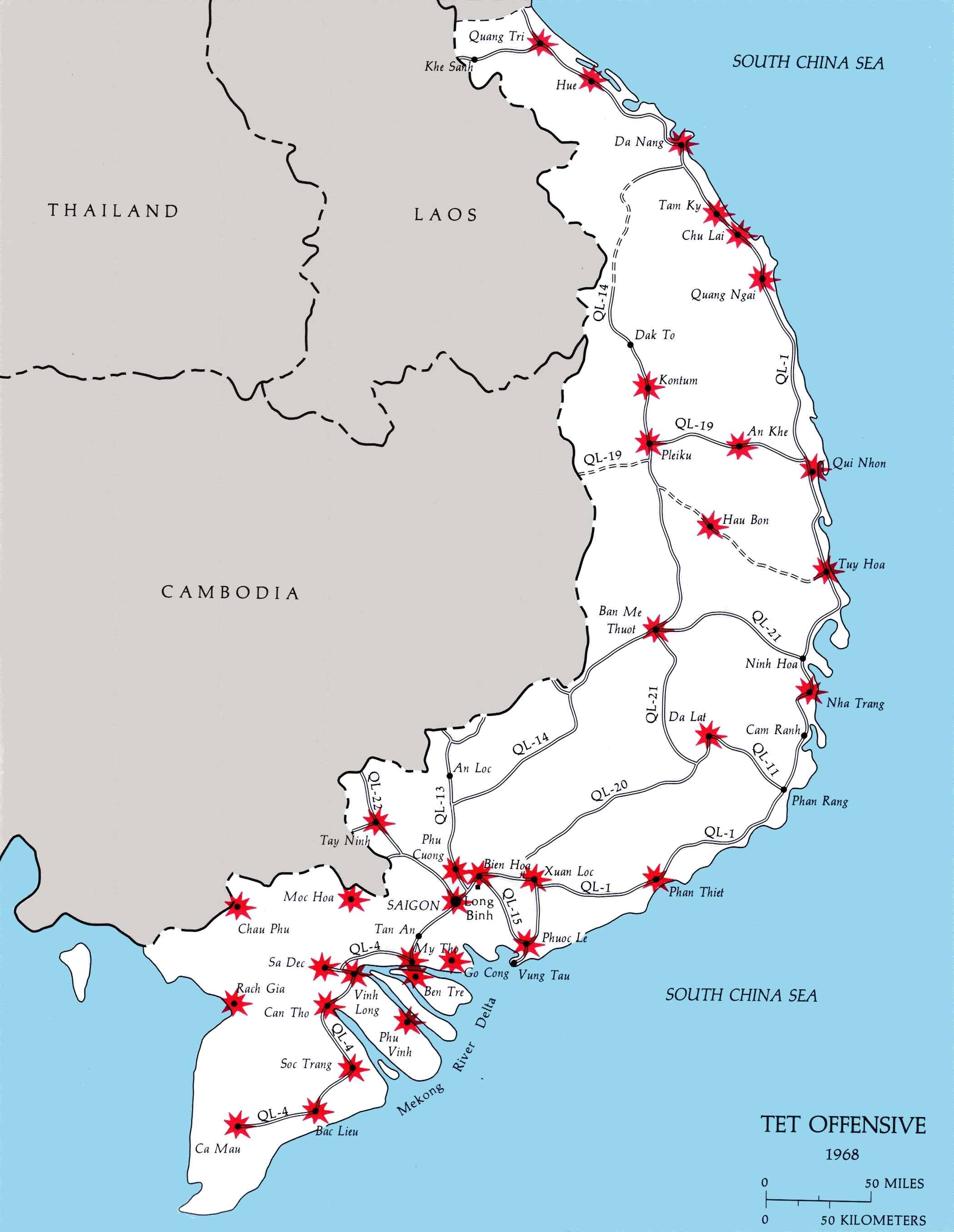
A number of South Vietnamese targets during the Tet offensive

The leadership in Hanoi was disappointed with the outcome of the offensive. Their first and most ambitious goal, producing a general uprising, was a failure. In total, about 85,000–100,000 PAVN/VC troops had participated in the initial offensive and in the follow-up phases.

According to historian James Willbanks, Hanoi underestimated the strategic mobility of the allied forces. This mobility allowed them to redeploy at will to threatened areas. The battle plan was also too complex and difficult to coordinate, which was amply demonstrated by the 30 January attacks. Hanoi's plan also violated the military principle of mass - attacking everywhere instead of concentrating their forces on a few specific targets - allowing their forces to be defeated piecemeal. When they did use mass, PAVN/VC forces launched attacks directly towards an enemy with vastly superior firepower. According to General Trần Văn Trà, VC deputy commander: "We did not correctly evaluate the specific balance of forces between ourselves and the enemy, did not fully realize that the enemy still had considerable capabilities, and that our capabilities were limited, and set requirements that were beyond our actual strength."

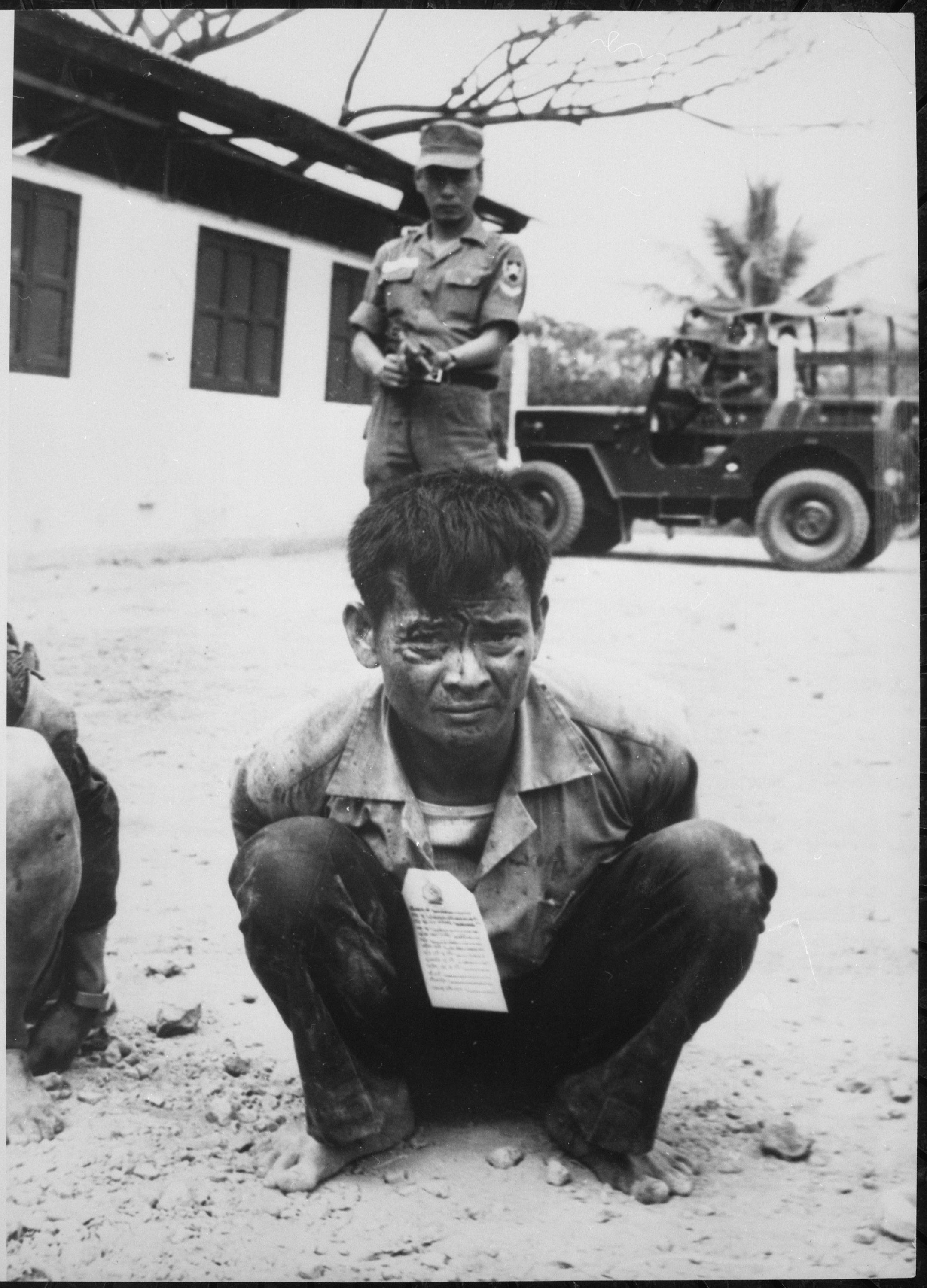
A VC guerrilla awaits interrogation following his capture in the attacks on Saigon.

The PAVN/VC effort to regain control of the countryside was somewhat more successful. According to the U.S. State Department, the VC "made pacification virtually inoperative. In the Mekong Delta, the Viet Cong was stronger now than ever and in other regions the countryside belongs to the VC." General Earle Wheeler reported that the offensive had brought counterinsurgency programs to a halt and "that to a large extent, the VC now controlled the countryside". This state of affairs did not last; heavy casualties and military operations of the South Vietnamese and Americans resulted in more territorial losses and heavy casualties.

One historian claims heavy losses inflicted on VC units struck into the heart of the infrastructure that had been built up for over a decade, claiming that 181,149 PAVN/VC troops had been killed during 1968.

Marilyn B. Young writes:

In Long An province, for example, local guerrillas taking part in the May—June offensive had been divided into several sections. Only 775 out of 2,018 in one section survived; another lost all but 640 out of 1,430. The province itself was subjected to what one historian has called a "My Lai from the Sky"—non-stop B-52 bombing.

However, according to historian Erik Villard the VC remained a viable fighting force until the end of the war.

A PRG Justice Minister who later defected, Trương Như Tảng, claimed the Tet offensive had wiped out half of the VC's strength,. Allied operations over the next few years also impacted the strength of the Viet Cong. One official Vietnamese publication states that by the end of 1969, very little communist-held territory ("liberated zones") was held. "We could not maintain the level of local recruitment we had maintained in previous years. In 1969 we were only able to recruit 1,700 new soldiers in Region 5 (compared with 8,000 in 1968), and in the lowlands of Cochin China we recruited only 100 new soldiers (compared with 16,000 in 1968)." The same source continues, "because our armed local forces had suffered severe losses, guerrilla operations had declined." However, this change had little effect on the overall result of the war, since the PAVN had little difficulty making up the casualties inflicted by the offensive. Some Western historians have come to believe that one possible motive for the campaign was the elimination of competing southern members of the Party, thereby allowing the northerners more control once the war was won. One estimate indicated that by late 1968, approximately 70% of the main force troops in the south were from North Vietnam.

It was not until after the conclusion of the first phase of the offensive that Hanoi realized that the offensive might have succeeded in some aspects. General Trần Độ, VC deputy commissar, gave some insight into how defeat was translated into victory:

In all honesty, we didn't achieve our main objective, which was to spur uprisings throughout the South. Still, we inflicted heavy casualties on the Americans and their puppets, and this was a big gain for us. As for making an impact in the United States, it had not been our intention—but it turned out to be a fortunate result.

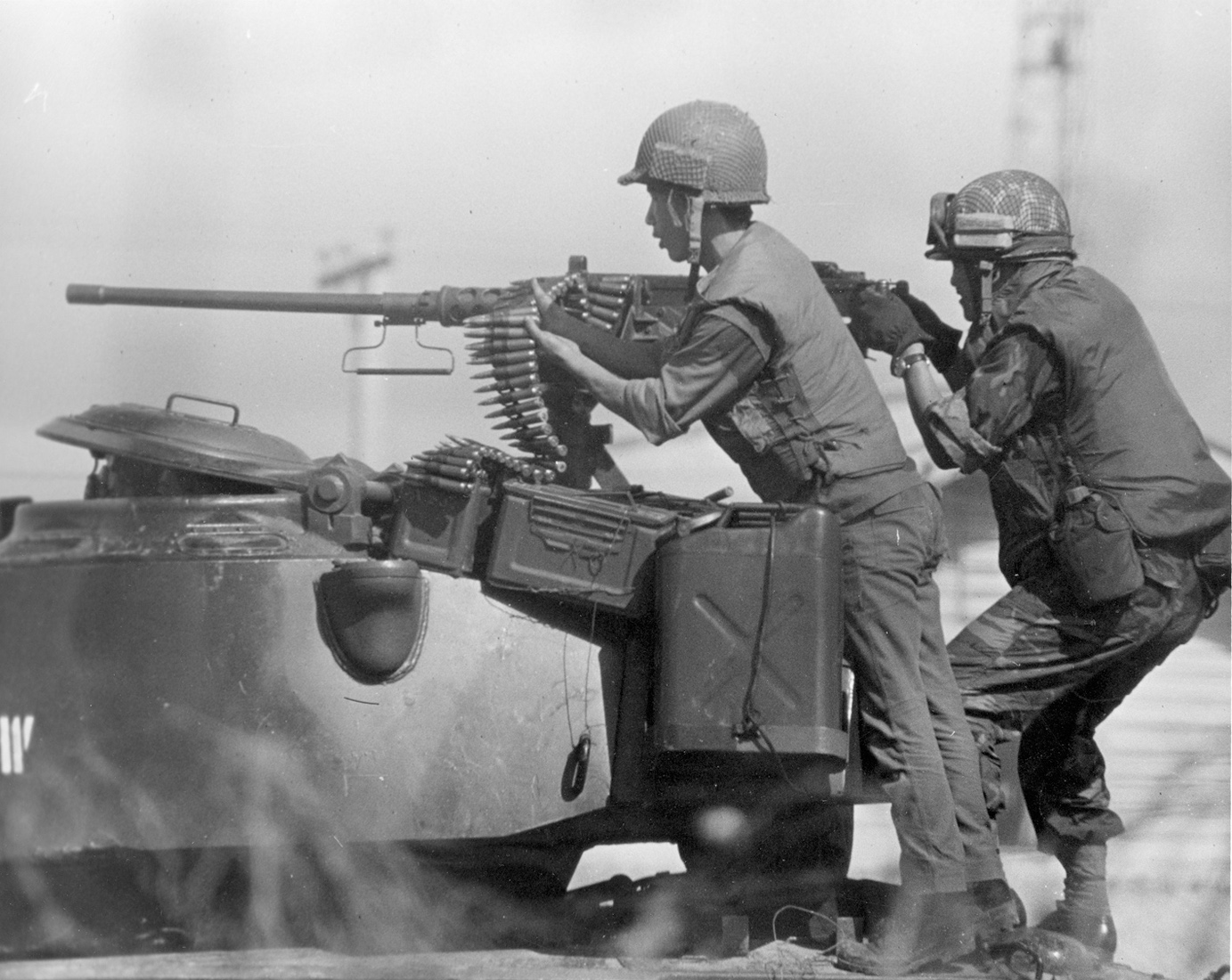
South Vietnamese troops in action near Tan Son Nhut Air Base

On 5 May, Trường Chinh rose to address a congress of Party members and proceeded to castigate the Party militants and their bid for quick victory: his "faction-bashing" tirade sparked a serious debate within the party leadership that lasted for four months. As the leader of the "main force war" and "quick victory" faction, Lê Duẩn also came under severe criticism.

In August, Chinh's report on the situation was accepted in toto, published, and broadcast via Radio Hanoi, single-handedly shifting the nation's war strategy and restoring himself to prominence as the Party's ideological conscience.

The Lê Duẩn faction, which favored quick, decisive offensives meant to paralyze South Vietnam-United States responses, was replaced by Giáp and Trường Chinh, who favored a strategy of more protracted, drawn-out warfare. High-intensity, so-called "big-unit battles" were replaced with smaller-scale, quick attack and quick withdrawal operations designed to continually put pressure on the allied forces while mechanized and combined-arms capabilities within the PAVN were being built. The plan for a popular uprising or people's war was abandoned for a greater combination of guerrilla and conventional warfare. During this period, the PAVN would undergo a significant strategic re-structuring, being built into a combined-arms capable force while applying pressure on the U.S./ARVN with lighter infantry units. In line with the revamped strategy of Hanoi, on April 5, 1969, COSVN issued Directive 55 to all of its subordinate units: "Never again and under no circumstances are we going to risk our entire military force for just such an offensive. On the contrary, we should endeavor to preserve our military potential for future campaigns."

The PAVN official history describes the first phase of the Tet offensive as a "great strategic victory" that "killed or dispersed 150,000 enemy soldiers including 43,000 Americans, destroyed 34 percent of the American war reserve supplies in Vietnam, destroyed 4,200 strategic hamlets and liberated an additional 1.4 million people."

=== South Vietnam ===
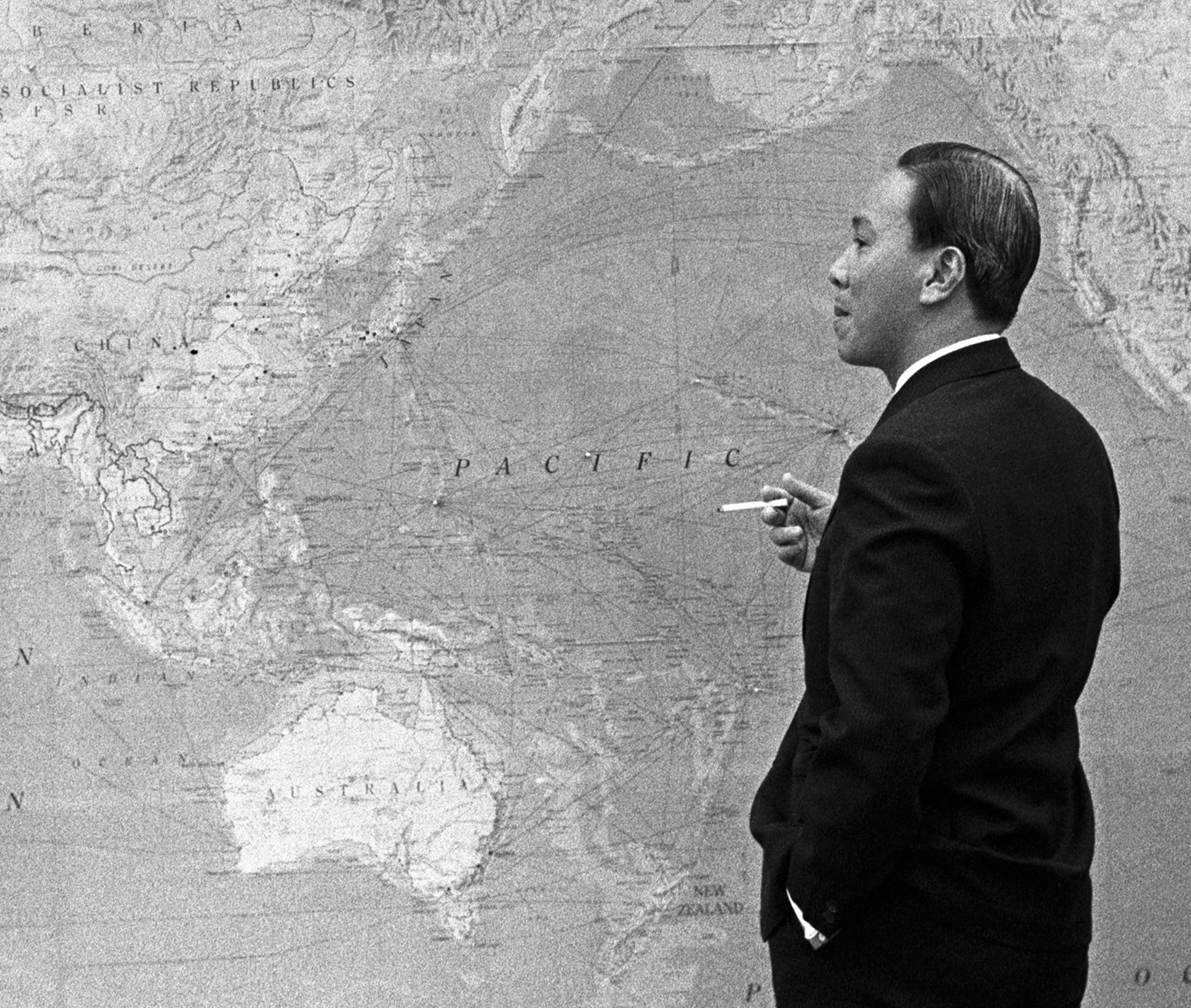
Nguyễn Văn Thiệu was the president of South Vietnam.

South Vietnam was in turmoil both during and in the aftermath of the offensive, as the conflict reached into cities for the first time. As government troops pulled back to defend urban areas, the VC moved in to fill the vacuum in the countryside. The violence and destruction witnessed during the offensive left a psychological scar on the South Vietnamese civilian population, as confidence in the government was shaken, since the offensive seemed to reveal that, even with massive American support, the government could not protect its citizens in urban areas.

A political rivalry had also re-emerged after the 1967 South Vietnamese presidential election, when the coalition between Nguyễn Văn Thiệu, and former Air Force commander and Vice President Nguyễn Cao Kỳ re-emerged. Kỳ would be sidelined by Thiệu for the duration of the war afterwards, retaining his position as Vice President.

The human and material cost to South Vietnam was significant. The number of civilian dead was estimated by the government at 14,300 with an additional 24,000 wounded. Around 630,000 new refugees had been displaced, joining the nearly 800,000 others already displaced by the war. By the end of 1968, one of every twelve South Vietnamese was living in a refugee camp. More than 70,000 homes had been destroyed in the fighting and perhaps 30,000 more were heavily damaged and the nation's infrastructure had been virtually destroyed. The South Vietnamese military, although it had performed better than the Americans had expected, suffered from lowered morale, with desertion rates rising from 10.5 per thousand before Tet to 16.5 per thousand by July. 1968 became the deadliest year of the war to date for the ARVN with 27,915 men killed.

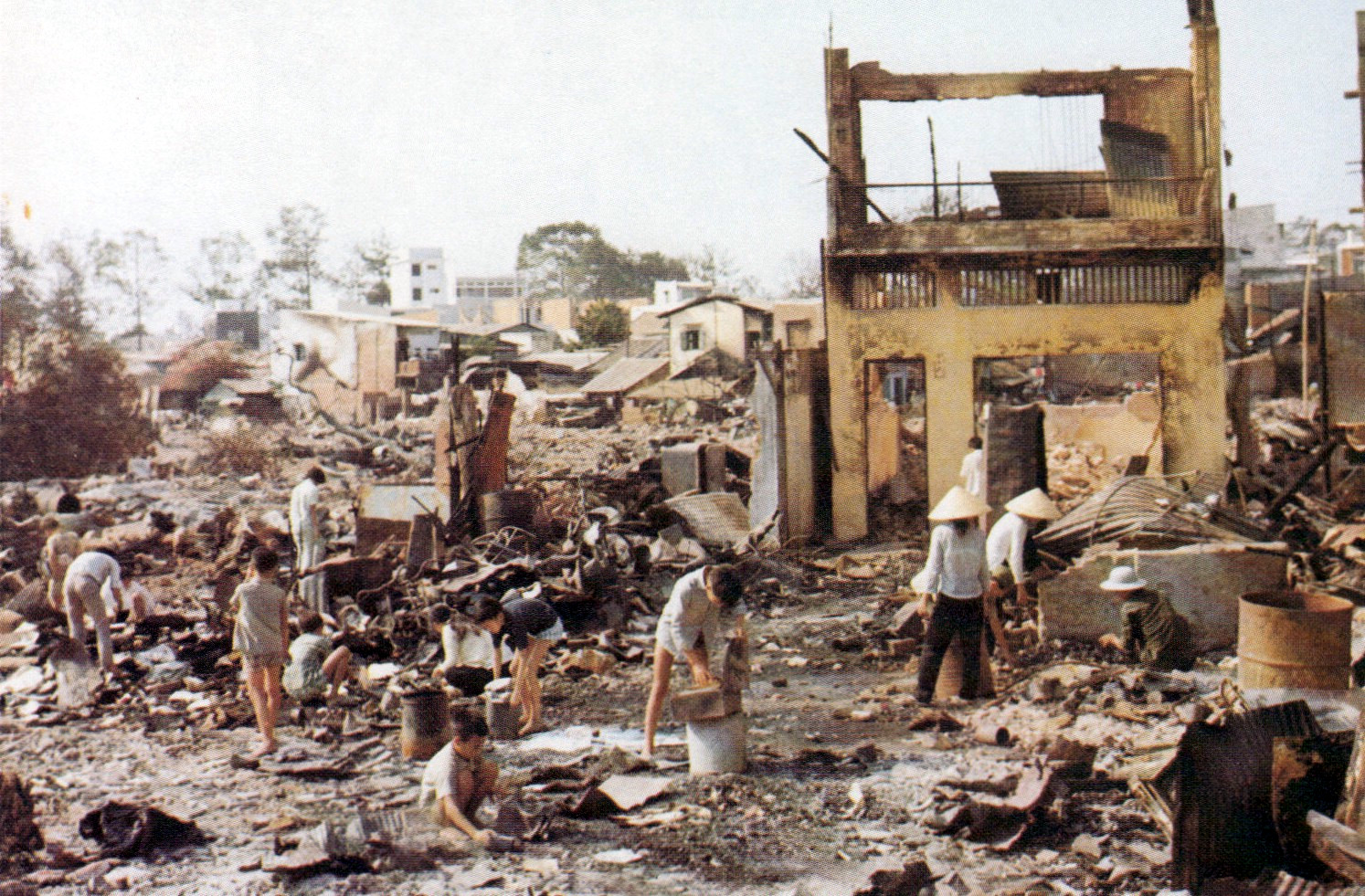
Civilians sort through the ruins of their homes in Cholon, the heavily damaged Chinese section of Saigon.

In the wake of the offensive, however, fresh determination was exhibited by the Thiệu government. On 1 February Thiệu declared a state of martial law, and on 15 June the National Assembly passed his request for a general mobilization of the population and the induction of 200,000 draftees into the armed forces by the end of the year (a decree that had failed to pass only five months previously). This would bring South Vietnam's troop strength to more than 900,000 men. Military mobilization, anti-corruption campaigns, demonstrations of political unity, and administrative reforms were quickly carried out. Thiệu also established a National Recovery Committee to oversee food distribution, resettlement, and housing construction for the new refugees. Both the government and the Americans were encouraged by a new determination exhibited by the ordinary citizens of South Vietnam. Many urban dwellers were indignant that the communists had launched their attacks during Tet, and it drove many who had been previously apathetic into active support of the government. Journalists, political figures, and religious leaders alike—even the militant Buddhists—professed confidence in the government's plans.

Thiệu saw an opportunity to consolidate his personal power and he took it. His only real political rival was Kỳ, who had been outmaneuvered by Thiệu in the presidential election of 1967. In the aftermath of Tet, Kỳ supporters in the military and the administration were quickly removed from power, arrested, or exiled. A crack-down on the South Vietnamese press also ensued and there was a worrisome return of former President Ngô Đình Diệm's Cần Lao Party members to high positions in the government and military. By the summer of 1968, Thiệu had earned a less exalted sobriquet among the South Vietnamese population, who had begun to call him "the little dictator."

Thiệu had also become very suspicious of his American allies, unwilling to believe (as did many South Vietnamese) that the U.S. had been caught by surprise by the offensive. "Now that it's all over", he queried a visiting Washington official, "you really knew it was coming, didn't you?" Johnson's unilateral decision on 31 March to curtail the bombing of North Vietnam only confirmed what Thiệu already feared, that the Americans were going to abandon South Vietnam to the communists. For Thiệu, the bombing halt and the beginning of negotiations with the North brought not the hope of an end to the war, but "an abiding fear of peace." He was only mollified after an 18 July meeting with Johnson in Honolulu, where Johnson affirmed that Saigon would be a full partner in all negotiations and that the U.S. would not "support the imposition of a coalition government, or any other form of government, on the people of South Vietnam."

=== United States ===
The Tet Offensive created a crisis within the Johnson administration, which became increasingly unable to convince the American public that it had been a major defeat for the communists. The optimistic assessments made before the offensive by the administration and the Pentagon came under heavy criticism and ridicule as the "credibility gap" that had opened in 1967 widened into a chasm.

At the time of the Tet Offensive, the majority of the American public felt the war was not being won by the United States and its allies, despite assurances from the President and military leaders to the contrary. Even if the PAVN/VC lost about 30,000 of their best troops in the fighting at Tet, they were capable of making up the losses with replacements from North Vietnam. In 1969, the year after the Tet battles, the US suffered 11,780 killed, the second highest annual total in the war. This was a clear indication that the North Vietnamese were capable of ongoing offensive actions, despite their losses at Tet. Most Americans were tired of suffering so many casualties without evidence they were going to stop anytime in the foreseeable future. Walter Cronkite, anchorman of the CBS Evening News, argued for negotiations as an honorable way out in a Special Report based on his journalism in Vietnam broadcast on CBS TV in March.

The shocks that reverberated from the battlefield continued to widen: On 18 February 1968 MACV posted the highest U.S. casualty figures for a single week during the entire war: 543 killed and 2,547 wounded. As a result of the heavy fighting, 1968 went on to become the deadliest year of the war for the US forces with 16,592 soldiers killed. On 23 February the U.S. Selective Service System announced a new draft call for 48,000 men, the second highest of the war. On 28 February Robert S. McNamara, the Secretary of Defense who had overseen the escalation of the war in 1964–1965, but who had eventually turned against it, stepped down from office.

==== Troop request ====
During the first two weeks of February, Westmoreland and Wheeler exchanged messages regarding the necessity for reinforcements or troop increases in Vietnam. Westmoreland insisted he only needed those forces either in-country or already scheduled for deployment and he was puzzled by the sense of unwarranted urgency in Wheeler's queries. Westmoreland was tempted, however, when Wheeler emphasized that the White House might loosen restraints and allow operations in Laos, Cambodia, or possibly even North Vietnam itself. On 8 February, Westmoreland responded he could use another division "if operations in Laos are authorized". Wheeler responded by challenging Westmoreland's assessment of the situation, pointing out dangers that his on-the-spot commander did not consider palpable, concluding: "In summary, if you need more troops, ask for them."

Wheeler's promptings were influenced by the severe strain imposed upon the U.S. military by the Vietnam commitment, which had been undertaken without mobilizing its reserve forces. The Joint Chiefs had repeatedly requested national mobilization, not only to prepare for a possible intensification of the war but also to ensure that the nation's strategic reserve did not become depleted. By obliquely ordering Westmoreland to demand more forces, Wheeler was attempting to solve two pressing problems. In comparison with MACV's previous communications, which had been full of confidence, optimism, and resolve, Westmoreland's 12 February request for 10,500 troops was much more urgent: "which I desperately need ... time is of the essence". On 13 February, 10,500 previously authorized U.S. airborne troops and marines were dispatched to South Vietnam. The Joint Chiefs then played their hand, advising Johnson to turn down MACV's requested division-sized reinforcement unless he called up some 1,234,001 marine and army reservists.

Johnson dispatched Wheeler to Saigon on 20 February to determine military requirements in response to the offensive. Both Wheeler and Westmoreland were elated that McNamara would be replaced by the hawkish Clark Clifford in only eight days and that the military might finally obtain permission to widen the war. Wheeler's written report of the trip, however, contained no mention of any new contingencies, strategies, or the building up of the strategic reserve. It was couched in grave language that suggested that the 206,756-man request it proposed was a matter of vital military necessity. Westmoreland wrote in his memoir that Wheeler had deliberately concealed the truth of the matter to force the issue of the strategic reserve upon the President.

On 27 February, Johnson and McNamara discussed the proposed troop increase. To fulfil it would require an increase in the overall military strength of about 400,000 men and the expenditure of an additional $10 billion during fiscal 1969 and another $15 billion in 1970. These monetary concerns were pressing. Throughout the fall of 1967 and the spring of 1968, the U.S. was struggling with "one of the most severe monetary crises" of the period. Without a new tax bill and budgetary cuts, the nation would face even higher inflation "and the possible collapse of the monetary system". Johnson's friend Clifford was concerned about what the American public would think of the escalation: "How do we avoid creating the feeling that we are pounding troops down a rathole?"

According to the Pentagon Papers, "A fork in the road had been reached and the alternatives stood out in stark reality." To meet Wheeler's request would mean a total U.S. military commitment to South Vietnam. "To deny it, or to attempt to cut it to a size which could be sustained by the thinly stretched active forces, would just as surely signify that an upper limit to the U.S. military commitment in South Vietnam had been reached."

==== Reassessment ====
Westmoreland reported that defeating the PAVN/VC would require 200,000 more American soldiers and activation of the reserves, prompting even loyal supporters of the war to admit that the current war strategy required reevaluation.

To evaluate Westmoreland's request and its possible impact on domestic politics, Johnson convened the "Clifford Group" on 28 February and tasked its members with a complete policy reassessment. Some of the members argued that the offensive represented an opportunity to defeat the North Vietnamese on American terms while others pointed out that neither side could win militarily, that North Vietnam could match any troop increase, that the bombing of the North is halted, and that a change in strategy was required that would seek not victory, but the staying power required to reach a negotiated settlement. This would require a less aggressive strategy that was designed to protect the population of South Vietnam. The divided group's final report, issued on 4 March, "failed to seize the opportunity to change directions... and seemed to recommend that we continue rather haltingly down the same road."

On 1 March, Clifford succeeded McNamara as Secretary of Defense. During the month, Clifford, who had entered office as a staunch supporter of the Vietnam commitment and who had opposed McNamara's de-escalatory views, turned against the war. According to Clifford: "The simple truth was that the military failed to sustain a respectable argument for their position." Between the results of Tet and the meetings of the group that bore his name, he became convinced that de-escalation was the only solution for the United States. He believed that the troop increase would lead only to a more violent stalemate and sought out others in the administration to assist him in convincing the President to reverse the escalation, cap force levels at 550,000 men, seek negotiations with Hanoi, and turn responsibility for the fighting over to the South Vietnamese. Clifford quietly sought allies and was assisted in his effort by the so-called "8:30 Group"—Nitze, Warnke, Phil G. Goulding (Assistant Secretary of Defense for Public Affairs), George Elsey and Air Force Colonel Robert E. Pursely.

On 27 February, Secretary of State Dean Rusk proposed that a partial bombing halt be implemented in North Vietnam and that an offer to negotiate be extended to Hanoi. On 4 March, Rusk reiterated the proposal, explaining that, during the rainy season in the North, the bombing was less effective and that no military sacrifice would thus occur. This was purely a political ploy, however, since the North Vietnamese would probably again refuse to negotiate, casting the onus on them and "thus freeing our hand after a short period...putting the monkey firmly upon Hanoi's back for what was to follow."

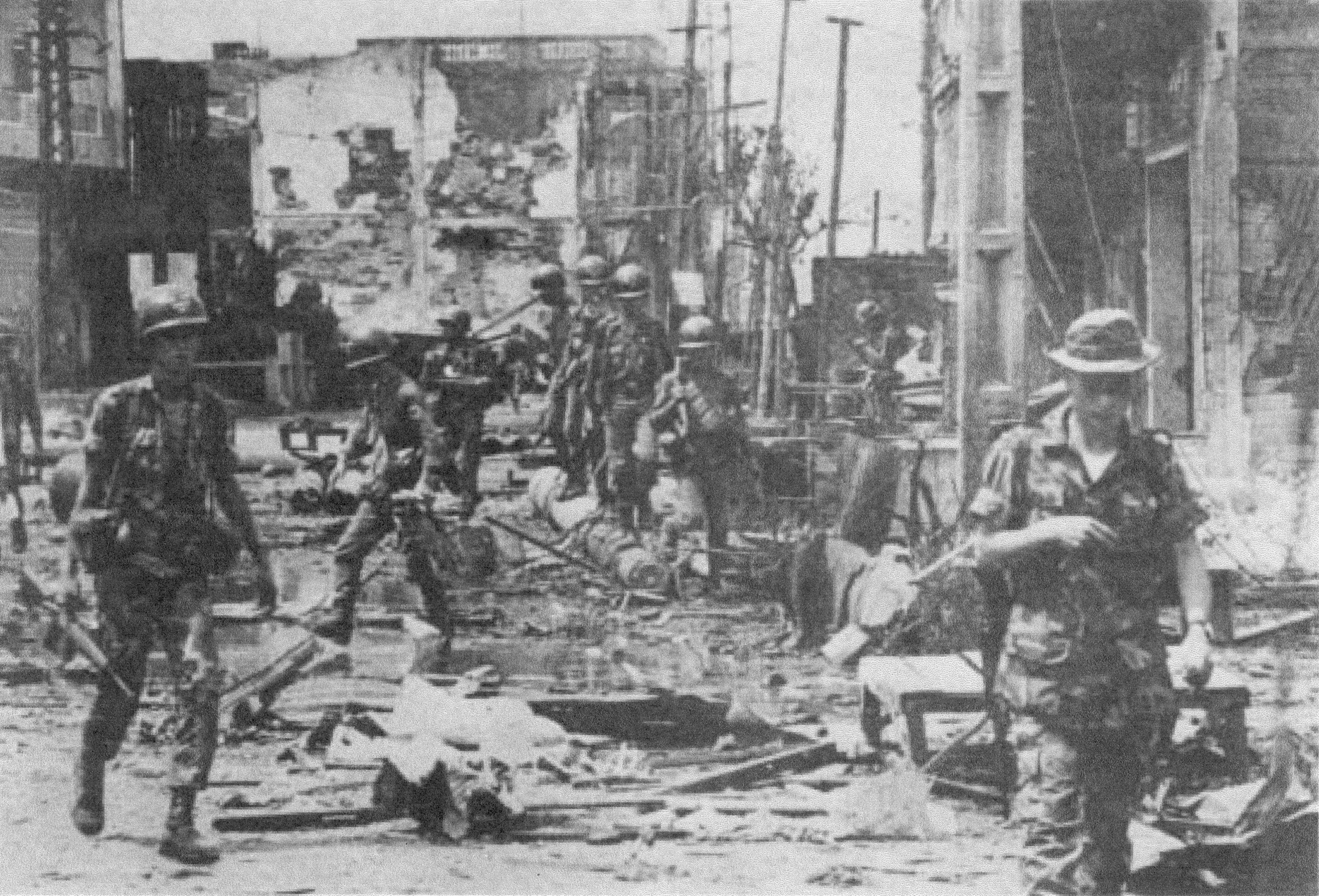
ARVN Rangers moving through western Cholon, Saigon, 10 May 1968

While this was being deliberated, the troop request was leaked to the press and published in The New York Times on 10 March. The article also revealed that the request had begun a serious debate within the administration. According to it, many high-level officials believed that the U.S. troop increase would be matched by the communists and would simply maintain a stalemate at a higher level of violence. It went on to state that officials were saying in private that "widespread and deep changes in attitudes, a sense that a watershed has been reached."

A great deal has been said by historians concerning how the news media made Tet the "turning point" in the public's perception of the war. Popular CBS anchor Walter Cronkite stated during a news broadcast on February 27, "We have been too often disappointed by the optimism of the American leaders, both in Vietnam and Washington, to have faith any longer in the silver linings they find in the darkest clouds" and added that, "we are mired in a stalemate that could only be ended by negotiation, not victory." Far from suffering a loss of morale, however, the majority of Americans had rallied to the side of the president. A Gallup poll in January 1968 revealed that 56 per cent polled considered themselves hawks on the war and 27 per cent doves, with 17 per cent offering no opinion. By early February, at the height of the offensive's first phase, 61 per cent declared themselves hawks, 23 per cent doves, and 16 per cent held no opinion.

Johnson, however, made few comments to the press during or immediately after the offensive, leaving an impression of indecision on the public, and it was this lack of communication that caused a collapse in his approval rating for his conduct of the war: by the end of February, his approval rating had fallen from 63 percent to 47 percent. By the end of March, the percentage of Americans that expressed confidence in U.S. military policies in Southeast Asia had fallen from 74 percent to 54 percent.

By 22 March, Johnson had informed Kentrell to "forget the 100,000" men. The President and his staff were refining a lesser version of the troop increase—a planned call-up of 62,000 reservists, 13,000 of whom would be sent to Vietnam. Three days later, at Clifford's suggestion, Johnson called a conclave of the "Wise Men". (Note: The group consisted of Dean Acheson (former Secretary of State), George W. Ball (former Under Secretary of State), General Omar N. Bradley, Arthur H. Dean, Douglas Dillon, (former Secretary of State and the Treasury), Associate Justice Abe Fortas, Henry Cabot Lodge (twice Ambassador to South Vietnam), John J. McCloy (former High Commissioner of West Germany), Robert D. Murphy (former diplomat), General Taylor, General Matthew B. Ridgeway (U.S. Commander in the Korean War), and Cyrus Vance (former Secretary of Defense), and Arthur J. Goldberg (U.S. representative at the UN).) With few exceptions, all of the members of the group had formerly been accounted as hawks on the war. The group was joined by Rusk, Wheeler, Bundy, Rostow and Clifford. The final assessment of the majority stupefied the group. According to Clifford, "few of them were thinking solely of Vietnam anymore". All but four members called for disengagement from the war, leaving the President "deeply shaken." According to the Pentagon Papers, the advice of the group was decisive in convincing Johnson to reduce the bombing of North Vietnam.

Johnson was depressed and despondent in the course of recent events: the New York Times article had been released just two days before the Democratic Party's New Hampshire primary, where Johnson suffered an unexpected setback, finishing barely ahead of Senator Eugene McCarthy. Soon afterwards, Senator Robert F. Kennedy announced he would join the contest for the Democratic nomination, further emphasizing the plummeting support for Johnson's administration in the wake of Tet.

Johnson was to make a televised address to the nation on Vietnam policy on 31 March and was deliberating on both the troop request and his response to the military situation. By 28 March Clifford was working with Johnson to convince him to tone down his hard-line speech, maintain force levels at their present size, and institute Rusk's bombing/negotiating proposal. To Clifford's surprise, both Rusk and Rostow (both of whom had previously been opposed to any form of de-escalation) offered no opposition to Clifford's suggestions. On 31 March, Johnson announced the unilateral (although still partial) bombing halt during his television address, then stunned the nation by declining to run for a second term in office. To Washington's surprise, on 3 April Hanoi announced that it would conduct negotiations, which were scheduled to begin on 13 May in Paris.

On 9 June, Johnson replaced Westmoreland as commander of MACV with General Creighton W. Abrams. Although the decision had been made in December 1967 and Westmoreland was made Army Chief of Staff, many saw his relief as punishment for the entire Tet debacle. Abrams' new strategy was quickly demonstrated by the closure of the Khe Sanh combat base and the ending of multi-division "search and destroy" operations (although major combat operations did continue during Abrams' time in command), along with discussions of victory over North Vietnam. Abrams' new "One War" policy centered the American effort on the takeover of the fighting by the South Vietnamese (through Vietnamization), the pacification of the countryside, and the destruction of communist logistics. The new administration of President Richard M. Nixon would oversee the withdrawal of U.S. forces and the continuation of negotiations.

=== Phase II ===
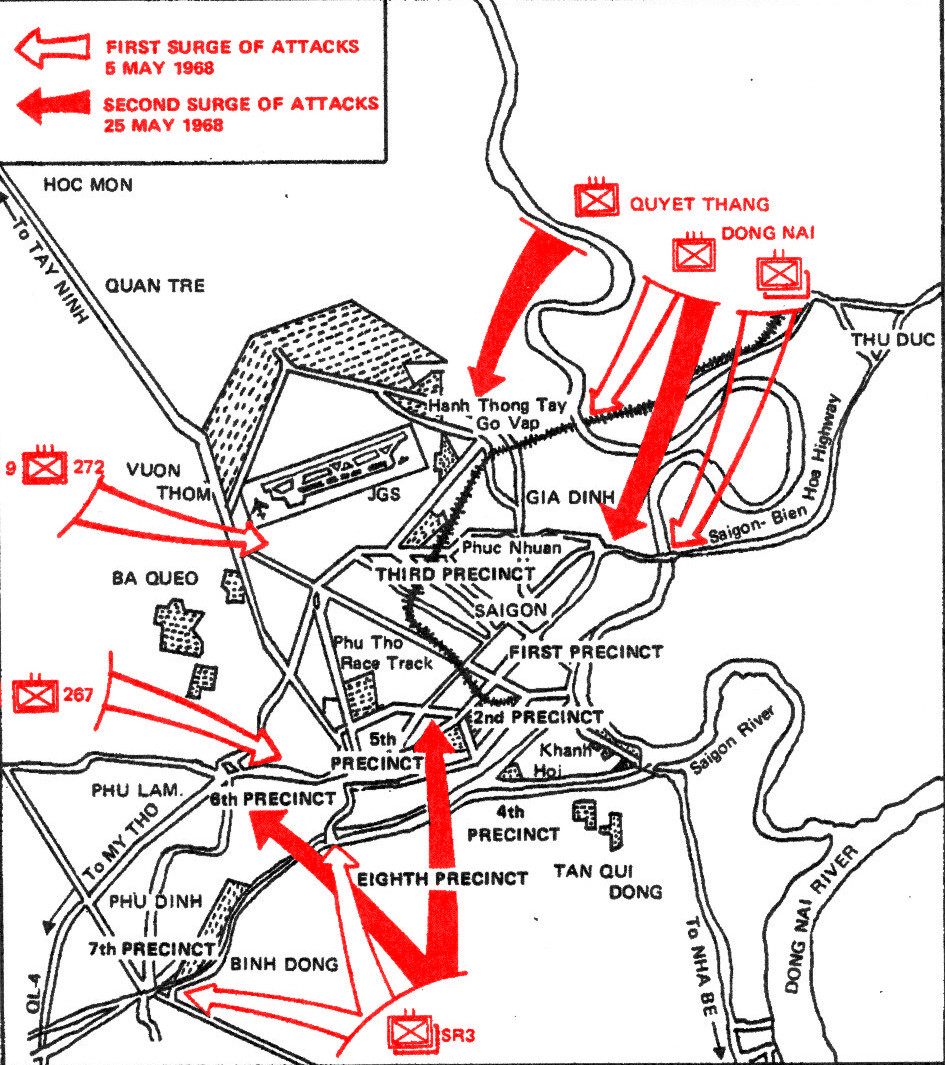
Attacks on Saigon, Phase II, May 1968

To further enhance their political position at the Paris talks, which opened on 13 May, the North Vietnamese opened the second phase of the general offensive in late April. U.S. intelligence sources estimated between February and May the North Vietnamese moved 50,000 men down the Ho Chi Minh trail to replace losses incurred during the earlier fighting. Some of the most prolonged and vicious combat of the war opened on 29 April and lasted until 30 May when the 8,000 men of the PAVN 320th Division, backed by artillery from across the DMZ, threatened the U.S. logistical base at Đông Hà, in northwestern Quảng Trị Province. In what became known as the Battle of Dai Do, the PAVN clashed savagely with U.S. Marine, Army and ARVN forces before withdrawing. The PAVN lost an estimated 2,100 men according to US/ARVN claims, after inflicting casualties on the allies of 290 killed and 946 wounded.

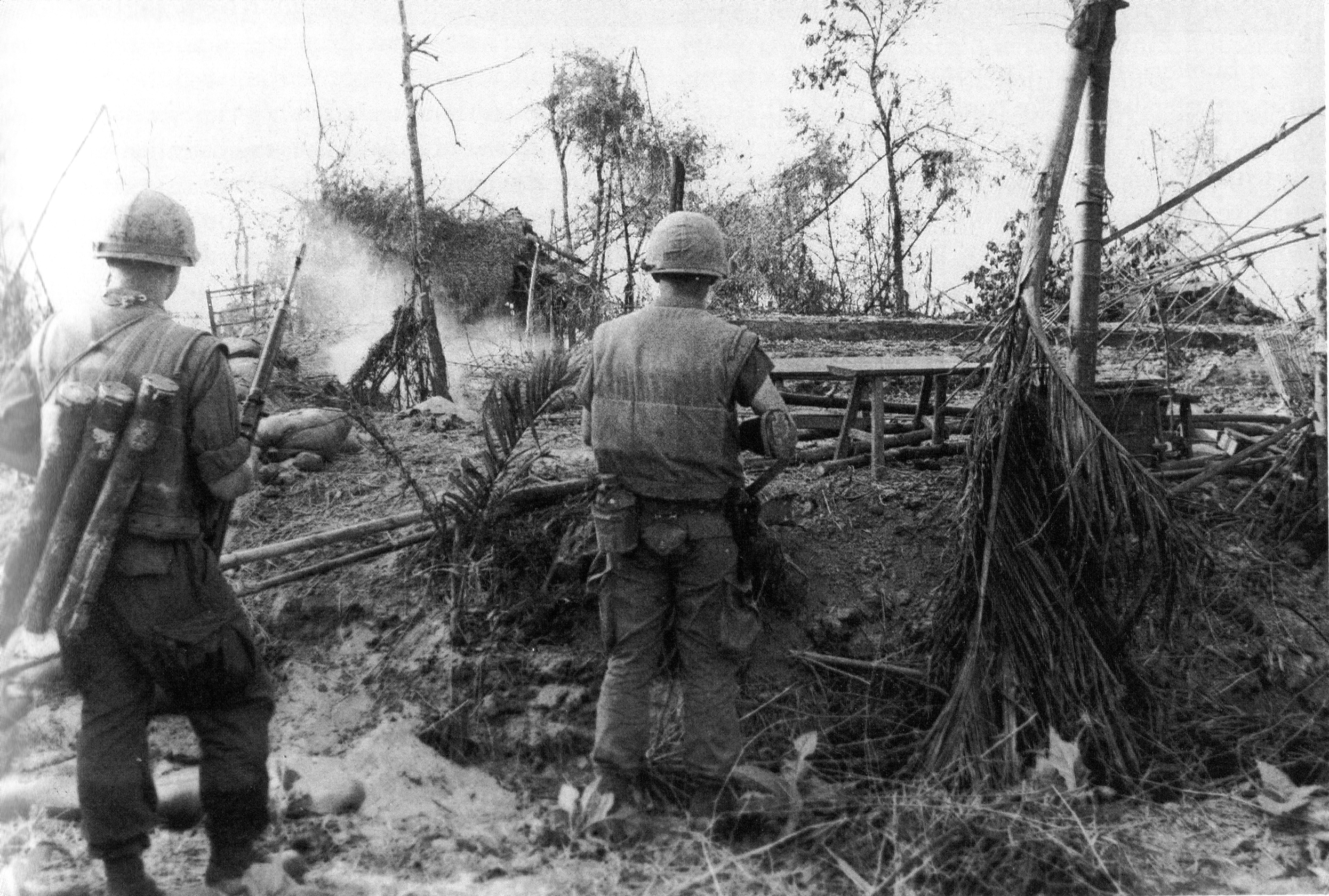
U.S. Marines move through the ruins of the hamlet of Dai Do after several days of intense fighting.

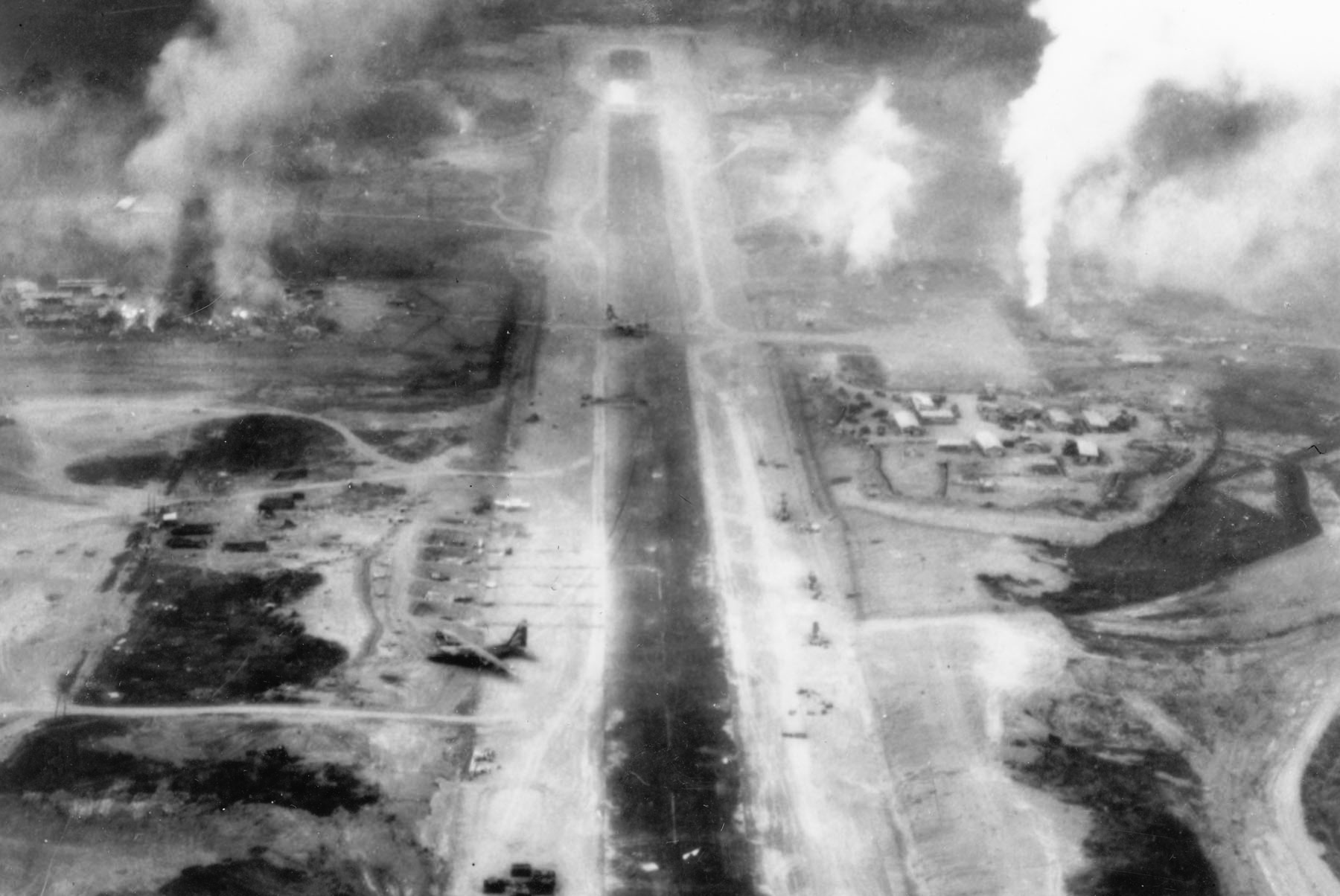
Kham Duc during the evacuation

During the early morning hours of 4 May, PAVN/VC units initiated the second phase of the offensive (known by the South Vietnamese and Americans as "Mini-Tet") by striking 119 targets throughout South Vietnam. This time, however, allied intelligence was better prepared, stripping away the element of surprise. Most of the communist forces were intercepted by allied screening elements before they reached their targets. 13 VC battalions, however, managed to slip through the cordon and once again plunged the capital into chaos. Severe fighting occurred at Phu Lam, (where it took two days to root out the VC 267th Local Force Battalion), around the Y-Bridge and at Tan Son Nhut. By 12 May, however, it was all over. VC forces withdrew from the area leaving behind over 3,000 dead.

The fighting had no sooner died down around Saigon than U.S. forces in Quảng Tín Province suffered a defeat when the PAVN 2nd Division attacked Kham Duc, the last Special Forces border surveillance camp in I Corps. 1,800 U.S. and ARVN troops were isolated and under intense attack when MACV made the decision to avoid a situation reminiscent of that at Khe Sanh. Kham Duc was evacuated by air while under fire and abandoned to the North Vietnamese.

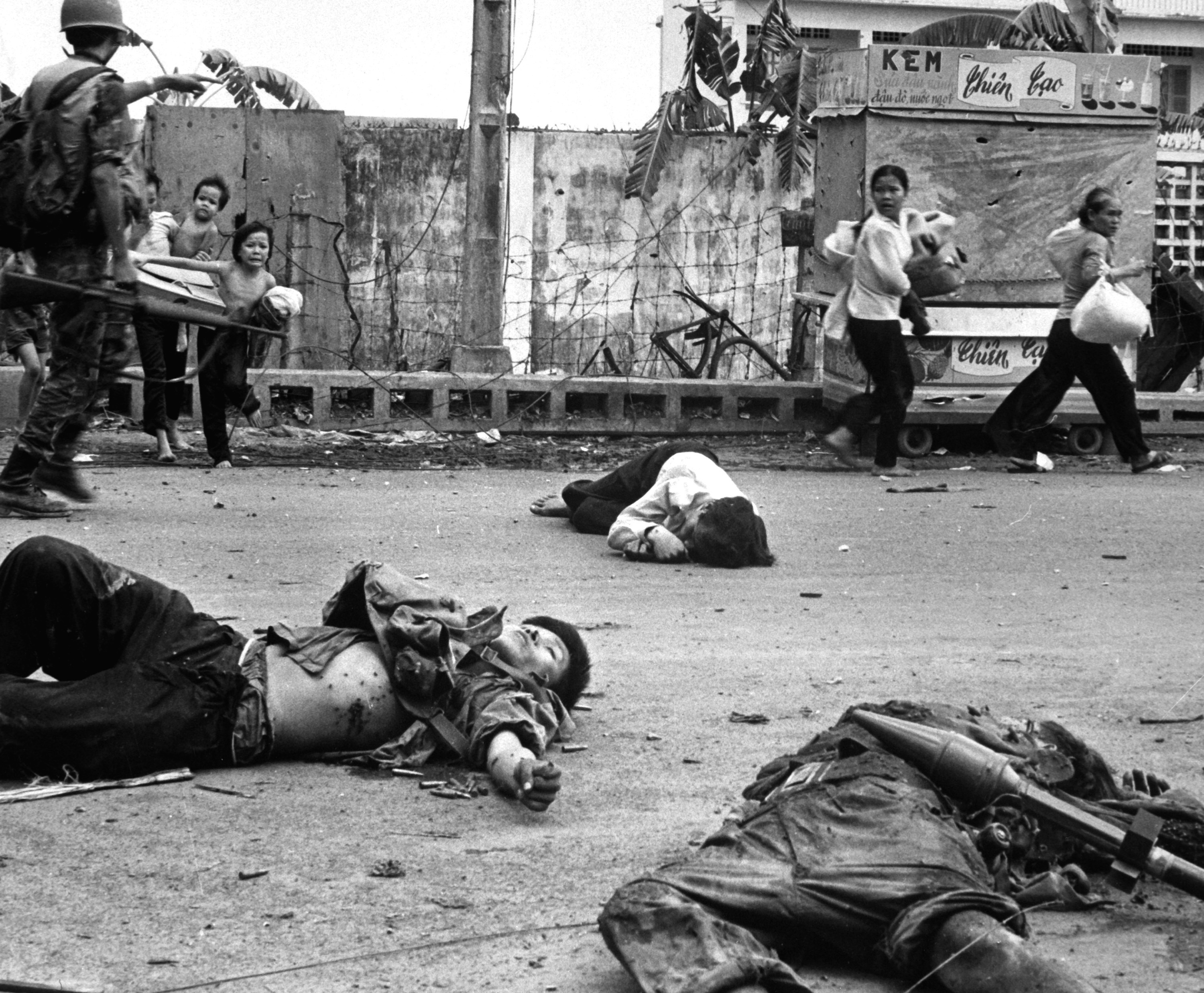
Vietcong killed in Mini-Tet

The PAVN/VC returned to Saigon on 25 May and launched a second wave of attacks on the city. The fighting during this phase differed from Tet Mau Than and "Mini-Tet" as no U.S. installations were attacked. Instead, VC forces occupied six Buddhist pagodas in the mistaken belief they would be immune from artillery and air attack. The fiercest fighting once again took place in Cholon. One notable event occurred on 18 June when 152 members of the VC Quyet Thang Regiment surrendered to ARVN forces, the largest communist surrender of the war. The attacks also brought more death and suffering to the city's inhabitants. A further 87,000 were made homeless while more than 500 were killed and another 4,500 were wounded. During part of the second phase (5 May – 30 May) U.S. casualties amounted to 1,161 killed and 3,954 wounded,

=== Phase III ===
Phase III of the offensive began on 17 August and involved attacks in I, II and III Corps. During this phase only North Vietnamese forces participated and targets were mostly military in nature. The main offensive was preceded by attacks on the border towns of Tây Ninh, An Lộc, and Loc Ninh, which were again intended to draw defensive forces from the cities. A thrust against Da Nang was preempted by the U.S. Marines' Operation Allen Brook. Continuing their border-clearing operations, three PAVN regiments asserted heavy pressure on the U.S. Special Forces camp at Bu Prang, in Quang Duc Province, five kilometers from the Cambodian border. The fighting lasted for two days before the PAVN broke contact; the combat resulted in US/ARVN claiming 776 PAVN/VC casualties, 114 South Vietnamese and two Americans.

Saigon was struck again during this phase, but the attacks were less sustained and once again repulsed. As far as MACV was concerned, the August offensive "was a dismal failure". In five weeks of fighting and after the loss of 20,000 troops, the previous objectives of spurring an uprising and mass-defection had not been attained during this "final and decisive phase". However, as argued by the historian Ronald H. Spector, "the communist failures were not final or decisive either".

The significant casualties and suffering endured by PAVN/VC units during these sustained operations were beginning to have a wider effect. The apparent lack of military gains that might have justified the casualties and effort exacerbated the situation. During the first half of 1969, more than 20,000 PAVN/VC troops defected to allied forces, a threefold increase over the 1968 figure.

== See also ==
- Tet 1969
- VC and PAVN battle tactics, after Tet

== Bibliography ==
- Hammond, William H. (1988). The United States Army in Vietnam, Public Affairs: The Military and the Media, 1962–1968. Washington, D.C.: United States Army Center of Military History.
- Hoang Ngoc Lung (1978). The General Offensives of 1968–69. McLean VA: General Research Corporation.
- Military History Institute of Vietnam (2002). Victory in Vietnam: A History of the People's Army of Vietnam, 1954–1975. trans. Pribbenow, Merle. Lawrence KS: University of Kansas Press. ISBN 0-7006-1175-4.
- Shulimson, Jack; Blaisol, Leonard; Smith, Charles R.; Dawson, David (1997). The U.S. Marines in Vietnam: 1968, the Decisive Year (PDF). History and Museums Division, United States Marine Corps. ISBN 0-16-049125-8. Archived from the original (PDF) on 12 June 2019. This article incorporates text from this source, which is in the public domain.
- Shore, Moyars S., III (1969). The Battle of Khe Sanh. Washington, D.C.: U.S. Marine Corps Historical Branch. Part 1 Archived 28 December 2016 at the Wayback Machine, Part 2 Archived 31 January 2017 at the Wayback Machine
- Vietnam: History of the Bulwark B2 Theater, Volume 5: Concluding the 30 Years War. Southeast Asia Report No. 1247 Archived July 10, 2019, at the Wayback Machine, Washington, D.C.; Foreign Broadcast Information Service; 1983

=== Primary sources ===
- The 1968 Battles of Quang Tri City& Hue, US Army Center for Military History
- CIA: Intelligence Warning of the Tet Offensive in South Vietnam; An Interim Study Archived April 17, 2016, at the Wayback Machine; April 8, 1968
- The History of the Joint Chiefs of Staff; The Joint Chiefs of Staff and the War in Vietnam 1960–68, Part 2, Section 48
- Library of Congress Country Studies: Vietnam & The Tet Offensive. 1987
- MILESTONES: 1961–1968, U.S. Involvement in the Vietnam War: The Tet Offensive, 1968
- Sheehan, Neil; Smith, Hedrick; Kenworthy, E. W.; Butterfield, Fox (1971). The Pentagon Papers. New York: Bantam.
- Vietnam January–August 1968, Foreign Relations Series

=== Historiography and memory ===
- Ang Cheng Guan (July 1998). "Decision-making Leading to the Tet Offensive (1968) – The Vietnamese Communist Perspective". Journal of Contemporary History. 33 (3).
- Arnold, James R. (1990). The Tet Offensive 1968. Westport, Connecticut: Praeger. ISBN 0-275-98452-4.
- Blood, Jake (2005). The Tet Effect: Intelligence and the Public Perception of War (Cass Military Studies). Routledge. ISBN 0-415-34997-4.
- Braestrup, Peter (1983). Big Story: How the American Press and Television Reported and Interpreted the Crisis of Tet in Vietnam and Washington. New Haven CT: Yale University Press. ISBN 0-300-02953-5.
- Bui Diem; Chanoff, David (1999). In the Jaws of History. Bloomington IN: Indiana University Press. ISBN 0-253-21301-0.
- Bui Tin (2002). From Enemy to Friend: A North Vietnamese Perspective on the War. Annapolis MD: Naval Institute Press. ISBN 1-55750-881-X.
- Clifford, Clark; Holbrooke, Richard (1991). Counsel to the President: A Memoir. New York: Random House. ISBN 0-394-56995-4.
- Hastings, Max (2018). Vietnam: An Epic Tragedy, 1945-1975. New York: Harper. ISBN 978-0062405661.
- Davidson, Phillip (1988). Vietnam at War: The History, 1946–1975. Novato CA: Presidio Press. ISBN 0-89141-306-5.
- Dougan, Clark; Weiss, Stephen; et al. (1983). Nineteen Sixty-Eight. Boston: Boston Publishing Company. ISBN 0-939526-06-9.
- Doyle, Edward; Lipsman, Samuel; Maitland, Terrance; et al. (1986). The North. Boston: Boston Publishing Company. ISBN 0-939526-21-2.
- Duiker, William J. (1996). The Communist Road to Power in Vietnam. Boulder CO: Westview Press. ISBN 0-8133-8587-3.
- Elliot, David (2003). The Vietnamese War: Revolution and Social Change in the Mekong Delta, 1930–1975. 2 vols. Armonk NY: M. E. Sharpe. ISBN 0-7656-0602-X.
- Gilbert, Marc J.; Head, William, eds. (1996). The Tet Offensive. Westport CT: Praeger. ISBN 0-275-95480-3.
- Hayward, Stephen (April 2004). The Tet Offensive: Dialogues.
- Johnson, Lyndon B (1971). The Vantage Point: Perspectives on the Presidency, 1963–1969. New York: Holt, Rinehart, and Winston. ISBN 0-03-084492-4.
- Karnow, Stanley (1991). Vietnam: A History. New York: Penguin. ISBN 0-670-84218-4.
- Laurence, John (2002) The Cat from Hue: a Vietnam War Story, Public Affairs Press (New York), ISBN 1891620312
- Lewy, Gunther (1980). America in Vietnam. New York: Oxford University Press. ISBN 0-19-502732-9.
- Macdonald, Peter (1994). Giap: The Victor in Vietnam. London: Fourth Estate. ISBN 1-85702-107-X.
- Maitland, Terrence; McInerney, John (1983). A Contagion of War. Boston: Boston Publishing Company. ISBN 0-939526-05-0.
- Morocco, John (1984). Thunder from Above: Air War, 1941–1968. Boston: Boston Publishing Company. ISBN 0-939526-09-3.
- Nau, Terry L. (2013). "Chapter 4: Tet Changes The War". Reluctant Soldier... Proud Veteran: How a cynical Vietnam vet learned to take pride in his service to the USA. Leipzig: Amazon Distribution GmbH. pp. 27–38. ISBN 9781482761498. OCLC 870660174.
- Nguyen, Lien-Hang T. (2006). "The War Politburo: North Vietnam's Diplomatic and Political Road to the Tet Offensive". Journal of Vietnamese Studies. 1 (1–2): 4–58. doi:10.1525/vs.2006.1.1-2.4.
- Oberdorfer, Don (1971). Tet!: The Turning Point in the Vietnam War. Baltimore: The Johns Hopkins University Press. ISBN 0-8018-6703-7.
- Palmer, Dave Richard (1978). Summons of the Trumpet: The History of the Vietnam War from a Military Man's Viewpoint. New York: Ballantine.
- Pisor, Robert (1982). The End of the Line: The Siege of Khe Sanh. New York: Ballantine Books. ISBN 0-393-32269-6.
- Pike, COL Thomas F. (2013). Military Records, February 1968, 3rd Marine Division: The Tet Offensive. Charleston, SC: Createspace. ISBN 978-1-481219-46-4.
- Pike, COL Thomas F. (2017). I Corps Vietnam: An Aerial Retrospective. Charleston, SC: Createspace. p. 202. ISBN 978-1-36-628720-5. www.tfpike.com
- Prados, John; Stubbe, Ray (1991). Valley of Decision: The Siege of Khe Sanh. Annapolis MD: Naval Institute Press. ISBN 0-395-55003-3.
- Schandler, Herbert Y. (1977). The Unmaking of a President: Lyndon Johnson and Vietnam. Princeton NJ: Princeton University Press. ISBN 0-691-02222-4.
- Schmitz, David F. (2004). The Tet Offensive: Politics, War, and Public Opinion. Westport CT: Praeger. ISBN 0-7425-4486-9.
- Smedberg, Marco (2008). Vietnamkrigen: 1880–1980. Historiska Media. ISBN 978-91-85507-88-7.
- Sorley, Lewis (1999). A Better War: The Unexamined Victories and Final Tragedy of America's Last Years in Vietnam. New York: Harvest Books. ISBN 0-15-601309-6.
- Stanton, Shelby L. (1985). The Rise and Fall of an American Army: U.S. Ground Forces in Vietnam, 1965–1973. New York: Dell. ISBN 0-89141-232-8.
- Spector, Ronald H. (1993). After Tet: The Bloodiest Year in Vietnam. New York: The Free Press. ISBN 0-679-75046-0.
- Tran Van Tra (1994). "Tet: The 1968 General Offensive and General Uprising". In Warner, Jayne S.; Luu Doan Huynh (eds.). The Vietnam War: Vietnamese and American Perspectives. Armonk NY: M.E. Sharpe. ISBN 1-56324-131-5.
- Westmoreland, William C. (1976). A Soldier Reports. New York: Doubleday. ISBN 0-385-00434-6.
- Wiest, Andrew (2002). The Vietnam War, 1956–1975. London: Osprey Publishers. ISBN 1-84176-419-1.
- Willbanks, James H. (2008). The Tet Offensive: A Concise History. New York: Columbia University Press. ISBN 978-0-231-12841-4.
- Wirtz, James J. (1991). The Tet Offensive: Intelligence Failure in War. Ithaca NY: Cornell University Press. ISBN 0-8014-8209-7.
- Zaffiri, Samuel (1994). Westmoreland. New York: William Morrow. ISBN 0-688-11179-3.
