= General Crocker (disambiguation) =

John Crocker (1896–1963) was a British Army general. General Crocker may also refer to:

- George A. Crocker (born 1943), U.S. Army lieutenant general
- Marcellus M. Crocker (1830–1865), Union Army brigadier general
