= General Hale (disambiguation) =

General Hale is a fictional character in the TV series, Agents of Shield. General Hale may also refer to:

- Bernard Hale (British Army officer) (c. 1725–1798), British Army general
- David Hale (general) (born 1945), U.S. Army brigadier general
- Harry Clay Hale (1861–1946), U.S. Army major general
- Irving Hale (1861–1930), U.S. Army brigadier general
- John Hale (British Army officer) (1728–1806), British Army general
