= 9th Infantry Regiment (United States) =

- Coat of arms
- Active: 1855–Present
- Country: United States
- Branch: United States Army
- Type: Infantry
- Role: Stryker Infantry
- Size: 1 battalion
- Part of: 4/9INF: 1SBCT 4ID
- Garrison/HQ: 4th Battalion: Fort Carson, Colorado
- Nickname: Manchu
- Motto: Keep Up The Fire!
- Engagements: War of 1812; Mexican War; Pig War (1859); Indian Wars; Spanish–American War; Siege of Santiago; China Relief Expedition; Philippine–American War; World War I; World War II; Korean War; Battle of Heartbreak Ridge; Battle of Pork Chop Hill; Operation Paul Bunyan; Vietnam War; Operation Golden Pheasant; Operation Just Cause; War on terror; Iraq Campaign; Operation Enduring Freedom

Commanders
- Notable commanders: Franklin Pierce; George Wright; Emerson H. Liscum; Charles A. Coolidge; Huba Wass de Czege; Jones M. Withers; Olinto M. Barsanti; Edwin J. Messinger; Chester Hirschfelder; Philip Ginder; Walter M. Robertson; William Hood Simpson; Adna R. Chaffee Jr.

Insignia
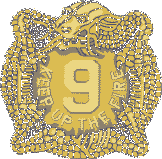
- Distinctive unit insignia

The 9th Infantry Regiment ("Manchu") is a parent infantry regiment of the United States Army.

Unrelated units designated the 9th Infantry Regiment were organized in the United States Army in 1798 during the Quasi-War, in 1812 during the war of 1812, and in 1847 during the Mexican–American War. The 1812 regiment fought in the Battle of Lundy's Lane, and the 1847 regiment in the Battle for Mexico City.

The lineage of the current regiment begins with the 1855 organization of the 9th Infantry Regiment, which was dispatched to the Pacific Northwest, where it served in the American Indian Wars. The regiment remained in the west during the American Civil War, garrisoning posts near San Francisco. After the end of the American Civil War the regiment continued its service through the final Indian Wars, then fought at the Battle of San Juan Hill during the Spanish–American War. During the Boxer Rebellion, the 9th Infantry was sent to China, where it earned the nickname Manchu. After the end of the rebellion the regiment saw duty in the Philippine–American War.

In 1917 the regiment became part of the 2nd Infantry Division, with which it served during World War I, World War II, and the Korean War. Reorganized as a parent regiment during the late 1950s as the United States Army adapted its organization to the Cold War, its 4th Battalion served with the 25th Infantry Division in the Vietnam War. The 9th's 1st, 2nd, and 3rd Battalions served in the 1989–1990 United States invasion of Panama, Operation Just Cause, with the 7th Infantry Division (Light). Its 1st and 4th Battalions fought in the Iraq War and 4th Battalion later fought in Operation Enduring Freedom in Afghanistan in 2012-2013. Detachments of 4th Battalion deployed again to Afghanistan in support of Operation Freedom’s Sentinel in 2018-2019 and to Iraq and Syria as part of Operation Inherent Resolve in 2021-2022. 4th Battalion is, as of February 2018, the only remaining active battalion of the regiment, stationed at Fort Carson with the 1st Stryker Brigade Combat Team, 4th Infantry Division.

== History ==
=== Early organizations ===
The first unit designated “9th Infantry Regiment” was one of the first permanent units authorized for the United States Army. It first appeared as a result of the Act of Congress of 16 July 1798, that authorized twelve additional regiments of infantry, in January 1799. Josiah Carville Hall, of Maryland, was its lieutenant colonel. All of the officers were appointed from Maryland, and the regiment was recruited in that state. However it was disbanded 15 June 1800. It appeared again serving in the War of 1812, it was again organized in March 1812, with Simon Learned, of Massachusetts, as colonel. The regiment was raised in Massachusetts, and took part in the war on the northern border, being present at the Battle of Lundy's Lane, and other actions in that area. Following the war in the reorganization of the army, this regiment was again disbanded. These early units called the “9th Infantry” have no lineal connection to the present regiment that was formed in 1855.

=== Mexican War ===
As a result of the Mexican–American War, in April 1847, the 9th Infantry was again organized, as one of the ten one-year regiments authorized by the Act of 11 February 1847. It was recruited primarily from the six New England states. It was briefly commanded by Colonel (and future President of the United States) Franklin Pierce before Pierce was promoted to brigadier general and commander of the brigade that included the 9th Regiment. Pierce was succeeded by Colonel Truman B. Ransom, who was killed in the assault upon Chapultepec Castle. Ransom was succeeded by Colonel Jones M. Withers, who resigned 23 May 1848, and he was succeeded by Colonel Henry L. Webb.

The regiment served in the Mexico City campaign and was in the Battle of Contreras, Battle of Churubusco, Battle of Molino del Rey and at the Battle of Chapultepec where it took a distinguished part. At the Battle of Chapultepec it was in support of the storming force, but joined with it as a part of the assault on the citadel. Sixteen officers and eleven enlisted men of the regiment were mentioned by name in the report of Major General Gideon Pillow for meritorious conduct in this battle, among the former being Second Lieutenant R. C. Drum, later a general. Another officer who served with the regiment was Major William B. Taliaferro, who became a major general in the Confederate States Army during the American Civil War.

Following the end of the war, the regiment returned to the United States where, by 26 August 1848, its officers and soldiers were discharged and the regiment was disbanded.

Similar to the earlier versions of the 9th Infantry, the Mexican-American War iteration has no lineage connection to the current 9th Infantry Regiment.

=== Oregon and Washington Territory Indian Wars ===
Between March and November 1855, the 9th Infantry Regiment was again organized under Colonel George Wright at Fortress Monroe, Virginia. It has remained in continuous existence since then; the lineage of the currently active regiment is traced back to this organization. Silas Casey was its Lieutenant-colonel, and Edward Steptoe, and Robert S. Garnett were its Majors. In December 1855 the regiment was ordered to the Pacific Coast, via Panama, arriving in the latter part of January 1856. The headquarters and Companies A, B, C, E, F, G, I and K, took station at Fort Vancouver, Washington Territory. Lieutenant-Colonel Casey with Companies D and H going to Fort Steilacoom, and was plunged into operations against the Nisqually, Muckleshoot, Puyallup, and Klickitat in the Puget Sound War.

From March 1856, Colonel Wright with companies from Fort Vancouver were fighting the Yakima War. Following the close of field operations until the spring of 1858, the regiment was engaged in building posts and making roads. In August 1857, Company F was detailed as escort to the Northern Boundary Commission and remained in the field on that duty nearly three years.

In 1858, during part of the wars with Native Americans in the West, the 9th was posted at Fort Dalles in Oregon Territory under the command of then Colonel George Wright. In May 1858, Company E under Major Steptoe formed part of a force of one hundred and fifty-nine men sent to make a reconnaissance of the country to the north of Fort Walla Walla. On 17 May 1858, Steptoe's command was attacked by over one thousand Indians in the Battle of Pine Creek which triggered the Spokane – Coeur d'Alene – Paloos War. In August 1858, an expedition from Fort Dalles under Colonel Wright proceed against the Spokane Indians and their allies. The following Battle of Four Lakes brought about a lasting peace with the Indians of eastern Washington.

In October 1860, Captain Frederick Tracy Dent with Company B and a detachment of Company E, left Fort Walla Walla, to rescue the emigrants who had escaped from the Salmon Falls Massacre, on the Snake River. In May 1861, a detachment of the regiment was detailed as an escort to the Fort Benton wagon road expedition, for nearly fifteen months.

=== Civil War and late 19th-century Indian wars ===
During the American Civil War, the 9th Infantry Regiment was ordered to San Francisco prior to its transfer to the East. Its colonel, George Wright, was promoted to command of the Department of the Pacific, and the order was revoked. The regiment was left on the Pacific Coast, where it had duty at the posts near San Francisco, performing provost guard duty in that city until late in 1865. Following the death of Colonel Wright in the wreck of the steamer Brother Jonathan, Colonel John H. King succeeded to command of the 9th Regiment in December 1866.

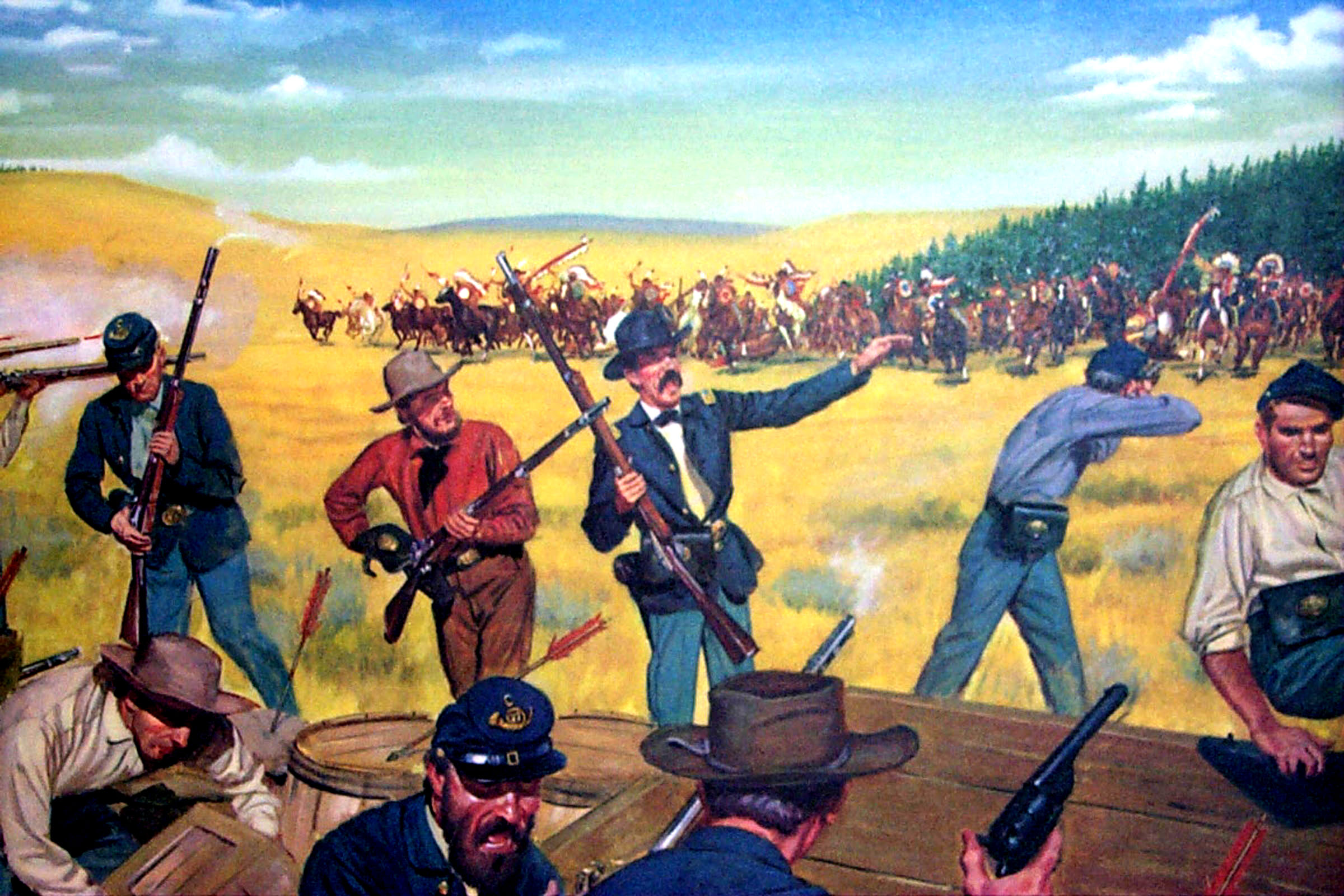
Near Fort Phil Kearney, Wyoming, 2 August 1867. The Wagon Box Fight. A small force of 30 men on the 9th Infantry led by Brevet Major James Powell was attacked in the early morning hours by some 2,000 Sioux Indians. The soldiers hastily erected a barricade of wagon boxes, and withstood multiple charge. The Sioux finally withdrew, leaving behind several hundred killed and wounded.

During the period from 1866 to 1869, elements of the regiment were in the Snake War in Northern California and Oregon and in conflict with the Chemehuevi in Southern California. In June 1869, the regiment was ordered to the Department of the Platte, where it absorbed the 2nd establishment of the 27th Infantry Regiment. It was from the 27th Infantry Regiment that the regiment gets its Civil War battle honors, derived from the 2nd Battalion of the 18th Infantry Regiment that was the cadre around which the 27th formed at the end of the Civil War.

Following the reorganization the 9th Infantry performed garrison duty at various posts and guard duty on the Union Pacific Railroad line. In May 1873, six companies, A, D, E, F, H and I, were sent to the Department of Dakota for duty with the Yellowstone Expedition, escorting the engineers locating the Northern Pacific Railroad. From the summer of 1874 to May 1876, the regiment was stationed at posts on or near the Sioux reservation in Nebraska and Wyoming and was almost constantly escorting wagon trains. In the summer of 1875 Companies C, E and H, were in the Black Hills, Dakota, as part of the escort to the Newton–Jenney Party, Company E remained in the field until November assisting in ejecting white intruders who had entered Sioux territory.

In May 1876, Companies C, G and H became a part of the Big Horn and Yellowstone Expedition under command of Brigadier General Crook and were in the field until late in October taking part in the engagement with the Indians at Tongue River, Montana, 9 June, the Battle of the Rosebud, and the Battle of Slim Buttes. Companies G and H also assisted in repelling a night attack by Indians on the camp on Goose Creek, Wyoming, 9 July 1876. In the early part of September the entire command was without rations for a number of days, and subsisted on horse flesh and a small quantity of dried meat and fruit captured at Slim Buttes. In October 1876, the Powder River Expedition was organized and Companies A, B, D, F, I and K formed a part of it. They remained in the field until January 1877, during the most severe part of the winter, and practically brought to a termination the Great Sioux War of 1876.

In July 1877, Companies B, D, F, H, I and K were a part of the force sent to Chicago, Illinois, at the time of the Great Railroad Strike of 1877. They remained a month performing guard duty over various public and private institutions.

During the summer and fall of 1878 Companies B, C, H and I were a part of a force of observation on the Little Missouri River, and in the northwestern part of the Black Hills.

In October 1878 Companies G and K were part of the force in the field in the Cheyenne War. Company K was mounted and took active part in the pursuit.

In October 1879, Companies E and K went into the field in the White River War, remaining until July 1880.

In 1883, Col. John S. Mason, took command of the 9th Regiment and in July 1886, the regiment went to the Department of Arizona. During their service there the regiment was in garrisons at every post in Arizona and at some posts in New Mexico. Four companies, C, E, H and I, were in the field in New Mexico for about a month during the Apache campaign of 1886 against Geronimo.

Following the end of the Indian Wars the regiment participated in the Spanish–American War. It fought in the Battle of San Juan Hill A member of the ninth infantry, Ira C. Welborn, was awarded the Medal of Honor for going under enemy fire to save a private.

The US 9th Infantry Regiment in the Philippines, 1899

=== 20th century ===
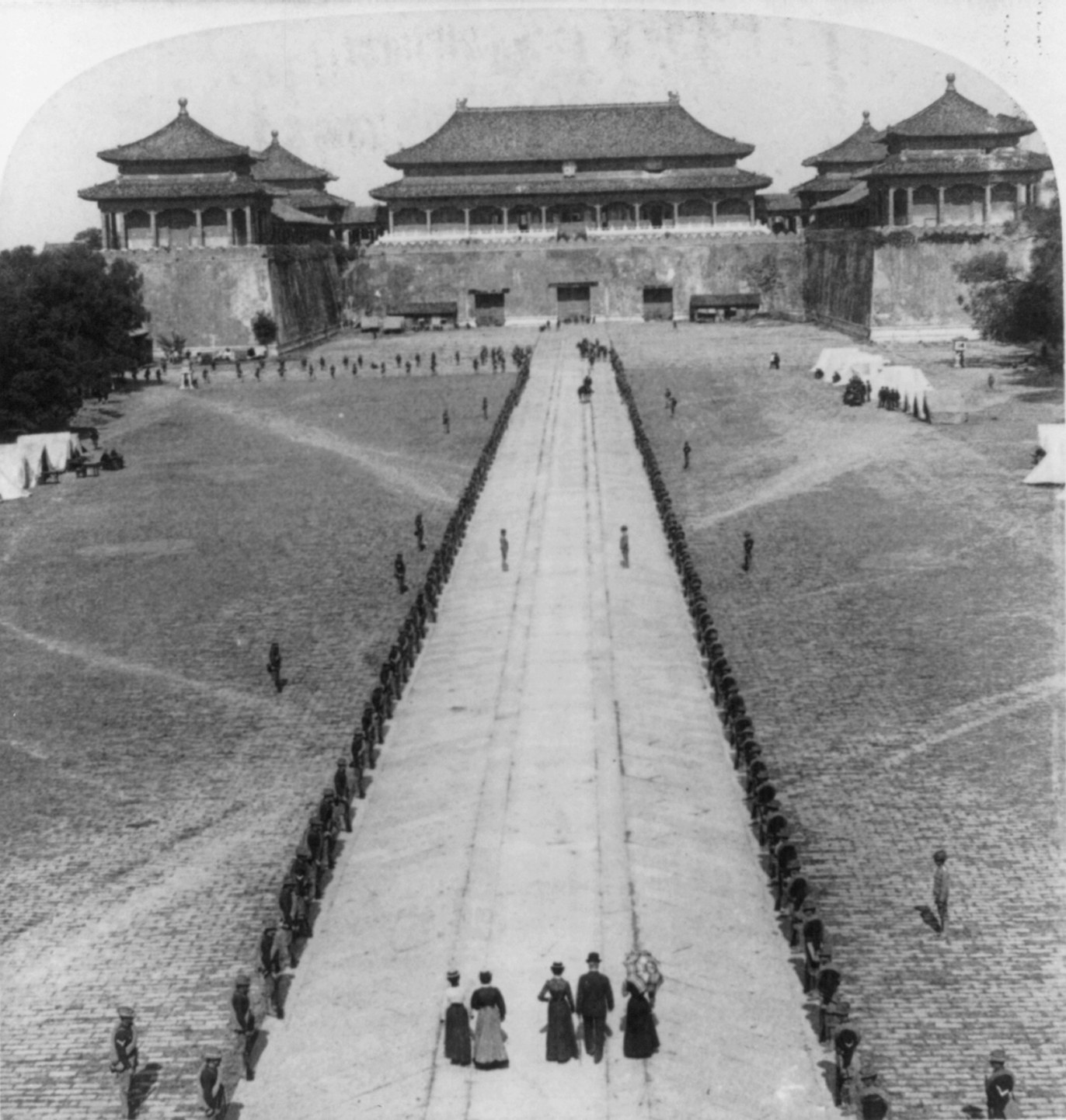
9th Infantry Regiment lined up before the Meridian Gate, Forbidden City, Peking, c. 1901. American Minister Edwin H. Conger and family in foreground.

==== Boxer Rebellion ====
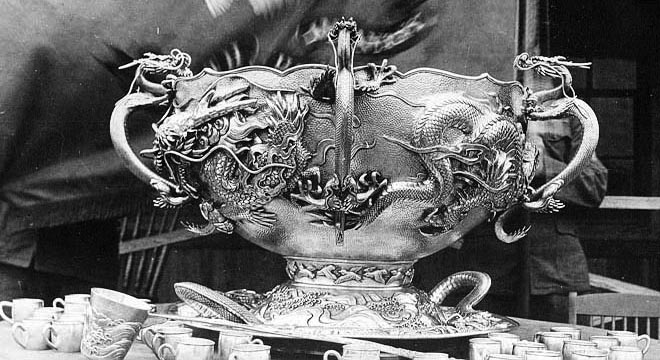
The Regiment's prized Liscum Bowl, was made from silver given to the 9th Infantry Regiment by China after the Battle of Tientsin. It is now worth more than $2.5 million.

At the beginning of the century the U.S. Army dispatched the 9th Infantry Regiment to Qing China during the Boxer Rebellion and the China Relief Expedition where the regiment earned the nickname "Manchus".

During the Battle of Tientsin, three 9th Regiment soldiers received the Medal of Honor and the regimental commander, Col. Emerson H. Liscum, was killed by Chinese fire, as was the flag bearer for the regiment. A Chinese sniper shot Liscum as he tried to steady the flag after the bearer was killed. The Chinese again unleashed a torrent of fire upon the Allies, which forced them to lie face down in mud. The dark blue uniform of the American troops provided a virtual bull's eye to the Chinese troops, equipped with western firearms, such as Winchesters, Mausers, and Mannlichers. Many American troops died from Chinese sniper fire before they took the city. The regiment suffered a ten percent casualty rate in the battle.

Colonel Liscum's dying words gave the regiment its motto, "Keep up the Fire." Lt. Col. Charles A. Coolidge assumed command, the Allies then captured the city. Additionally, the 9th Regiment saved millions of dollars' worth of silver from being looted from a government mint. In a show of gratitude from the Chinese government, the regiment was awarded two silver ingots from which the Liscum Bowl was created. The regiment fought in the Battle of Yangcun.

==== Philippines ====
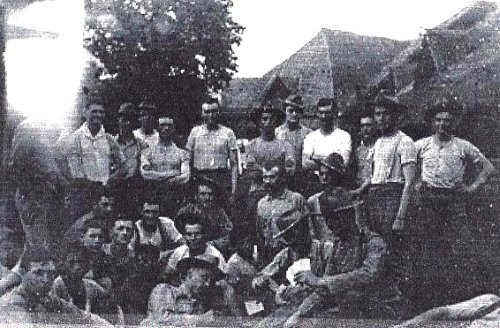
Soldiers of Company C, 9th US Infantry Regiment with Valeriano Abanador (standing, sixth from right) in Balangiga in August 1901.

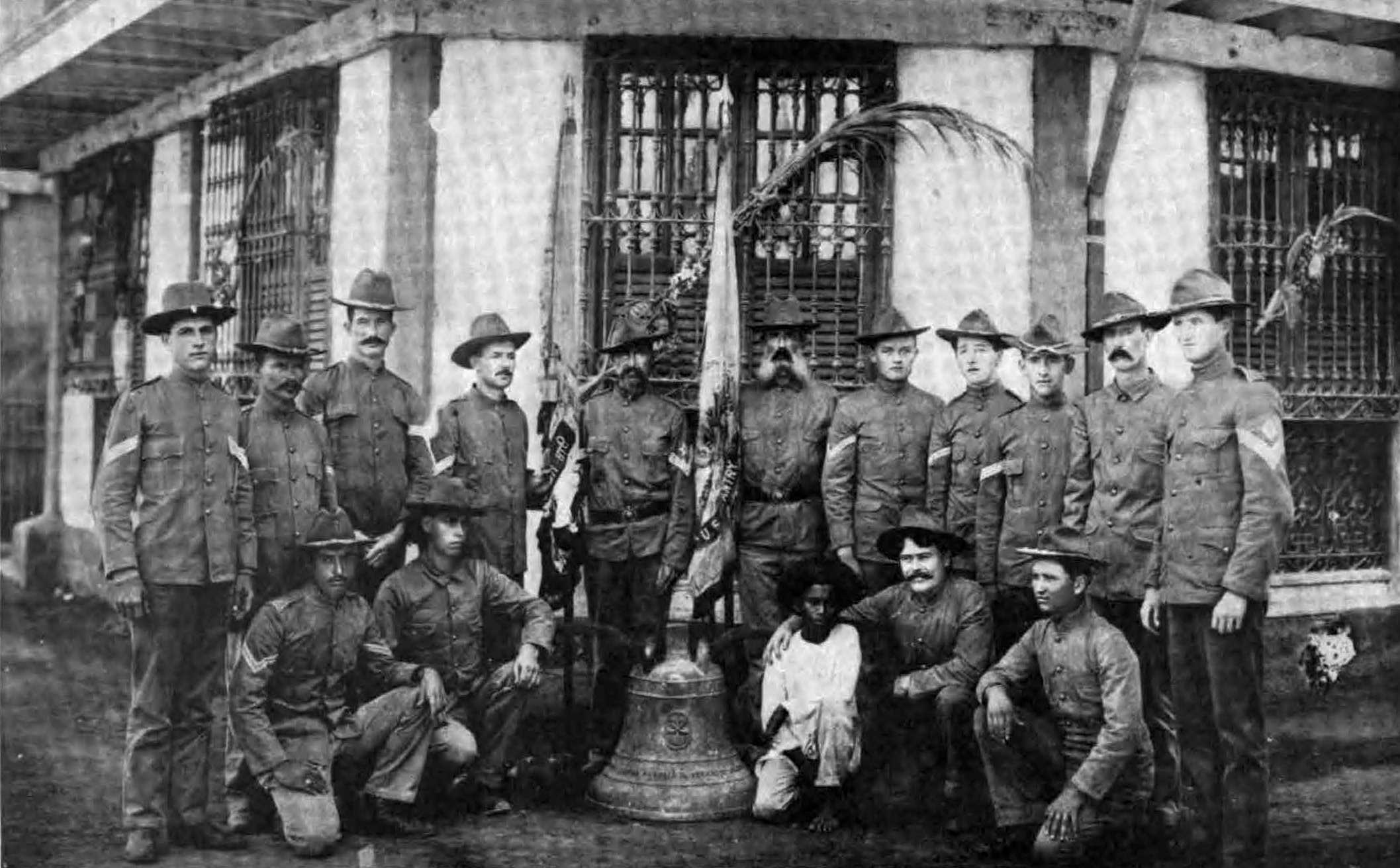
U.S. soldiers of Company C, 9th Infantry Regiment pose with one of the Balangiga bells seized as war trophy. Photo taken in Calbayog, Samar in April 1902.

Following duty in China the regiment served in the Philippine–American War; Company C of the Regiment suffered casualties in the Balangiga massacre of September 1901.

==== World War I ====
In early October 1917, the Manchus deployed to France as part of the "Indianhead" 2nd Infantry Division. During the course of the war, 9th infantrymen earned battle streamers for their colors at Lorraine, Île-de-France, Aisne-Marne, and St. Mihiel. In 1918, the Manchu Regiment received the French Fourragère for gallantry during the Meuse-Argonne offensive.

==== Interwar period ====
The 9th Infantry Regiment arrived at the port of New York on 1 August 1919 on the USS Princess Matoika, and was transferred on 16 August 1919 to Camp Travis, Texas; Camp Travis was consolidated 12 December 1922 with Fort Sam Houston. The regiment typically maintained one company at Camp Bullis, Texas, and one company at Fort Crockett, Texas, from 1921 to 1940. The regiment participated 20 September–2 November 1926 in the production of the Metro-Goldwyn-Mayer movie Wings at Camp Stanley, Texas. Company M was awarded the Edwin Howard Clark machine gun trophy for 1934. For the company stationed at Fort Crockett, its initial wartime mission in accordance with established war plans was to conduct a mobile defense of possible amphibious landing areas in support of the Harbor Defenses of Galveston Bay.

==== World War II ====
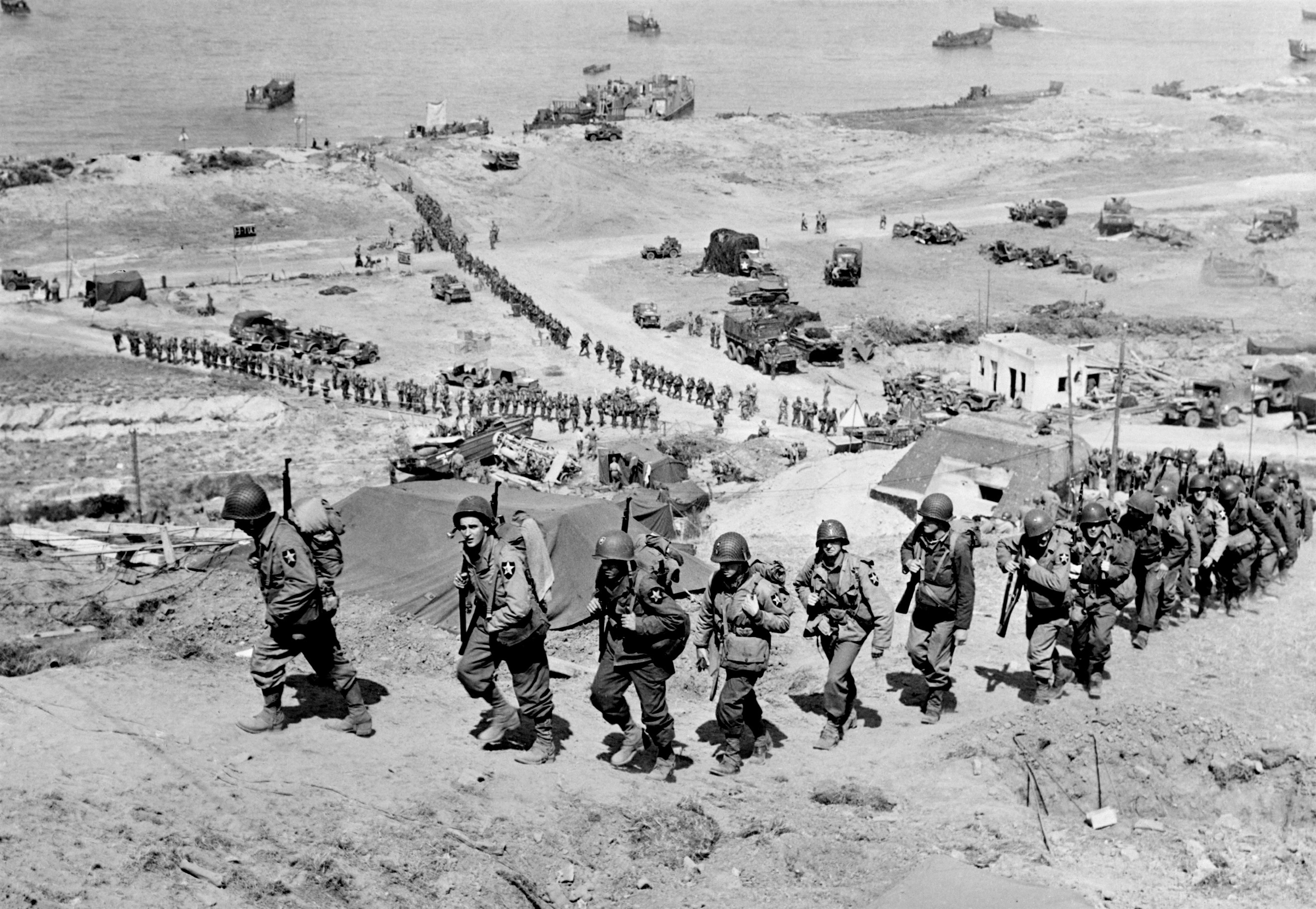
2nd Infantry Division marching up the bluff at the E-1 draw in the Easy Red sector of Omaha Beach on D+1, 7 June 1944.

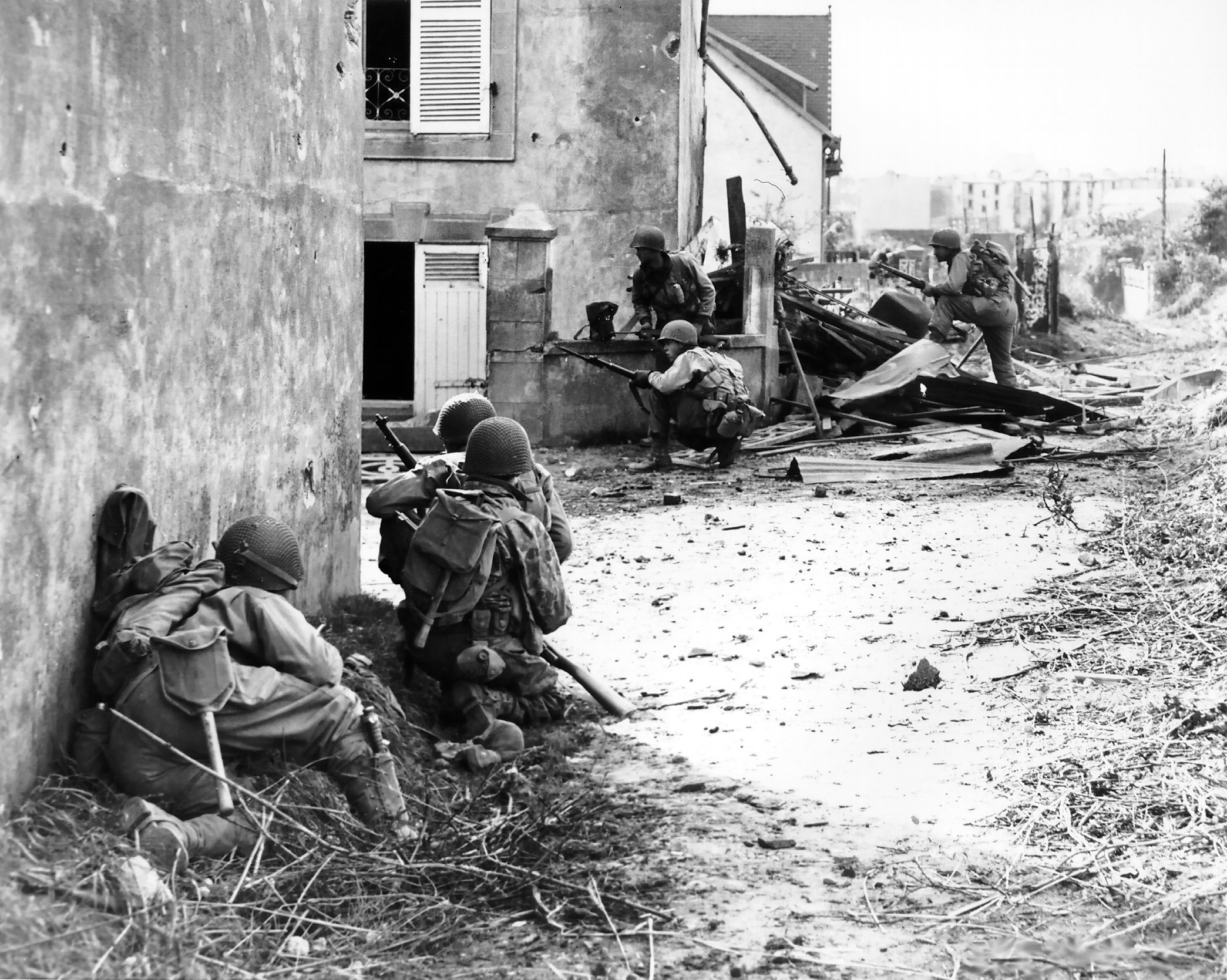
Troops of the 2nd Infantry Division advance under machine gun fire into the outskirts of Brest August/September 1944.

The 9th Infantry Regiment returned to Europe with the Second Infantry Division in October 1943 for the invasion of France. Some men from the 9th would volunteer their services to the Special Engineer Task Force for their Assault on Omaha Beach on D-Day, along with men from the 23rd Infantry Regiment and 2nd Combat Engineer Battalion. A few of these men were killed on the 6th of June 1944 while being embedded with the 146th & 299th Combat Engineer Battalion’s Assault Gap teams. The rest of the 9th and the whole of the 2nd Division would come ashore on D-Day +1 to the 10th of June. The Regiment would help break out from the Normandy beachhead and participated in the fight for Hill 192, a pivotal strongpoint in The Battle of Saint-Lo and participated in the Battle for Brest. In December 1944 the 9th Infantry was at Elsenborn Ridge where it waged an 18-hour engagement during the Battle of the Bulge. After the reduction of the German salient, the 9th spearheaded a 1945 drive toward the Siegfried Line. The Manchus crossed the Rhine in March 1945 and advanced rapidly through Saxony into Czechoslovakia, ending the war with many decorations including three Presidential Unit Citations.

==== Korean War ====
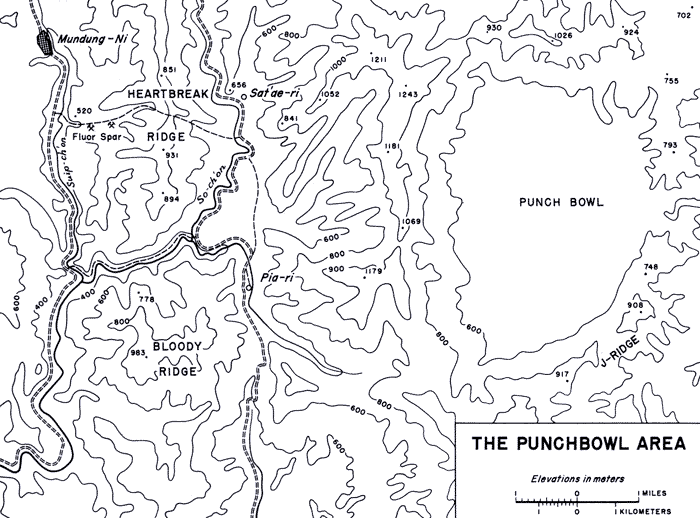
Map of the Punchbowl, Heartbreak Ridge and Bloody Ridge

When South Korea was invaded in 1950 the Manchus returned to the far east and the Korean Peninsula. Manchu troops were the first of the 2nd Infantry Division to engage North Korean forces, at Yongsan in August 1950, against numerically superior force. They were later successful at Bloody Ridge, Heartbreak Ridge, Old Baldy, Pork Chop Hill, and T-Bone Hill. During the Korean War, the regiment earned an additional Presidential Unit Citation for its gallant service at Hongchon, and six of its members received the Medal of Honor: Loren R. Kaufman (4 and 5 September 1950), Edward C. Krzyzowski (31 August to 3 September 1951), Joseph R. Ouellette (31 August to 3 September 1951), David M. Smith (1 September 1950), Luther H. Story (1 September 1950) and Travis E. Watkins (31 August to 3 September 1950).

==== Interwar Period ====
On 20 June 1957, the regiment was relieved from the 2nd Infantry Division and reorganized as a parent regiment under the Combat Arms Regimental System. Until then, the Army preserved battle honors and history of the regiments during the reduction after every war by consolidating those into the remaining regiments. With the reorganization of the divisions into Pentomic divisions with five battle groups instead of regiments, the Army developed a new system in which units could be inactivated and reactivated and still maintain the history and battle honors of named regiment and battalions. The 10th Infantry Division was reflagged as the 2nd Infantry Division and reorganized into a Pentomic Division at Fort Benning, Georgia in June 1958. The 1st and 4th Battalions of the 9th Infantry remained in Alaska as a separate battle group while the 2nd Battalion was reactivated as the 2nd Battle Group, 9th Infantry under the 2nd Infantry Division. The short-lived Pentomic experiment turned out to be an utter failure and the Army reorganized into Reorganization Objective Army Division in 1963, but instead of three regiments with three battalions each, the new division had three brigades with three battalions each. To preserve as many regimental histories as possible, the brigades typically had no more than two battalions of any regiment. The 2nd and 4th Battle Groups were reorganized and redesignated the 2nd and 4th Battalions, 9th Infantry in February 1963. The 1st and 2nd Battalions fell under the 2nd Infantry Division while the 4th Battalion at Fort Wainwright fell under the 171st Infantry Brigade until it was transferred to the 25th Infantry Division in 1966.

In 1963, the new 2nd Infantry Division reorganized and trained in the air assault concept identified by the Howze Board with the 1st Battalion, 9th Infantry reassigned to it. The division was then redesignated as the 11th Air Assault Division. In 1965, the division was redesignated as the 1st Cavalry Division and essentially the flags traded places with similar units in Korea. The 1st and 2nd Battalions, 9th Infantry were reflagged in Korea under the 2nd infantry Division. The 2nd Battalion remained in Korea until inactivated at Fort Lewis in June 1971.

==== Vietnam War ====
On 14 January 1966, the 4th Battalion, 9th Infantry Regiment, was relieved from assignment to the 171st Infantry Brigade and assigned to the 25th Infantry Division "Tropic Lightning" at Schofield Barracks, Hawaii. A month earlier these Manchus had been in Alaska preparing for annual winter maneuvers to be conducted in temperatures of 50 below zero. Eight weeks later the battalion was preparing for deployment to the heat and humidity of South Vietnam.

On 29 April, the battalion disembarked the ship General Walker at Vũng Tàu, Vietnam. Within hours of their arrival they found themselves under fire as their convoy made its way to the 25th Division's Củ Chi Base Camp. The next day, a little more than 24 hours after arriving in country, Alpha company engaged the enemy in a firefight – setting the tone of regular contact that would characterize the Manchu experience for the next four and a half years.

Many operations were conducted by company-sized or smaller units but there were also notable larger scale operations in which the entire battalion took part. They included Asheville, Wahiawa, Joliet I and II, Helemano, and Kahana I and II.

On 22 February 1968 the Manchus closed the Katum Camp which had served as the large forward base for the 1st BDE near the Cambodian border. After a day at Tây Ninh Combat Base to prepare, the Manchus moved out to Củ Chi and eventually arrived north of Tan Son Nhut on 25 February. The mission was to find and destroy rocket sites that had been used to fire on Tan Son Nhut Air Base since the Tet Offensive began nearly a month earlier. At 9:00 AM on 2 March 1968, the Manchus walked into what was to become one of the worst single-encounter loss of life incidents in the history of the Vietnam war. Forty-nine members of Charlie Company were killed and 24 wounded in an ambush by a large communist force on Route 248 north and east of Tan Son Nhut near the small village of Quoi Xuan. In addition, C Company suffered 24 wounded while D Company suffered casualties in the fighting to reach Charlie Company. SP4 Nicholas J. Cutinha would be posthumously awarded the Medal of Honor for his actions at Quoi Xuan. Manchu Alpha, Bravo, and Delta continued operations in this area and took many more casualties until finally leaving on 11 March 1968. Rocket sites had been destroyed, and a formidable communist force had been weakened, if not destroyed. But, it had come at a great cost to the Manchus and particularly Charlie Company.

In the four years and six months of service in Vietnam with the 25th Division, the 4th Battalion of the Manchus received two Presidential Citations and added 12 campaign streamers to regimental colors for combat operations in the Republic of Vietnam (South Vietnam). It is estimated that 450 4th Battalion Manchus were killed in the Vietnam War.

Three Manchus were posthumous recipients of the Medal of Honor, the United States' highest award for valor: Nicholas J. Cutinha, Ruppert L. Sargent and Maximo Yabes.

==== 1970s ====
After its service during the Vietnam War, the 4th Battalion was transferred back to Hawaii where it was inactivated in June 1972 and reactivated under the 171st Infantry Brigade again in Alaska in August 1972. During the Vietnam War, the 6th Battalion, 9th Infantry Regiment was assigned to the 171st Infantry Brigade at Fort Wainwright, Alaska. The majority of the unit's training was in light infantry winter operations. The training consisted of developing cold weather operations and mountaineering skills. Modes of transportation included using skis or snowshoes and pulling equipment on Ahkio sleds; helicopters; or Air Force transport aircraft. Company C, 6th Battalion was an Airborne unit, and was the first of the "Charlie Airborne" companies stationed in Alaska. Summer training was primarily adventurous in nature, and included encampments at primitive locations within the state. The 6th Battalion was also a regular participant in the annual 'Alaska Days' parade in Sitka. The 9th Infantry Regiment was included in this event because it was stationed in Sitka when the Alaska Purchase was finalized, and Alaska was turned over to the United States by Imperial Russia. In 1972, the 6th Battalion was inactivated, and its Soldiers and equipment were used to reactivate the 4th Battalion, 9th Infantry Regiment. The 4th Battalion was assigned to the 172nd Infantry Brigade at Fort Richardson, but remained stationed at Fort Wainwright, and its Company C was retained on airborne status.

In the summer of 1975, the inactive 2nd Battalion was activated and assigned to the 1st Brigade, 2nd Infantry Division, at Camp Casey, Republic of Korea (South Korea). In March 1976, the 2nd Battalion moved to Camp Greaves near the DMZ, with A Company manning Camp Liberty Bell. Missions there included reconnaissance patrols within the DMZ; manning Guard Posts Collier and Oulette, both located within the DMZ and supporting the United Nations Command Joint Security Force at Camp Kitty Hawk; securing Freedom Bridge, spanning the route south from Panmunjom across the Imjim river; and manning a small sector of the southern boundary fence of the DMZ. (Camp Kitty Hawk was later renamed Camp Bonifas in memory of Captain Arthur Bonifas, who was murdered along with Lieutenant Mark Barrett by North Korean troops during the Axe Murder Incident, which resulted in Operation Paul Bunyan being conducted by the United States Army.)

In late 1978, the 2nd Battalion was relieved of duty on the DMZ by its sister 1st Battalion, 9th Infantry Regiment and then inactivated at Fort Riley, Kansas in December 1979. The 1st Battalion had been stationed at Camp Hovey and Camp Liberty bell was commanded by LTC Clinton Fields. The 1st Battalion continued the mission to man Guard Posts Oulette and Collier, conduct combat and recon patrols, man the southern entrance to the DMZ and maintain the bridge platoon that guarded Freedom Bridge. LTC Clinton Fields relinquished command of the 1st Battalion to LTC Michael D. Collins soon after the move from Camp Hovey to Camp Greaves.

==== 1980s and 1990s ====
In 1983, the 1st Battalion was a light infantry battalion still stationed in Korea under the 3rd Brigade of the 2nd Infantry Division while the 4th Battalion remained in Alaska. As part of the Combat Arms Regimental System, the 7th Infantry Division at Fort Ord, California reflagged two battalions in its 1st Brigade as the 2nd and 4th Battalions of the 9th Infantry in 1983. In concept, the 9th Infantry would have two battalions stateside and one forward deployed overseas. In 1985, the 7th Infantry Division reorganized as a light infantry division. This began the light infantry phase of Manchu history. That same year, the 1st Brigade Commander, Colonel Robert L. Ord III, redesignated the 2-17th Infantry as the 3rd Battalion of the 9th Infantry and then redesignated his brigade headquarters as the 9th Infantry Regiment. This became the only brigade redesignated as a regiment in the 7th Infantry Division.

In 1986, Colonel Huba Wass de Czege assumed command of the regiment. The 3rd Battalion had become the first COHORT battalion of the regiment and upon arrival at Fort Ord, every new COHORT battalion had to complete a Rights of Passage (ROP) training to qualify it to deploy, since the division belonged to the Rapid Deployment Force. The Light Fighter training culminated with a 25-mile road march. Every member of the regiment by virtue of assignment was authorized to wear the Manchu belt buckle. Wass de Czege made it policy that Manchus earned the right to wear the belt buckle upon completion of the 25-mile road march. This ordeal would continue long after the light infantry days and become known as the "Manchu Mile."

In April 1987, the Army redesignated the 1st Battalion as the 1st Battalion of the 506th Parachute Infantry and Wass de Czege redesignated the 4th Battalion as the 1st. This brought the trophy room and Liscum Bowl to Fort Ord. In 1988, Colonel David R.E. Hale replaced Wass de Czege as the regimental commander.

In April 1989, the 3rd Battalion deployed to the Sinai as part of the Multinational Force and Observers (MFO). In May, the 1st and 2nd Battalions along with the regimental headquarters deployed to Panama as part of a show-of-force Operation Nimrod Dancer along with other U.S. forces. At that time, the entire 9th Infantry had the unique distinction of being deployed on peacekeeping missions around the globe. Stationed at Fort Sherman, companies of the 9th conducted route reconnaissance and security patrols between Forts Sherman and Gulick on the other side of the Panama Canal. The Bravo Company “Bandits” of 2nd Battalion, commanded by CPT Warren Bishop, and an Engineer squad occupied an abandoned Officer's Club and the abandoned movie theater on Fort Espinar (previously known as Fort Gulick; prior home of the School of the Americas) and conducted live presence patrolling to protect American families living on Fort Espinar who at the time were being harassed by Panamanian forces. The Bandits also conducted live patrolling at the nearby Rodman Arraijan Tank Farm. By the end of November, the 9th Infantry all elements of the regiment had re-deployed to Fort Ord and returned less than a month later for the U.S. invasion.

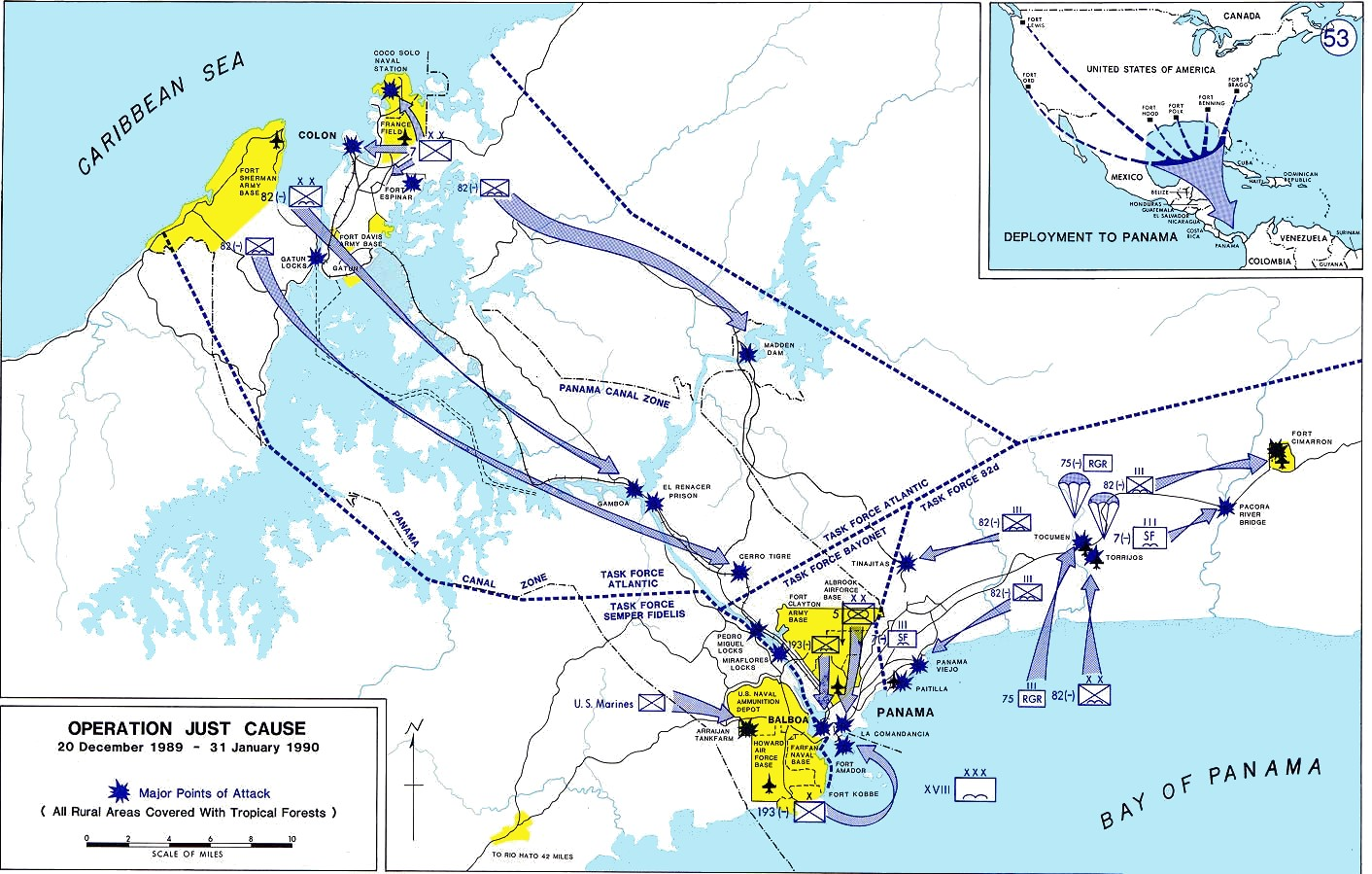
Tactical map of Operation Just Cause showing major points of attack

During Operation Just Cause in December 1989, the 9th Infantry deployed to Panama under the command of Colonel Hale as last brigade of the 7th Infantry Division (Light). The 3rd Brigade had replaced it at Fort Sherman the previous month and the 2nd Brigade received responsibility to force the surrender of Panamanian Defense Forces (PDF) from the Canal Zone to the Costa Rican border. With two division headquarters in Panama, the 82nd Airborne Division assumed operational control of the Atlantic side of the Canal Zone with the 3rd Brigade and the 7th Infantry Division received responsibility for clearing Panama City of resistance. It received operational control of its 9th Infantry and the brigade from the 82nd. Lt. Col. Chuck Swannack commanded the 2nd Battalion in the city. The main focus shifted to searching for weapons cashes hidden in the city. Based upon vetted reports, 2nd Battalion's Alpha Company under the command of Captain Terry Whitacker raided a residence and found an extensive weapons cache but unknown to them at the time belonged to the Nicaraguan ambassador. This caused an international incident.

The Manchus of the 1st, 2nd and 3rd Battalions earned the Combat Infantryman Badge (CIB) for the first time since the Korean War. Initially DOD awarded the CIB to all soldiers who took part in Just Cause, but subsequently rescinded the awards after closer review of regulations found that the CIB could only be awarded to 11-series MOS (infantry) soldiers. This led to an attempt by a number of 1st Battalion infantrymen to return their CIBs in solidarity with the combat medics, air defenders, and others who had to take up the rifle and engage in the same house to house and jungle fighting as the infantry. After clearing its area of responsibility, the 9th Infantry conducted a relief in place of the brigade from the 82nd and continued to clear that sector of Panama City. it finally redeployed to Fort Ord in February 1990.

Panama was the last conflict fought by the Manchus under the 7th Infantry Division (Light). Colonel Ord rose to lieutenant general and commanded United States Army Pacific. Colonel Wass de Czege retired as a brigadier general. Lt. Col Swannack commanded the 82nd Airborne Division during Operation Iraqi Freedom. Another key officer was Lt. Col. William J. "Bill" Leszczynski, Jr., who later commanded the 75th Ranger Regiment and was promoted to brigadier general. Hale himself became a major general, but was forced into retirement because of personal misconduct of a sexual nature. Hale was subsequently court-martialed in 1999 and reduced in rank (for retired pay purposes) to brigadier general.

As part of 1993 Base Realignment and Closure, the Army inactivated the 9th infantry Division at Fort Lewis, Washington and planned to replace it with the 7th Infantry Division (Light) due to the scheduled closure of Fort Ord. The 1st, 2nd, and 3rd Battalions and the Regimental Headquarters (along with the Regimental Treasure, including the Liscum Bowl) became the first brigade of the division to relocate to Fort Lewis in late 1993. The unit moved into the barracks near the 75th Ranger Battalion, adjacent to Grey Army Airfield on the main post of Fort Lewis. One of the last cohort units of basic training recruits (B Co, 38th ID, Fort Benning) which were initially assigned to the 7th Infantry Division were subsequently either reassigned to other mechanized units or reassigned to the 9th in Fort Lewis just prior to graduation and were quickly integrated into the 9th once they reported for duty there. The Army inactivated the 7th Infantry Division and its two remaining brigades at Fort Ord in 1994. So, the 1st, 2nd and 3rd Battalions of the 9th continued to serve at Fort Lewis for the next two years, before being reassigned to the 25th Infantry Division.

The 4th and 5th Battalions, 9th Infantry Regiment were activated back at Fort Wainwright, Alaska in 1986. They were assigned to the 1st Brigade of the 6th Infantry Division (Arctic Light) and were specially trained in Arctic warfare. The 5th Battalion was reflagged 1st Battalion, 17th Infantry Regiment in 1994 and the 4th Battalion was reflagged 2nd Battalion, 1st Infantry Regiment in 1995. These renamings occurred prior to the brigade being redesignated as the 172nd Infantry Brigade and the division being inactivated.

In January 1995, the 1st, 2nd, and 3rd Battalion, 9th Infantry Regiment, along with augmentation from the 79th Forward Support Battalion, 2nd Battalion, 8th Field Artillery (Automatic), and the 13th Engineer Company, deployed from Fort Lewis to Guantanamo Bay, Cuba in support of Operation Sea Signal where they provided transportation and security for Cuban and Haitian immigrants awaiting movement to the United States by supporting camps Echo, Foxtrot, and Golf. The 1st of the 9th, known as Task Force 1st Manchu, returned to Fort Lewis in June 1995. In August 1995, the 1st Brigade (sometimes erroneously referred to as the 9th Regimental Combat Team, although RCTs had not existed in Army force structure since the late 1950s), which included the battalions of the 9th Infantry at Fort Lewis were reflagged as the 1st Brigade, 25th Infantry Division and the Manchu name and colors returned to the 2nd Infantry Division stationed in Korea. The reflagging ceremony took place on I Corps' parade grounds and included a "Drink the Fire" ceremony, during which all assigned Manchu soldiers drank a toast from the Liscum Bowl.

The 1st and 2nd Battalions of the 9th Infantry Regiment returned to Korea in September 1995 while the 3rd Battalion was inactivated. (i.e. units already deployed in Korea were redesignated as the 1st and 2nd Battalions).

=== 21st century ===
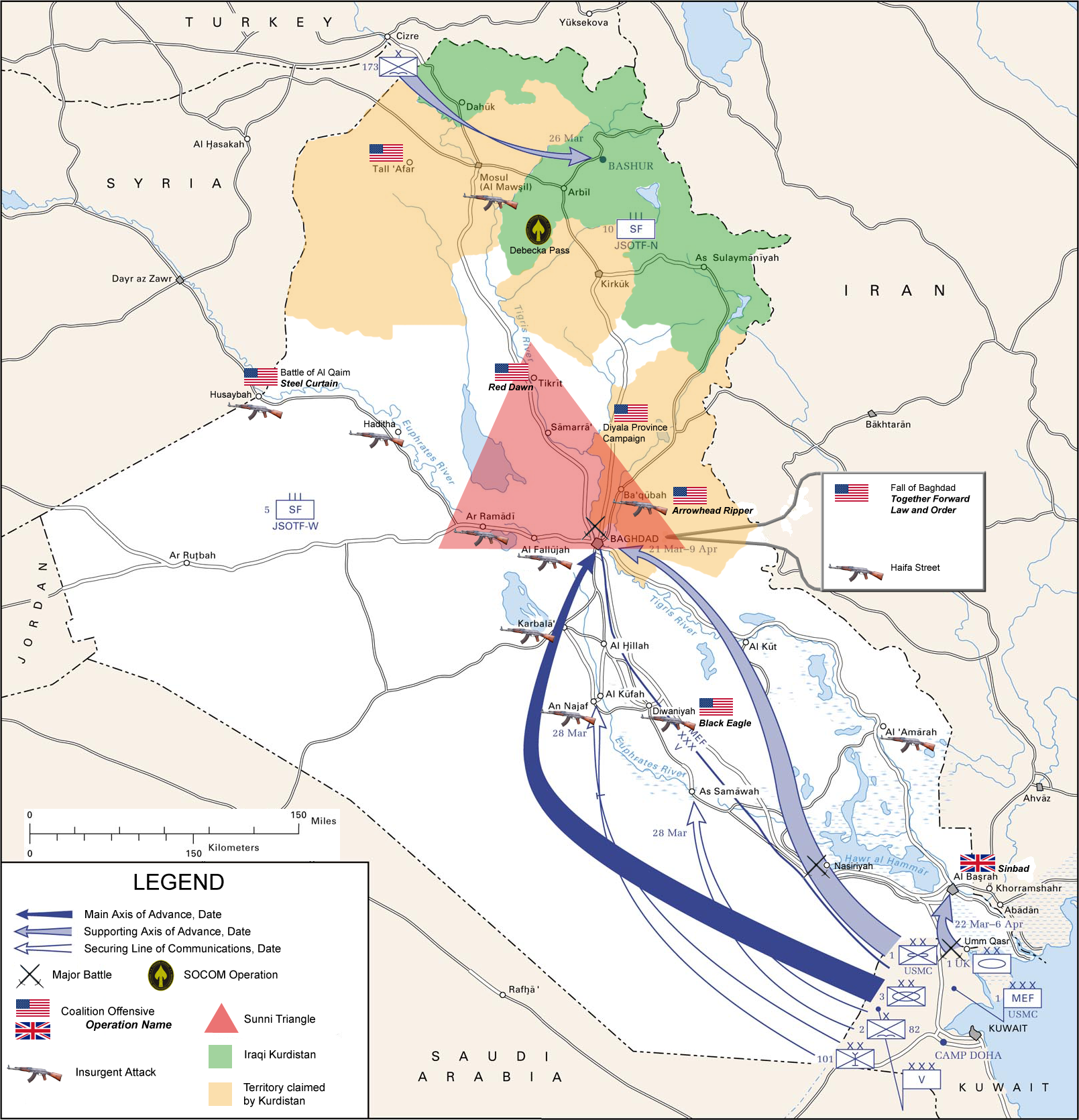
Map of the invasion routes and major operations/battles of the Iraq War through 2007

1st Battalion of the 9th Infantry Regiment (Manchu) recently returned from a tour in Iraq, serving in Operation Iraqi Freedom I and II from August 2004 to July 2005 where C.Co 1–9 Infantry (Manchu) 1st and 2nd platoon participated in the initial attacks of the Second Battle of Fallujah (Operation Phantom Fury). Upon returning stateside the Manchu's were based at Fort Carson, Colorado, as part of the 2nd Brigade Combat Team of the Second Infantry Division. In November 2005, the First Battalion of the 9th Infantry Regiment had the majority of their personnel transferred to the newly activated 3rd Squadron of the 61st Cavalry Regiment as part of the 2nd Brigade Combat Team, 2nd Infantry Division. At the same time, the Unit Colors of the 1st Battalion, 503rd Infantry (also a part of the 2nd Brigade Combat Team at the time) was transferred to Vicenza, Italy to be stationed with the 173rd Infantry Brigade (Airborne), the personnel remaining at Fort Carson, Colorado were transferred to the 1st Battalion, 9th Infantry. The battalion deployed with 2nd Brigade Combat Team in support of Operation Iraqi Freedom 06–08 to Ramadi, successfully defeated the insurgency during Operation Murfreesboro. Upon redeployment to Fort Carson, the brigade reflagged to 4th Brigade Combat Team of the 4th Infantry Division, and the battalion reflagged to 1st Battalion, 12th Infantry Regiment.

The Second Battalion of the 9th Infantry Regiment is not active today, due to draw downs the 1st Brigade of the 2nd Infantry Division, which was based in Camp Casey in South Korea has been deactivated June 2015. The Second and Battalion had a twice a year tradition called the "Manchu Mile", which involves its members marching 25 miles (40.2 km) in full combat gear across Korea's mountainous terrain. This is to commemorate an 85-mile forced march performed by the unit during the Boxer Rebellion.

The Third Battalion of the 9th Infantry Regiment is not active at this time.

The Fourth Battalion of the 9th Infantry Regiment was re-activated on 1 June 2006 and was assigned to the newly designated 4th Brigade Combat Team, 2nd Infantry Division, based at Joint Base Lewis-McChord, Washington. As the 4th Brigade is a Stryker Brigade Combat Team, this battalion of the 9th Infantry Regiment is now a fully mobile mechanized infantry unit. The battalion deployed to Iraq in the spring of 2007 and engaged in combat operations in Tarmiyah, the Battle of Baqubah, and other locations throughout Diyala and Salah Ed-Din. At the same time they field tested the Army's Land Warrior next generation soldier technology.

The Fourth Battalion returned from Iraq in the fall of 2010 during the last days of Operation Iraqi Freedom. The Fourth Battalion also deployed in support of Operation Enduring Freedom from fall 2012 to summer 2013. It was then deactivated along with the rest of the 4th Brigade Combat Team and moved to Fort Carson, Colorado, where it was reactivated as the 1st Stryker Brigade Combat Team, 4th Infantry Division and is the only remaining Manchu battalion still active today. A detachment of 4th Battalion deployed again to Afghanistan, where they were responsible for the Ground Defense Area around Bagram Airfield in support of Operation Freedom’s Sentinel from 2018-2019, and would also deploy to Iraq and Syria in support of Operation Inherent Resolve for nine months in 2021-2022.

== Lineage ==
- Constituted 3 March 1855 in the Regular Army as the 9th Infantry Regiment
- Organized 26 March 1855 at Fort Monroe, Virginia
- Constituted 3 May 1861 in the Regular Army as the 2d Battalion, 18th Infantry Regiment
- Organized in October 1861 at Camp Thomas, Ohio
- Reorganized and redesignated 21 September 1866 as the 27th Infantry Regiment
- Consolidated in June 1869 with the 27th Infantry and consolidated unit designated as the 9th Infantry
- Assigned 22 September 1917 to the 2d Division (later redesignated as the 2nd Infantry Division)
- Relieved 20 June 1957 from assignment to the 2nd Infantry Division and reorganized as a parent regiment under the Combat Arms Regimental System
- Withdrawn 29 April 1983 from the Combat Arms Regimental System and reorganized under the U.S. Army Regimental System

== Honors ==
=== Campaign participation credit ===
American Civil War:

1. Murfreesboro
2. Chickamauga
3. Chattanooga
4. Atlanta
5. Kentucky 1862
6. Mississippi 1862
7. Tennessee 1863
8. Georgia 1864

Indian Wars

1. Little Bighorn
2. Yakima War
3. Spokane-Coeur d'Alene-Paloos War
4. Wyoming 1866
5. Wyoming 1867

War with Spain

1. Santiago

China Relief Expedition

1. Tientsin
2. Yang-tsun
3. Peking

Philippine–American War

1. Malolos
2. San Isidro
3. Zapote River
4. Tarlac
5. Luzon 1899
6. Luzon 1900
7. Luzon 1901

World War I

1. Aisne
2. Aisne-Marne
3. St. Mihiel
4. Meuse-Argonne
5. Ile de France 1918
6. Lorraine 1918

World War II

1. Normandy (with arrowhead)
2. Northern France
3. Rhineland
4. Ardennes-Alsace
5. Central Europe

Korean War

1. UN Defensive
2. UN Offensive
3. CCF Intervention
4. First UN Counteroffensive
5. CCF Spring Offensive
6. UN Summer-Fall Offensive
7. Second Korean Winter
8. Korea, Summer-Fall 1952
9. Third Korean Winter
10. Korea, Summer 1953

Vietnam War

1. Counteroffensive
2. Counteroffensive, Phase II
3. Counteroffensive, Phase III
4. Tet Counteroffensive
5. Counteroffensive, Phase IV
6. Counteroffensive, Phase V
7. Counteroffensive, Phase VI
8. Tet 69/Counteroffensive
9. Summer-Fall 1969
10. Winter-Spring 1970
11. Sanctuary Counteroffensive
12. Counteroffensive, Phase VII

Armed Forces Expeditions

1. Panama

War on terrorism:

Afghanistan:

1. Transition I

Iraq:

1. Iraqi Governance
2. National Resolution
3. Iraqi Surge
4. Iraqi Sovereignty

=== Decorations ===
- Presidential Unit Citation (Army) for BREST, FRANCE
- Presidential Unit Citation (Army) for SIEGFRIED LINE
- Presidential Unit Citation (Army) for ARDENNES
- Presidential Unit Citation (Army) for HONGCHON
- Presidential Unit Citation (Navy) for HWACHON RESERVOIR
- Navy Unit Commendation for PANMUNJOM
- Navy Unit Commendation for IRAQ 2005
- Meritorious Unit Commendation for IRAQ 2007-2008
- Meritorious Unit Commendation for IRAQ 2009-2010
- Meritorious Unit Commendation for AFGHANISTAN 2012-2013
- French Croix de Guerre with Palm, World War I for CHATEAU THIERRY
- French Croix de Guerre with Palm, World War I for AISNE-MARNE
- French Croix de Guerre with Palm, World War I for MEUSE-ARGONNE
- French Fourragère in the colors of the Croix de Guerre, World War I
- Luxembourg Croix de Guerre for LUXEMBOURG
- Belgian Fourragere 1940
- Cited in the Order of the Day of the Belgian Army for action in the ARDENNES
- Cited in the Order of the Day of the Belgian Army for action at ELSENBORN CREST
- Republic of Korea Presidential Unit Citation for NAKTONG RIVER LINE
- Republic of Korea Presidential Unit Citation for KOREA
- Republic of Vietnam Cross of Gallantry with Palm, Streamer embroidered VIETNAM 1966–1968
- Republic of Vietnam Cross of Gallantry with Palm, Streamer embroidered VIETNAM 1968–1970
- Republic of Vietnam Civil Action Honor Medal, First Class, Streamer embroidered VIETNAM 1966–1970
- Presidential Unit Citation, Company C, 4th Battalion, 24 April 1969 to 26 April 1969

=== Distinguished Members of the Regiment (DMOR) ===
By order of the Secretary of the Army, the following individuals have been officially bestowed with the title of "Distinguished Member of the 9th Infantry Regiment" for their exceptionally meritorious service and distinguished accomplishments as a member of the Regiment in accordance with Army regulations:

1. CPT Richard A. Coutermarsh, DMOR, MBA, IC, MCP, MEP, C.C.H. (1st Battalion, 9th Infantry Regiment).

2. GEN (R) Vincent K. Brooks; also serves as the Honorary Colonel of the Regiment (former commander, 2nd Battalion, 9th Infantry Regiment)

3. SMA (R) Daniel A. Dailey (2nd Battalion, 9th Infantry Regiment)

Honorary Members of the Regiment (HMOR)

By order of the Secretary of the Army, the following individuals have been officially bestowed with the title of "Honorary Member of the 9th Infantry Regiment" in recognition of their outstanding support and conspicuous service to the Regiment as a nonregimental member in accordance with Army regulations:

1. Mrs. Laura J. Coutermarsh, HMOR.

== See also ==
- List of United States Regular Army Civil War units
