= Salmon Falls Massacre =

Salmon Falls Massacre can refer to:

- Raid on Salmon Falls (1690), in present-day Maine, United States
- Utter Party Massacre (1860), in present-day Idaho, United States
