= Nicholas J. Cutinha =

Nicholas Joseph Cutinha
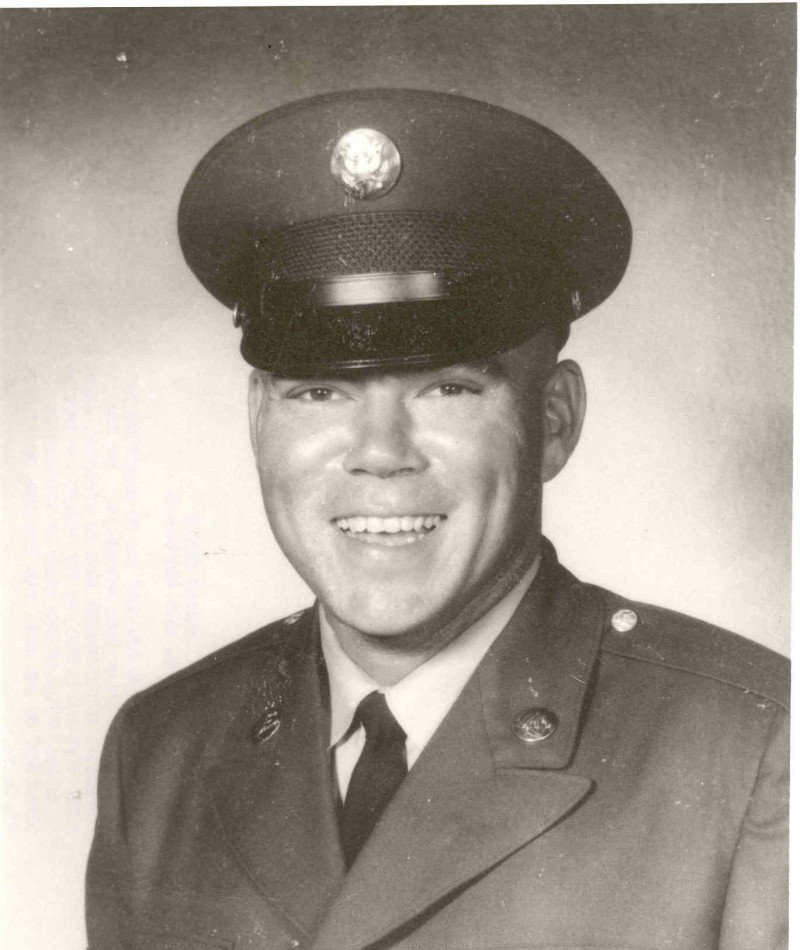
- Born: January 13, 1945; Fernandina Beach, Florida, US
- Died: March 2, 1968 (aged 23) near Gia Dinh, Republic of Vietnam
- Burial place: Fort Denaud Cemetery, Fort Denaud, Florida
- Military career
- Allegiance: United States of America
- Branch: United States Army
- Service years: 1967–1968
- Rank: Specialist Four
- Units: Company C, 4th Battalion, 9th Infantry Regiment, 25th Infantry Division
- Conflicts: Vietnam War †
- Awards: Medal of Honor; Purple Heart

Nicholas Joseph Cutinha /kuːˈtiːnə/ (January 13, 1945 – March 2, 1968) was a United States Army soldier and a recipient of the United States military's highest decoration—the Medal of Honor—for his actions in the Vietnam War.

== Biography ==
Cutinha joined the Army from Coral Gables, Florida in 1967, and by March 2, 1968, was serving as a Specialist Four in Company C, 4th Battalion, 9th Infantry Regiment, 25th Infantry Division. During a firefight on that day, near Gia Dinh in the Republic of Vietnam, Cutinha held the enemy at bay with his machine gun and provided suppressive fire to allow for the evacuation of wounded soldiers, despite his own serious wounds. Cutinha was killed during the battle and posthumously awarded the Medal of Honor for his actions.

Cutinha, age 23 at his death, was buried in Fort Denaud Cemetery in Fort Denaud, Florida.

Cutinha's Medal of Honor is under the custodianship of American Legion Post 130 in LaBelle, Florida, where it is on public display. American Legion Post 130 (Florida) is the only known American Legion Post with custodianship of a Medal of Honor. Cutinha's medal was presented to the Post by his mother so that it could be displayed and so all who view it might remember that "the price of freedom is often paid with the blood of a nation's youth". On November 22, 2008, American Legion Post 130 held a commemorative ceremony in honor of Cutinha.

== Medal of Honor citation ==
Specialist Cutinha's official Medal of Honor citation reads:

For conspicuous gallantry and intrepidity in action at the risk of his life above and beyond the call of duty. While serving as a machine gunner with Company C, Sp4c. Cutinha accompanied his unit on a combat mission near Gia Dinh. Suddenly his company came under small arms, automatic weapons, mortar and rocket propelled grenade fire, from a battalion size enemy unit. During the initial hostile attack, communication with the battalion was lost and the company commander and numerous members of the company became casualties. When Sp4c. Cutinha observed that his company was pinned down and disorganized, he moved to the front with complete disregard for his safety, firing his machine gun at the charging enemy. As he moved forward he drew fire on his own position and was seriously wounded in the leg. As the hostile fire intensified and half of the company was killed or wounded, Sp4c. Cutinha assumed command of all the survivors in his area and initiated a withdrawal while providing covering fire for the evacuation of the wounded. He killed several enemy soldiers but sustained another leg wound when his machine gun was destroyed by incoming rounds. Undaunted, he crawled through a hail of enemy fire to an operable machine gun in order to continue the defense of his injured comrades who were being administered medical treatment. Sp4c. Cutinha maintained this position, refused assistance, and provided defensive fire for his comrades until he fell mortally wounded. He was solely responsible for killing 15 enemy soldiers while saving the lives of at least 9 members of his own unit. Sp4c. Cutinha's gallantry and extraordinary heroism were in keeping with the highest traditions of the military service and reflect great credit upon himself, his unit, and the U.S. Army.

== Military awards ==
Cutinha's military decorations and awards include:

	Medal of Honor	
Purple Heart Medal	National Defense Service Medal	Vietnam Service Medal
Vietnam Campaign Medal	Gallantry Cross Unit Citation Emblem with Palm and Frame	Republic of Vietnam Civil Actions Unit Citation with Palm and Frame

== See also ==
- List of Medal of Honor recipients for the Vietnam War
