= Charles A. Coolidge =

American US Army soldier

Charles Austin Coolidge, Jr.
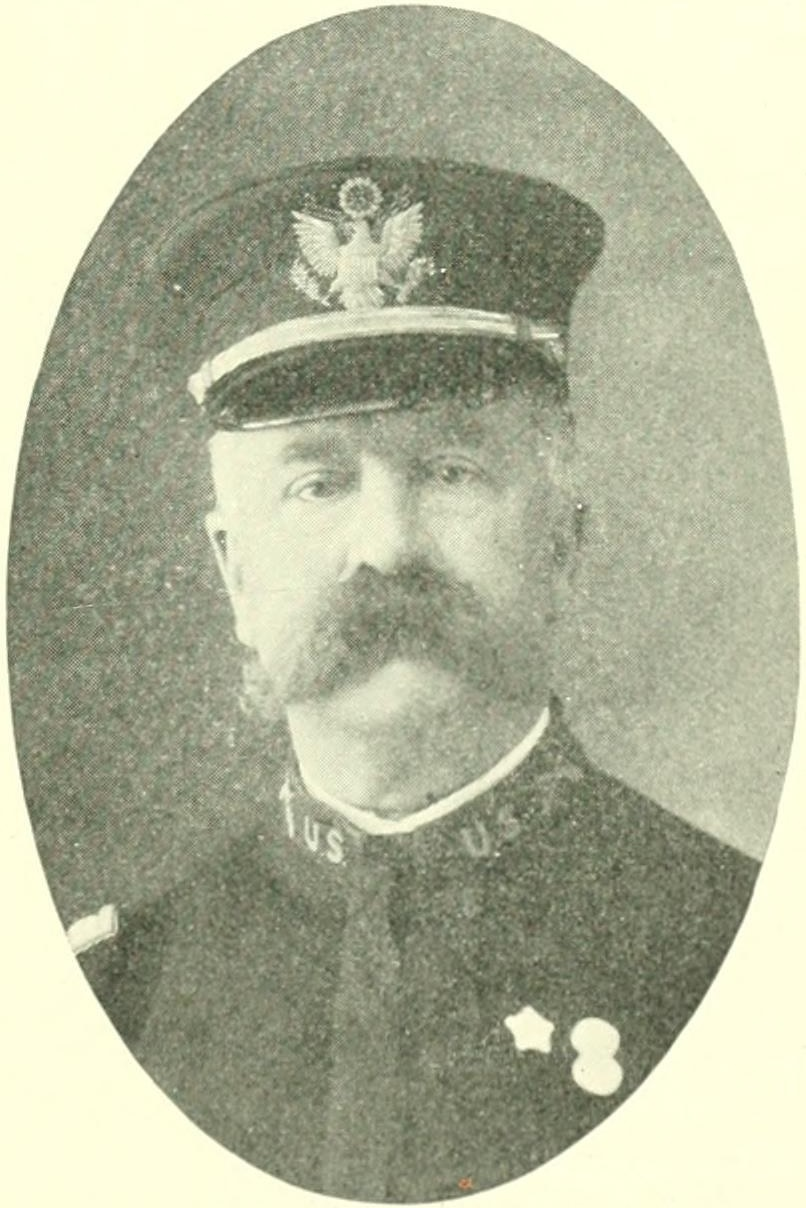
- Coolidge in Volume 2 of 1911's Norwich University, 1819-1911: Her History, Her Graduates, Her Roll of Honor.
- Born: July 19, 1844; Boston, Massachusetts, US
- Died: June 1, 1926 (aged 81); Detroit, Michigan, US
- Burial place: Arlington National Cemetery
- Military career
- Allegiance: United States of America; Union
- Branch: United States Army; Union Army
- Service years: 1862–1903
- Rank: Brigadier General
- Commands: 9th U.S. Infantry
- Conflicts: American Civil War; Indian Wars: Nez Perce War; Battle of the Big Hole; Spanish–American War: Battle of El Caney; Siege of Santiago; Philippine–American War: Battle of Zapote River; China Relief Expedition

Charles Austin Coolidge Jr. (July 19, 1844 – June 1, 1926) was a United States Army soldier who served in the American Civil War, the American West, Spanish–American War, and in Asia before retiring in 1903 as a brigadier general.

== Early life, education & marriage ==
Charles Austin Coolidge Jr. was born on July 19, 1844, in Boston, Massachusetts, to Charles Austin Coolidge Sr. and Anna Maria (Rice) Coolidge. He attended Norwich University in Northfield, Vermont, from 1859 to 1861; in 1903 Norwich conferred his bachelor's degree as a member of the class of 1863. Later he received his M.D. from the Wooster Medical College in Wooster, Ohio. He married Sophia Wager Lowry in Tallahassee, Florida, on 19 November 1867; she was the daughter of Philip Lowry and Caroline Tilghman of Philadelphia. Coolidge and his wife Sophie were the adoptive parents of Sherman Coolidge of Arapahoe ancestry who became a prominent clergyman, educator and promoter of American Indian rights.

== Military career ==
On 23 Oct 1862, Coolidge enlisted in the United States Army as a private in the 16th Massachusetts Volunteer Infantry. In May 1864 he was appointed Second Lieutenant of the Seventh Infantry Regiment. The Seventh at that time was on duty in New York, having just come from Gettysburg for the draft riots. Following a month of service at City Point, Virginia, the regiment remained at New York harbor until the end of the war. The regiment was then sent to Florida for the next five years.

After his unit was transferred to the American West in 1870, Lieutenant Coolidge was a member of Captain Rawn's command of ~25 regulars which opposed and stalled Chief Looking Glass' Nez Percé Indians at Lolo Pass. He was wounded in this campaign at the Battle of the Big Hole on August 9, 1877. Later when appointed a captain, he served in Montana, Dakota Territory, Fort Snelling, Fort D.A. Russell (Wyoming), Rock Springs, Wyoming, and Fort Logan near Denver, Colorado.

At the outbreak of the Spanish–American War in April 1898, Coolidge attained the rank of Major in the Seventh Infantry Regiment. He participated in the capture of El Caney on July 1, 1898, and the bombardment of Santiago de Cuba.

The US 9th Infantry Regiment in the Philippines, 1899

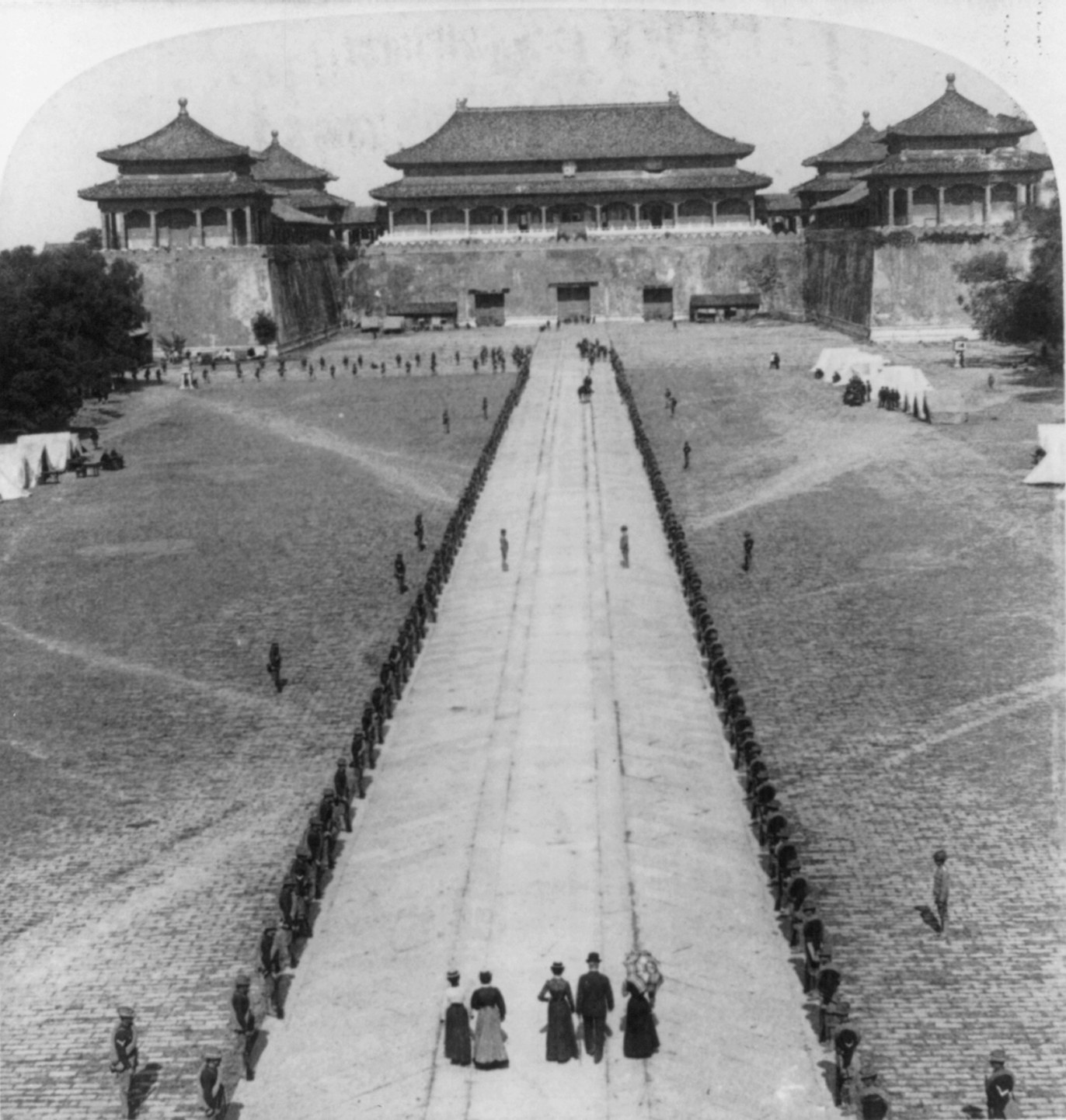
The U.S. 9th Infantry Regiment lined up before the Meridian Gate, Forbidden City, Beijing, circa 1901. American Minister Edwin H. Conger and family in foreground.

Coolidge was promoted to Lieutenant Colonel of the Ninth Infantry Regiment on May 16, 1899, and he took part in the engagements at Zapote Bridge and Tarlac, Philippine Islands. In June 1900 the regiment was ordered to China as part of the China Relief Expedition. He assumed command following the death of Colonel Emerson H. Liscum during the Boxer Rebellion as part of the Allies relief of the Legation at Tianjin from June to July 1900. After the departure of Colonel Robert Leamy Meade of the Marines from China on July 26, 1900, Lieutenant Colonel Coolidge was placed in command of the American forces in China until the arrival of General Adna Chaffee in early August 1900. Also during the Boxer Rebellion on August 14, 1900, he led the first American force to enter the Forbidden City in Beijing.

In 1901 Coolidge was named Colonel of the Seventh Infantry Regiment, transferred to the Presidio of San Francisco, where he retired August 8, 1903, as a Brigadier General.

== Retirement and death ==
Coolidge moved to Detroit shortly after the San Francisco earthquake in August 1906. He had been exceptionally active in work of military veterans' organizations and he was a member of the Loyal Legion, the GAR, Sons of the American Revolution and the United Spanish War Veterans.

He was a Councilor of the Boy Scouts of America and a President of the American Philatelic Society. He was admitted to the Detroit Post of the GAR in 1906, elected Junior Commander two years later and named Commander in 1912.

Brigadier General Charles Austin Coolidge died June 2, 1926, at Grace Hospital in Detroit, Michigan in his eighty-first year. He had been ill since May 19, 1926, when he suffered a stroke while attending the Lloyd Tilghman monument unveiling at Vicksburg, Mississippi. He was buried at Arlington National Cemetery.

== Military awards ==
General Coolidge earned the following military awards:

- Civil War Campaign Medal
- Indian Campaign Medal
- Spanish Campaign Medal
- Philippine Campaign Medal
- China Relief Expedition Medal

== Family relations & genealogy ==
Charles A. Coolidge and his wife Sophie in 1870 adopted a son, Sherman Coolidge (1862–1932) of Arapahoe ancestry, who became a prominent leader in the Native American community. General Coolidge was the son of Charles and Anna Maria Rice Coolidge. He was a direct descendant of John Coolidge (1604–1691) who emigrated from England about 1630 to Watertown, Massachusetts, and he was a cousin of President Coolidge. His grandfather Henry Rice was a member of the Boston City Council and was a Massachusetts state legislator. He was also a descendant of Edmund Rice another early immigrant to Massachusetts Bay Colony as follows:

- Brig. Gen Charles A. Coolidge (1844–1926), son of
  - Anna Maria Rice (1817–1886), daughter of

- Henry Rice (1786–1867), son of
- Noah Rice (1751–1820), son of
- Jabez Rice (1702–1783), son of

- Caleb Rice (1666–1739), son of
- Joseph Rice (1637–1711), son of

- Edmund Rice, (c. 1594–1663)
