= Edward C. Krzyzowski =

- Born: January 16, 1914; Chicago, Illinois, United States
- Died: September 3, 1951 (aged 37); Yanggu County, Gangwon Province, Korea
- Burial place: Resurrection Catholic Cemetery and Mausoleums, Justice, Illinois
- Military career
- Allegiance: United States
- Branch: United States Army
- Rank: Captain
- Units: Company B, 9th Infantry Regiment, 2nd Infantry Division
- Conflicts: World War II; Korean War: Battle of Bloody Ridge †
- Awards: Medal of Honor; Silver Star; Purple Heart

Edward Charles Krzyzowski (January 16, 1914 – September 3, 1951) was an officer in the United States Army who was posthumously awarded the Medal of Honor for his actions from August 31 to September 3, 1951 during the Battle of Bloody Ridge in the Korean War.

== Medal of Honor citation ==
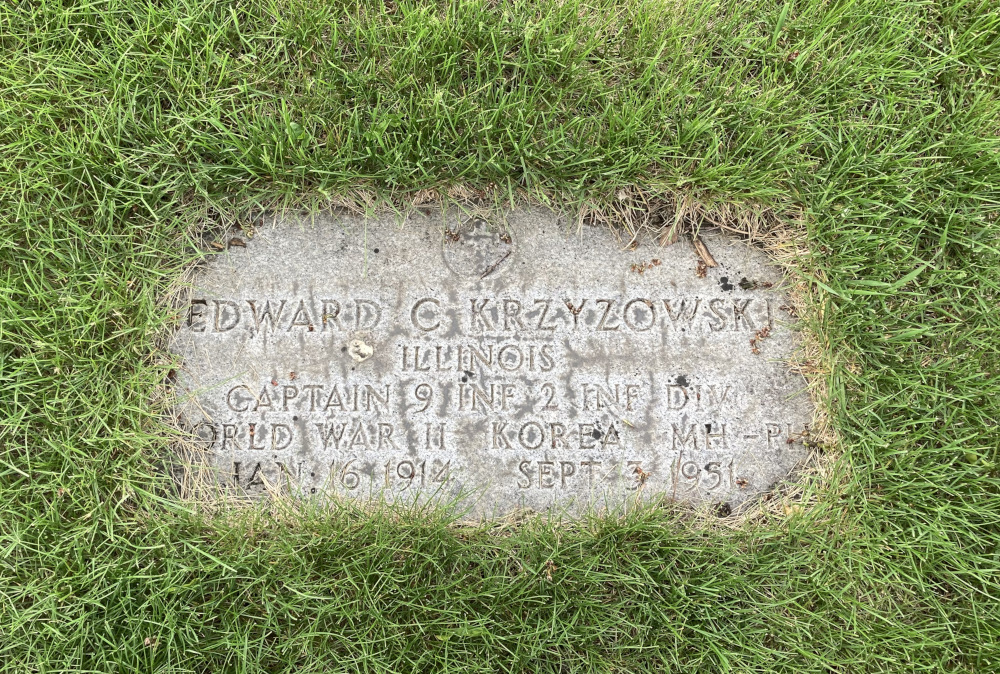
Krzyzowski's grave at Resurrection Catholic Cemetery in Justice, Illinois

Rank and organization: Captain, U.S. Army, Company B, 9th Infantry Regiment, 2nd Infantry Division

Place and date: Near Tondul, Korea, from August 31, to September 3, 1951

Entered service at: Cicero, Ill. Born: January 16, 1914, Chicago, Ill.

G.O. No.: 56, June 12, 1952.

Citation:

Capt. Krzyzowski, distinguished himself by conspicuous gallantry and indomitable courage above and beyond the call of duty in action against the enemy as commanding officer of Company B. Spearheading an assault against strongly defended Hill 700, his company came under vicious crossfire and grenade attack from enemy bunkers. Creeping up the fire-swept hill, he personally eliminated 1 bunker with his grenades and wiped out a second with carbine fire. Forced to retire to more tenable positions for the night, the company, led by Capt. Krzyzowski, resumed the attack the following day, gaining several hundred yards and inflicting numerous casualties. Overwhelmed by the numerically superior hostile force, he ordered his men to evacuate the wounded and move back. Providing protective fire for their safe withdrawal, he was wounded again by grenade fragments, but refused evacuation and continued to direct the defense. On September 3, he led his valiant unit in another assault which overran several hostile positions, but again the company was pinned down by murderous fire. Courageously advancing alone to an open knoll to plot mortar concentrations against the hill, he was killed instantly by an enemy sniper's fire. Capt. Krzyzowski's consummate fortitude, heroic leadership, and gallant self-sacrifice, so clearly demonstrated throughout 3 days of bitter combat, reflect the highest credit and lasting glory on himself, the infantry, and the U.S. Army.

== Awards and Decorations ==

Badge	Combat Infantryman Badge with Star denoting 2nd award		
1st row	Medal of Honor		Silver Star
3rd row	Bronze Star Medal	Purple Heart	American Campaign Medal
4th row	European-African-Middle Eastern Campaign Medal	World War II Victory Medal	National Defense Service Medal
5th row	Korean Service Medal with 1 Campaign star	United Nations Service Medal Korea	Korean War Service Medal Retroactively Awarded, 2003
Unit Awards	Korean Presidential Unit Citation		

== See also ==
- List of Korean War Medal of Honor recipients
