= Operation Murfreesboro =

Battle of Ma'Laab Operation Murfreesboro
- Part of the Iraq War
| Date | 18 February – 2 March 2007 |
| Location | Ramadi, Iraq |
| Result | U.S. victory: Insurgent occupying force defeated |

Belligerents
| United States (Iraq) Iraqi Army | Islamic state of Iraq Other Insurgents |

Commanders and leaders
| LTC Charles P. Ferry - Task Force 1-9 INF | |

Strength
| Approx. 200 infantry + artillery and armored support | 210 - 250 fighters in prepared defensive positions |

Casualties and losses
| (United States) 5 KIA and 25 WIA (Iraq) 10 WIA | 69 KIA; 9 WIA; 32 POW |

Operation Murfreesboro was one of the closing engagements of the Battle of Ramadi during the Iraq War and resulted in a decisive victory for the United States Forces over the Islamic State of Iraq. It is widely credited with breaking the back of the insurgency in Anbar Province, resulting in the Anbar province favoring the new Iraqi government in Baghdad.

The operation resulted from changes in the political alliance of the Sofia district of northeast Ar Ramadi, which had previously fought against U.S. forces. Due to attacks on civilians in the area by fighters with Al Qaeda in Iraq (AQI), a local sheikh allied with US forces in October 2006, and the US provided assistance establishing a local militia. That militia provided valuable assistance regarding enemy tactics and activities in the area.

Operation Murfreesboro began 20 February 2007, by setting up a full cordon around the Ma'Laab district, supported by armored vehicles, Apache helicopters, and long-range rockets (GMLRS). Able Company of the 9th Infantry provided security for 36 hours while a permanent concrete barrier was erected along "Easy Street", on the western border of the Ma'Laab district. These efforts resulted in heavy losses for the third platoon as they headed towards "Easy Street", clearing the houses along a street where an IED was believed to be hidden. The hidden IED detonated, resulting in several casualties, with subsequent difficulties evacuating wounded soldiers. This culminated in heroic actions by the Able company commander, who was awarded the Silver Star. In spite of these losses, the concrete barrier was completed in just 24 hours and the Ma'Laab district was largely pacified by mid-March, after the construction of multiple outposts in the neighborhood.

== Sofia ==
In October 2006, the 1st Battalion, 9th Infantry Regiment (1-9 IN) deployed to east Ramadi for the 2nd Brigade of the 2nd Infantry Division's second tour to Iraq. The "Manchus" were replacing the 506th Infantry Regiment (506 AR) from the 101st Airborne Division, and the 1st Armored Division (1 AD). Many soldiers of the new battalion had previously been in east Ramadi during a 2004-2005 deployment under the colors of the 503rd Infantry Regiment (1-503 IN), thus giving the Americans a slight advantage in that many of the battalion's non-commissioned officers were already familiar with the terrain.

During the summer of 2006, a local sheikh in the Sofia district of northeast Ar Ramadi began to grow weary of the attacks on civilians in the area carried out by foreign fighters sent by Al Qaeda in Iraq (AQI) and other terror groups. These attacks culminated in the murder of the sheikh's brother on 21 August. In October he sent word to the newly arrived 9th Infantry Regiment's leadership, saying that in exchange for US and Iraqi Army support, he would convert his local militia (most of whom had fought against the battalion during its previous deployment in 2004) into Iraqi police, and he would encourage other local leaders to do the same.

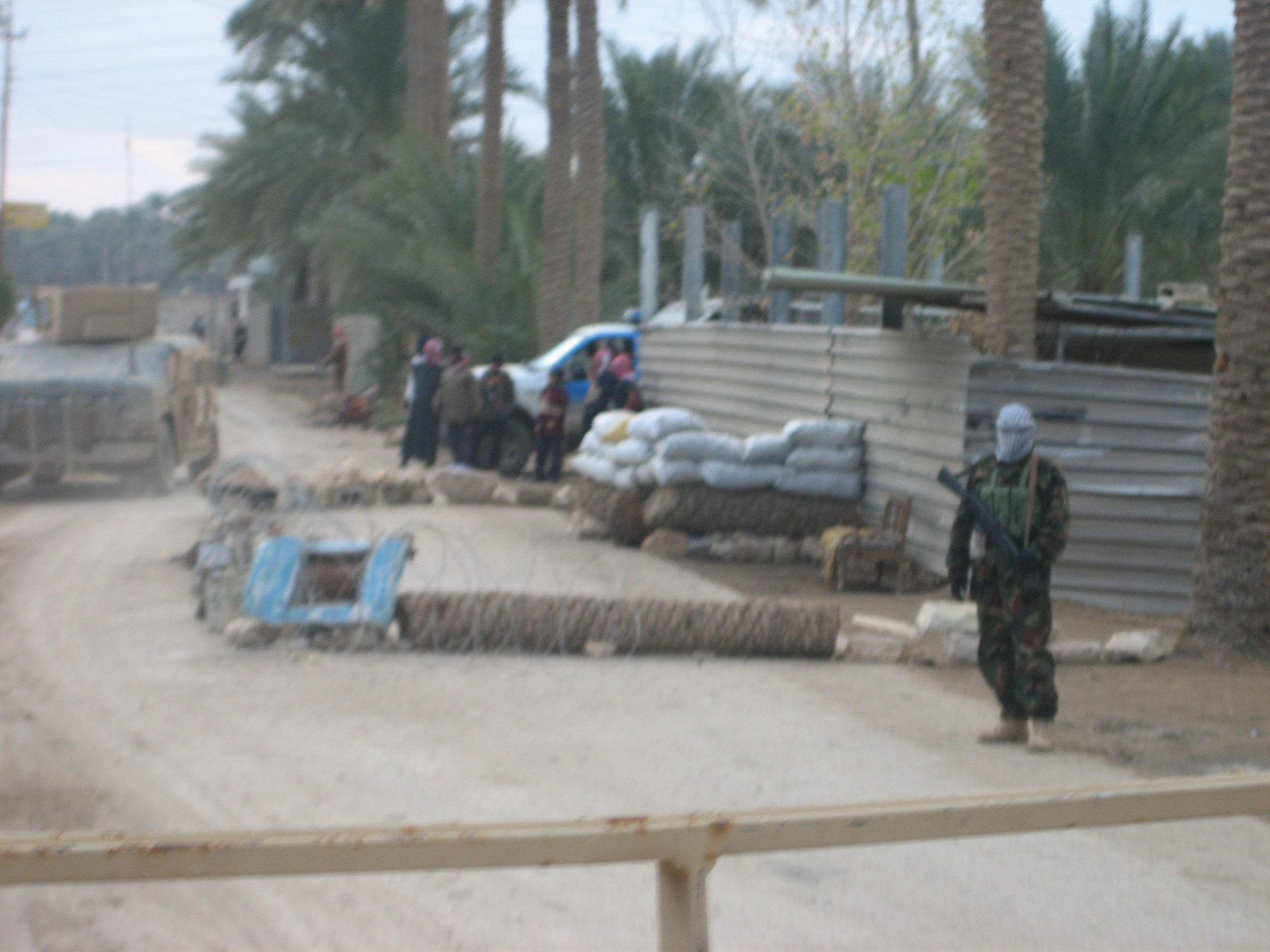
Iraqi militia checkpoint in Sofia

In mid-October 2006, al-Qaeda announced the creation of Islamic state of Iraq (ISI), replacing the Mujahideen Shura Council (MSC) and its al-Qaeda in Iraq (AQI).

Under the arrangement, the Sofia militia agreed not to attack US forces or launch mortars at any American FOB, and 1-9's battalion commander agreed to help form a militia by supplying uniforms, vehicles, food, water, weapons, and training, as well as assist the sheikh with civil affairs in his area. To accomplish this, on 4 December 2007, Able and Baker companies from 1-9 were deployed to the Sofia area, along with several companies of the Iraqi Army, to assist the battalion's Charlie company, which had been operating in the area for the preceding month and a half. Despite the heavy American presence, fighting continued against Al Qaeda forces in the area, and the Sheikhs proved their worth by providing the Americans with information on the locations and movements of terrorists and Mujahideen in the area, leading to heavy losses being suffered by the Al Qaeda backed opposition forces. While living and operating with the local militia, the soldiers of the 9th Infantry were able to learn about their enemy's tactics and activities in the area. This knowledge would prove crucial during the upcoming operations.

== Operation Murfreesboro ==
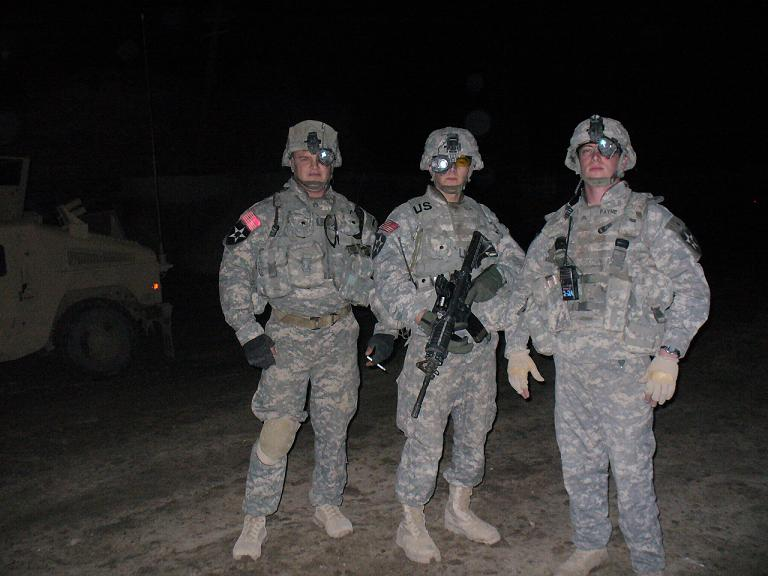
U.S. Army soldiers during Operation Murfreesboro.

This operation was one of the closing engagements of the Battle of Ramadi in 2006. In the beginning months of 2007, Task Force 1–9, composed of 1st Battalion, 9th Infantry Regiment (1-9 IN, part of 2ID), with support from Abrams main battle tanks, Bradley IFVs and dismounted infantry from B/C/D Company of 3rd Battalion, 69th Armor Regiment (3-69 AR), Navy SEALS, Bradley IFVs and dismounted infantry from 1st Battalion, 26th Infantry Regiment (1-26 IN), Charlie Company of the 321st Engineer Battalion, Lima Company of 3rd Battalion, 6th Marine Regiment (3/6 Marines), Fox Company of 2nd Battalion, 4th Marine Regiment (2/4 Marines), 504th Military Intelligence unit and infantrymen from the veteran 1/1/1 Iraqi Army, launched an offensive in East Ramadi named Operation Murfreesboro.

The operation was intended to cut off the Ma'Laab district from the rest of Ramadi in order to drive out the Al Queda forces operating with near impunity there. The operation began 20 February 2007, when tanks and IFVs from 3-69th Armor and 1-26th Infantry set up a full cordon around the Ma'Laab district, preventing any movement in or out of the neighborhood. Once this was in place, the soldiers of the 9th Infantry Regiment began conducting clearing operations and targeted raids searching for weapons, improvised explosive devices (IEDs), enemy fighters, and high level Al Qaeda leadership (HVTs) within the Ma'Laab and the neighboring Iskaan district, supported by the aforementioned armored vehicles, Apache helicopters, and long range rockets (GMLRS).

== Blacksheep Alley and the Barrier Operation ==
Plans were then made to set up a permanent concrete barrier along "Easy Street", which formed the western border of the Ma'Laab district. As the area was still very dangerous, security had to be set in place to protect the Task Force 1-9 soldiers erecting the concrete barriers, and Able Company of the 9th Infantry was tasked with providing that security. Shortly before midnight on 24 February, 3rd Platoon of Able Company departed from an American outpost on the north end of the Ma'Laab, known as Outpost Hotel, and headed towards its objective on Easy Street, where it would provide security for 36 hours while the concrete barriers were erected.

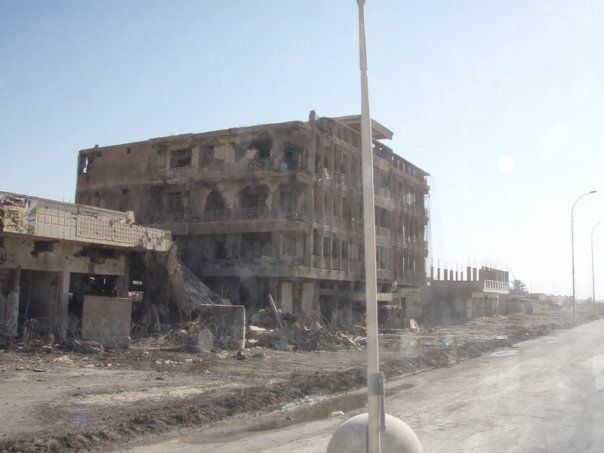
Outpost Hotel shortly after closing in late 2007

Immediately after departing the outpost, the men of 3rd Platoon discovered they were being observed by enemy fighters on the rooftops of buildings around them. Upon reaching an intersection where IEDs had been discovered the previous three consecutive nights, a Marine Corps bomb-sniffing dog was sent ahead to scout the intersection. The dog indicated twice that there was an IED hidden further down the street, and this was reported to the commander of Able Company. Via radio, the leader of 3rd Platoon requested permission to take a different route, but was instead ordered by Able Company's commander to proceed down the street where the IED was known to be hidden. 3rd Platoon reiterated the request, but was again ordered to proceed down the street after being told by the company commander that, "You are infantry, you move to contact".

Following orders, the platoon moved down the street, and began clearing the houses along the street where the IED was hidden, hoping to find the "trigger-man" whose job it was to detonate the IED. As one squad of the platoon was preparing to enter a house, the hidden IED detonated in the wall next to them, resulting in seven Americans and one Iraqi soldier being severely injured, including three American soldiers who lost at least one leg apiece in the blast. Faced with sudden 30% losses to the platoon, the remaining soldiers were overwhelmed with the tasks of providing first aid to their fallen comrades, and pulling security against further enemy attacks. The platoon had a mere 23 men to begin with, six of which had been sent immediately from basic training just one week prior, and the remaining soldiers resorted to having the less wounded soldiers assist in setting up a defensive perimeter while the remainder treated their more severely wounded comrades.

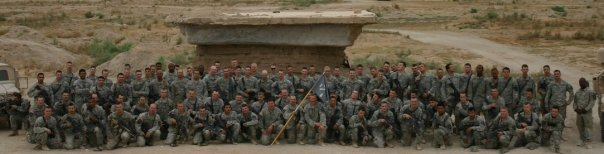
Able Company, 1/9th Infantry Regiment in late 2007

After the CASEVAC element departed, the remaining sixteen soldiers in 3rd Platoon were contacted by their company commander, again via radio, and were ordered to continue their mission, a heroic action for which the company commander was later awarded a Silver Star. Reaching their objective twenty minutes later, the remainder of 3rd Platoon began setting up their outpost for the 36-hour barrier operation, while the rest of Able Company began doing the same at other locations along Easy Street, all while under the protective cover of the tanks and Bradleys already there.

Just before dawn, 3rd Platoon suffered further casualties when, while hanging camouflage netting on a rooftop, one of their non-commissioned officers was shot in the neck by an Al Qaeda fighter. The soldier then fell three stories, resulting in severe injuries that left the soldier paralyzed from the neck down.

Despite these heavy losses, Task Force 1-9 pushed forward, and completed the construction of the permanent barrier in just 25 hours, well short of the expected 36. After a short refit, Able Company was back in the Ma'Laab district just 14 hours later, when they began the construction of permanent outposts within the neighborhood. By mid-March, the Ma'Laab had been largely pacified. Bolstered by new Iraqi police recruits and a permanent Iraqi Army presence, Able Company continued operating in the area out of four separate bases shared with the Iraqi army and police, all evenly spread throughout the district. This allowed the remainder of Task Force 1–9 to focus its attention on the surrounding neighborhoods.

== Aftermath ==
Throughout the month of February, there were more than 40 separate engagements with Al Qaeda forces, 8 large weapons caches found, more than 20 IEDs used against US and Iraqi Army forces, more than 50 IEDs located and safely disposed of, 69 enemy fighters killed in action, 9 known enemy wounded, and 32 enemy fighters captured. Together with the Iraqi Army, the local police force began to conduct patrols with gradually lessened support from coalition forces. This led to the peaceful summer months of 2007, during which no attacks of any type took place.

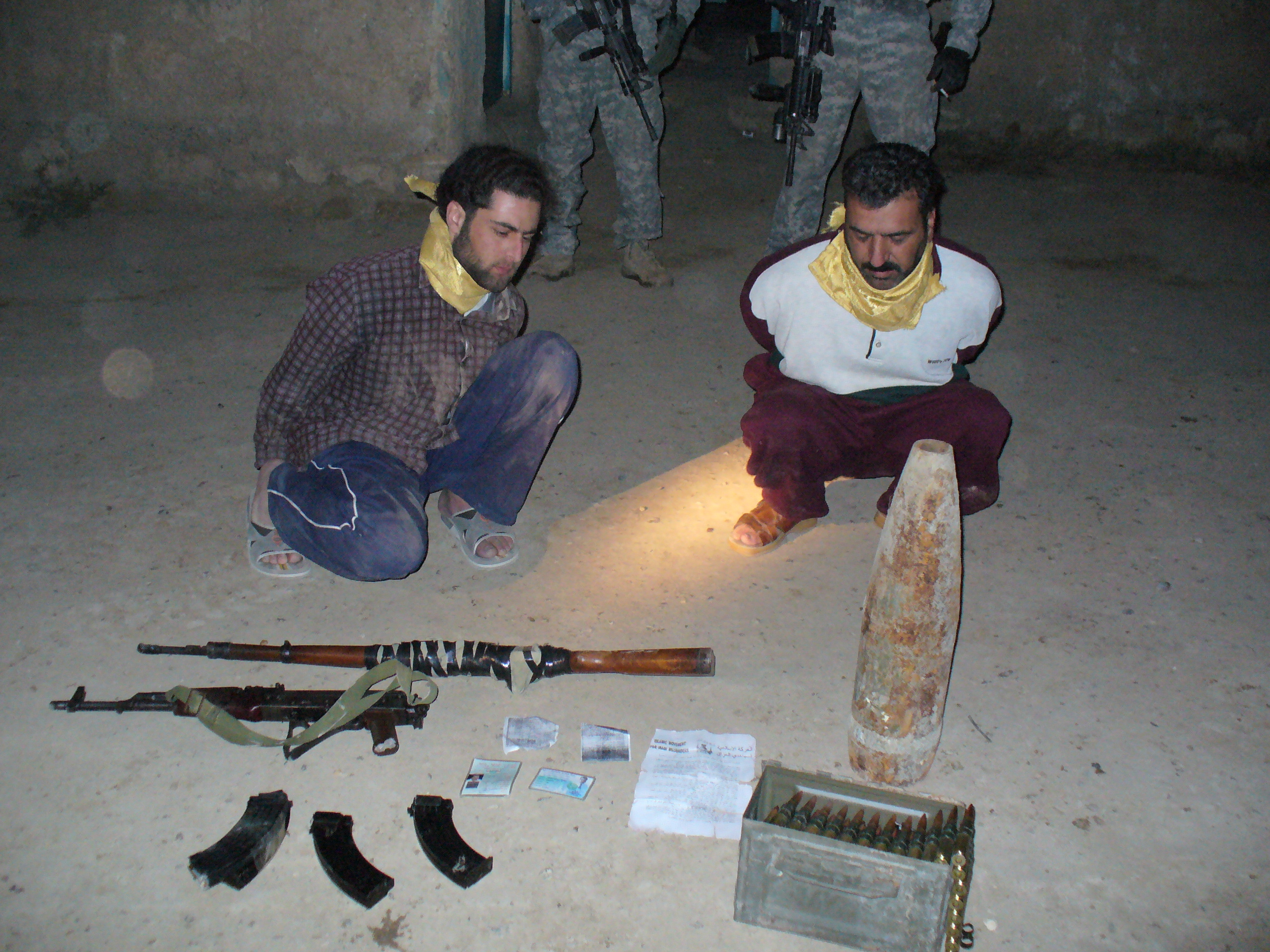
Captured insurgents

Operation Murfreesboro is widely credited with breaking the back of the insurgency in Anbar Province, as it fed the fire of the Anbar Awakening, which saw almost the entirety of Anbar province turn on the insurgency, in favor of the new Iraqi government in Baghdad. Coupled with further gains in recruiting the local leaders and militias in the surrounding areas, Anbar Province required very little assistance during the famous "surge" that took place later in 2007. The improvement was so great that it enabled Task Force 1-9 (now operating without the armored and mechanized support it had enjoyed earlier in the year) to send nearly 70% of its strength to assist other units in clearing the city of Taji, just north of Baghdad, in October 2007.

The 1st Battalion, 9th Infantry Regiment received the Navy Unit Commendation for its work in east Ramadi, and has also been recommended for a Valorous Unit Award.

== Gallery ==
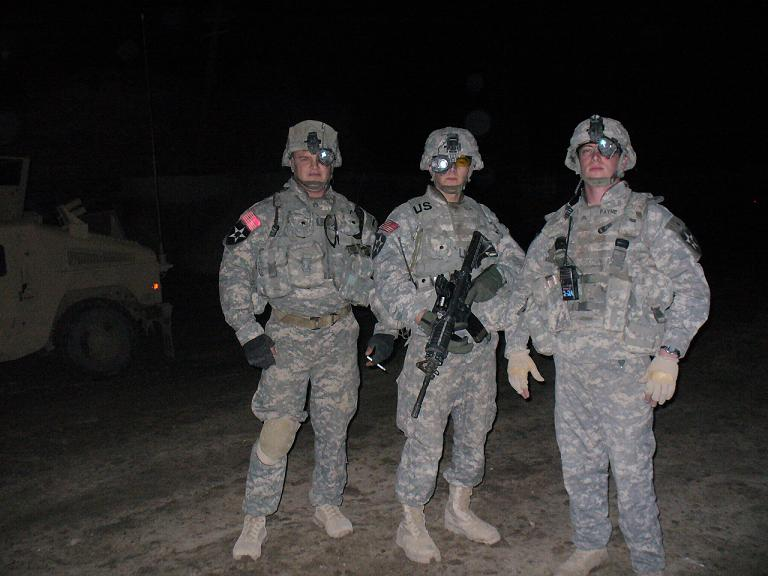
1-9 Infantry soldiers prepare for Operation Murfreesboro

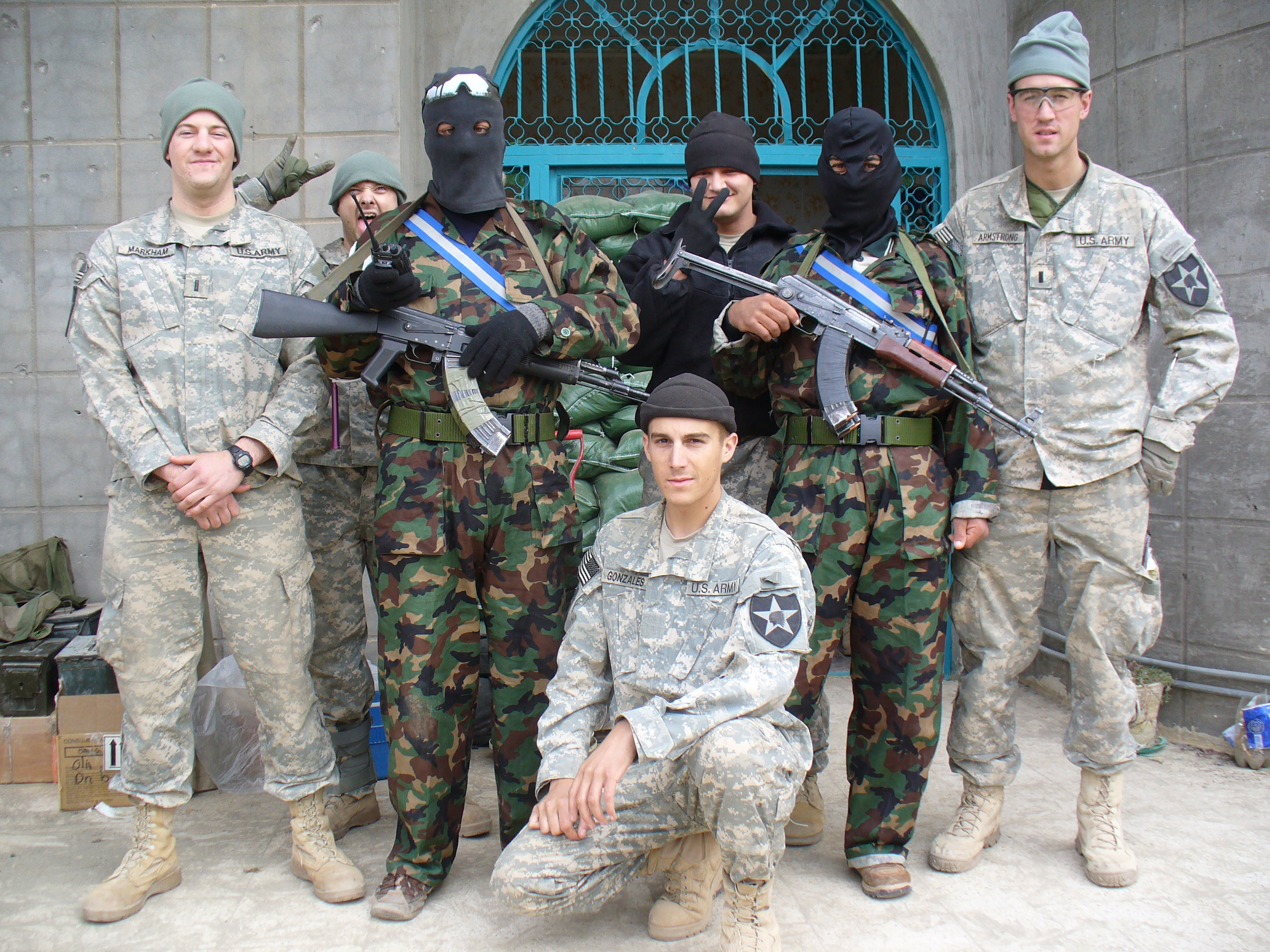
1-9 Infantry with Sofia Militia

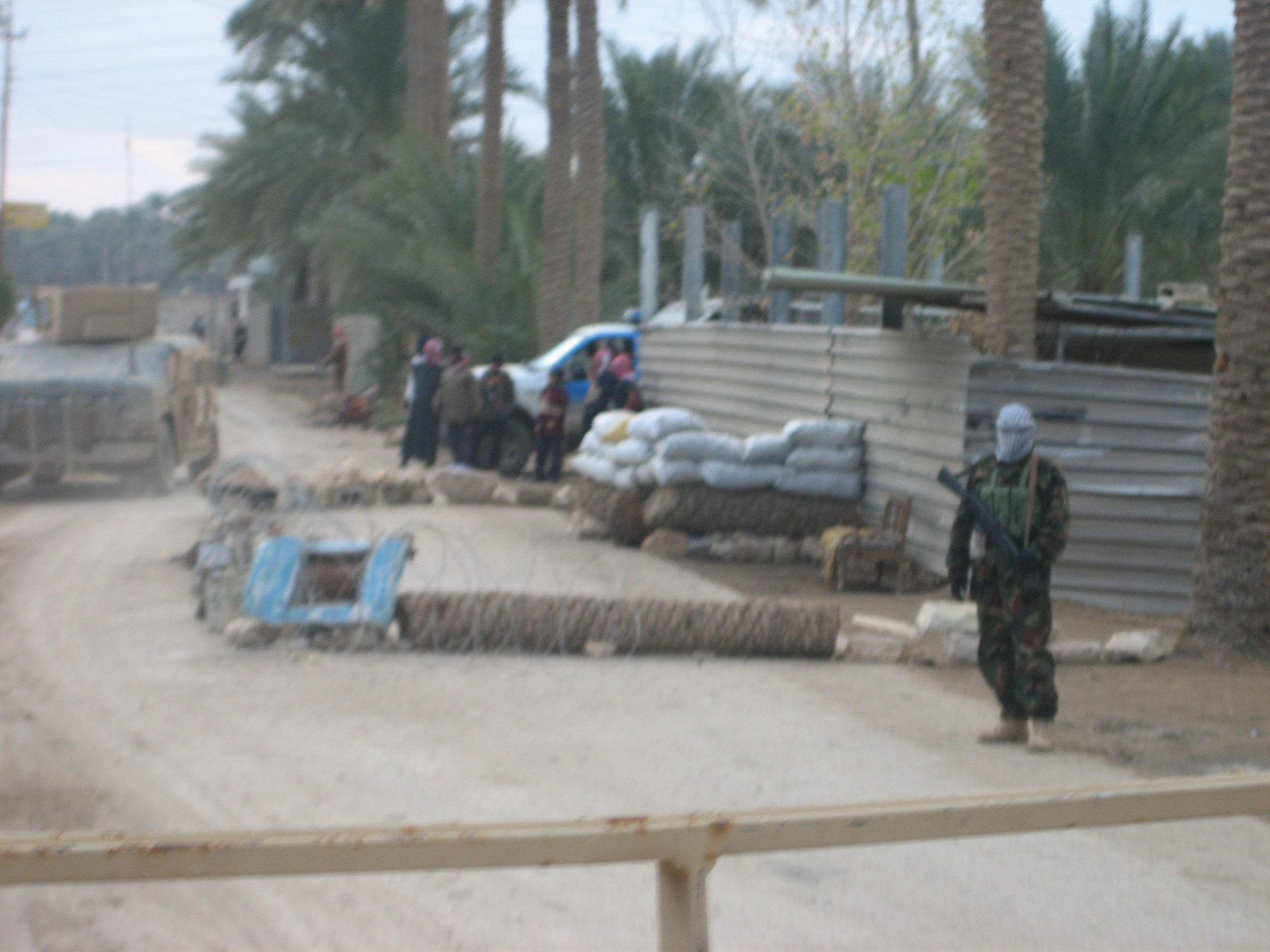
Militia Checkpoint in Sofia

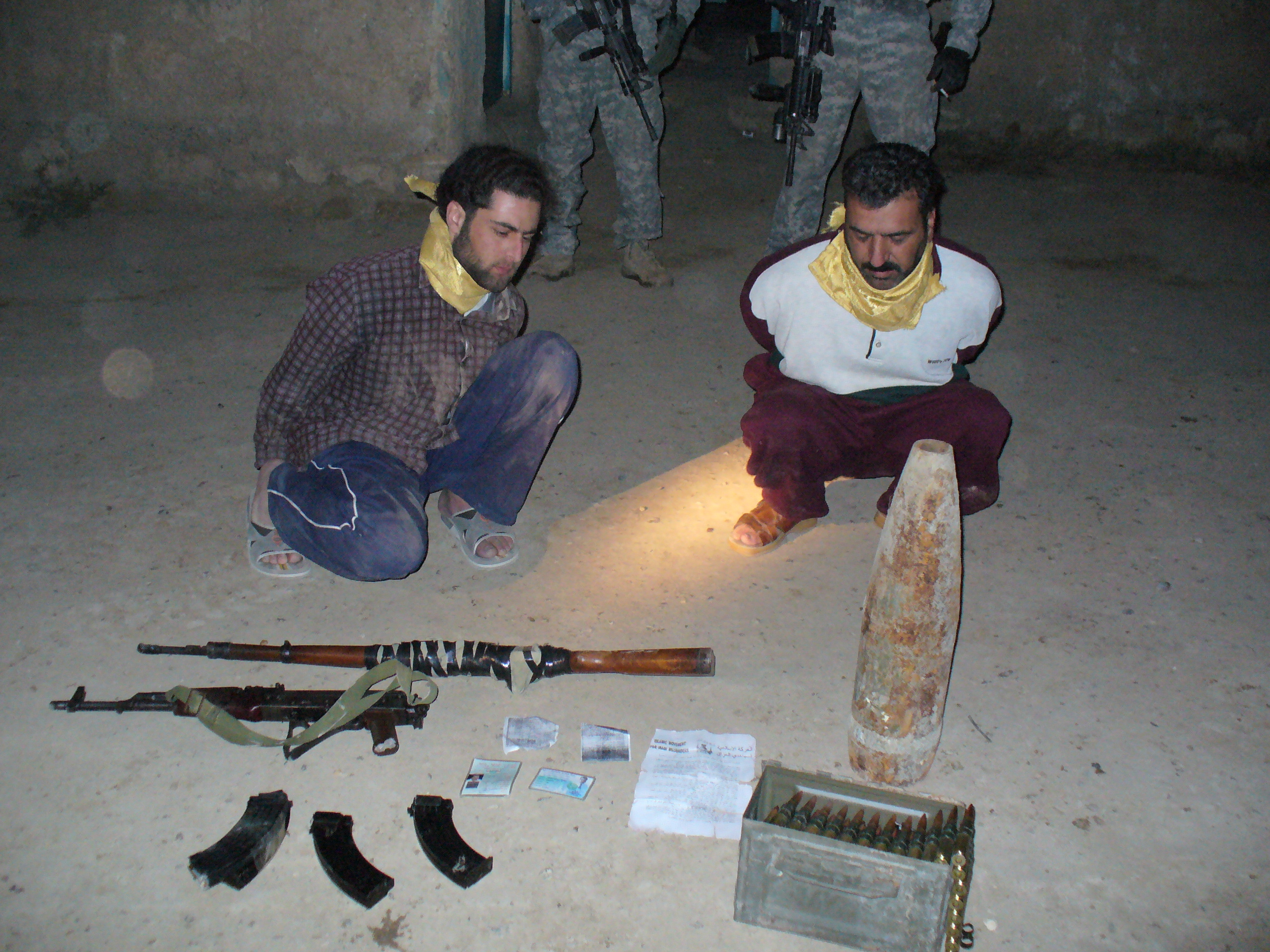
Captured Insurgents
