= George A. Crocker =

United States Army general

George Allen Crocker
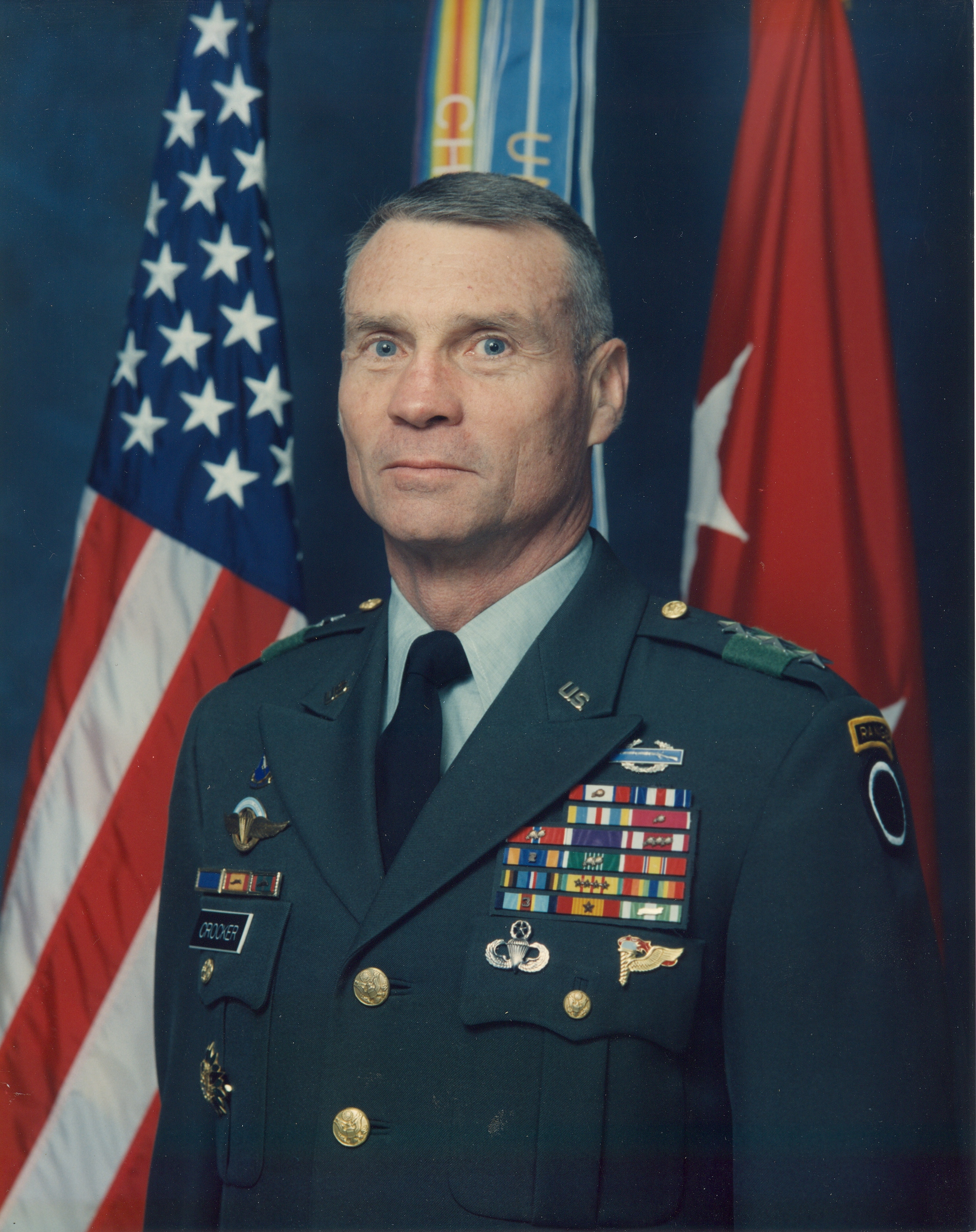
- Lieutenant General Crocker as commander of I Corps, 1996
- Born: Russellville, Arkansas, U.S.
- Military career
- Allegiance: United States of America
- Branch: United States Army
- Service years: 1966–1999
- Rank: Lieutenant General
- Commands: 82nd Airborne Division; I Corps
- Conflicts: Vietnam War; US invasion of Grenada; US invasion of Panama
- Awards: Distinguished Service Medal; Silver Star; Legion of Merit; Bronze Star with two oak leaf clusters Purple Heart; Meritorious Service Medal with three oak leaf clusters

George Allen Crocker (born 1943) is a former United States Army Lieutenant General. He was one of the army officers profiled in Rick Atkinson's book The Long Gray Line: The American Journey of West Point's Class of 1966, published in 1989.

== Early life and education ==
Crocker graduated from high school in 1961 and then spent a year at the University of Arkansas.

== Career ==
Crocker started at the West Point in July 1962 and graduated on 8 June 1966 as a second lieutenant. He elected to serve in the infantry.

=== Vietnam War ===
Crocker attended Ranger School at Fort Benning starting in September 1966, graduating on 12 November 1966. He was assigned to the 9th Infantry Division which was being deployed to South Vietnam.

In late January 1967 Crocker arrived at Bien Hoa Air Base, South Vietnam and then went by truck to Củ Chi Base Camp. Immediately on arrival at Củ Chi he was sent to join a company of the 27th Infantry Regiment for training in the field. During this time he assumed command of a platoon when the platoon leader he was shadowing was hit by shrapnel and earned his Combat Infantryman Badge.

Crocker joined the 9th Infantry Division at Đồng Tâm Base Camp and took command of a platoon of the 3rd Battalion, 47th Infantry Regiment. He was awarded the Silver Star for leading his platoon on a successful night ambush on 3 May 1967.

In June 1967 Crocker's 6-month field command came to an end and he then became staff officer responsible for air operations for the 3rd Battalion (S3-Air).

On 19 June 1967 during Operation Concordia 6 companies from the 3rd and 4th Battalions, 47th Infantry Regiment engaged the Vietcong in Cần Giuộc District and the command & control UH-1 Crocker was flying in was shot down by small arms fire and crash-landed in a paddyfield, they were rescued shortly afterwards by another UH-1. Crocker was shot down and rescued again twice more that day. The 47th Regiment lost 46 dead and claimed 250 VC killed in the operation.

In September 1970 Crocker, now a Captain began his second tour in Vietnam serving as an adviser to the Army of the Republic of Vietnam (ARVN) 42nd Ranger Battalion based in Cần Thơ. During this tour he was superficially wounded by a sniper bullet to the head and later contracted Typhus which led to him being sent back to the U.S. for several weeks to recover. On his return to Vietnam he had been replaced as adviser to the ARVN Rangers and he became aide to Lieutenant General William J. McCaffrey, the deputy commander of United States Army Vietnam based at Long Binh Post.

=== 1970s to 1999 ===
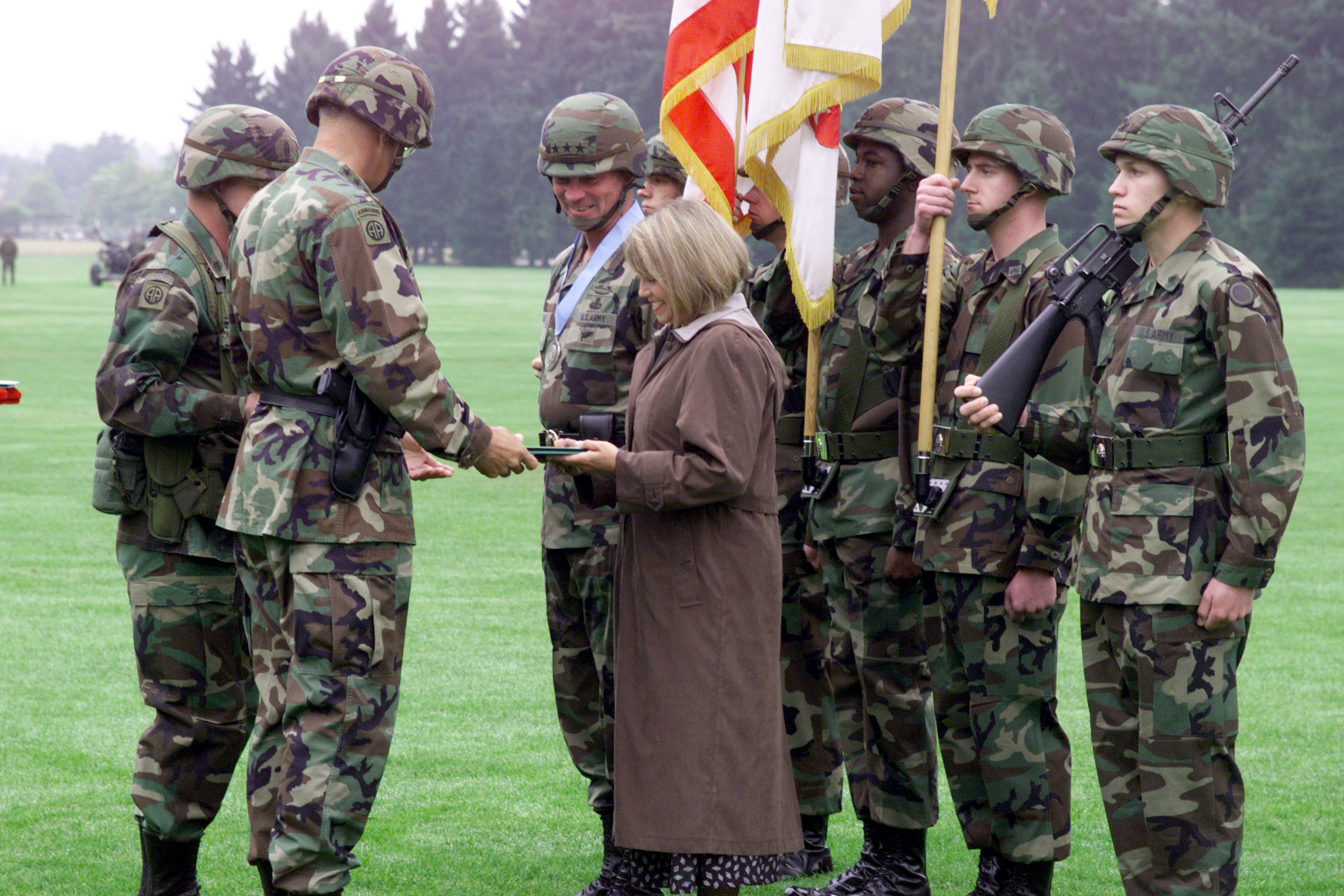
Vonda Crocker is presented with the decoration for Distinguished Civilian Service during George Crocker's retirement ceremony

In late 1971 Crocker was transferred to the Seventh Army at Ferris Barracks, Erlangen, West Germany serving first as a Battalion operations officer and then commanding an infantry company.

In mid-1974 Crocker attended Command and General Staff College and then graduate school at Duke University obtaining a master's degree in psychology and counselling.

On 1 July 1976 Maj. Crocker became a tactical officer at West Point.

Crocker commanded the 1st Battalion, 505th Parachute Infantry Regiment during the US invasion of Grenada.

On 15 May 1985 he was seriously injured during a night parachute drop near the Canoochee River when he was blown into trees, suffering 12 broken ribs and a collapsed lung.

In July 1985 he became operations officer (G3) of the 82nd Airborne Division.

During 1986 he attended the Army War College.

In October 1987 Col. Crocker took command of the 1st Brigade, 82nd Airborne Division.

Crocker served as commander of the 82nd Airborne Division from 10 March 1995 to 27 November 1996.

In 1996 he was promoted to Lieutenant General and appointed as Commander of I Corps at Fort Lewis. In March 1999, Crocker oversaw the court martial of Major General David Hale.

Crocker retired from active service in September 1999.

== Personal life ==
He married Vonda Jones, a graduate of the University of Arkansas on 29 June 1966. Their daughter Cheryl was born in December 1966 and their son was born in 1974.

After retiring from the U.S. Army in 1999, he returned to Arkansas.
