= David Hale (general) =

United States Army general

David R. E. Hale
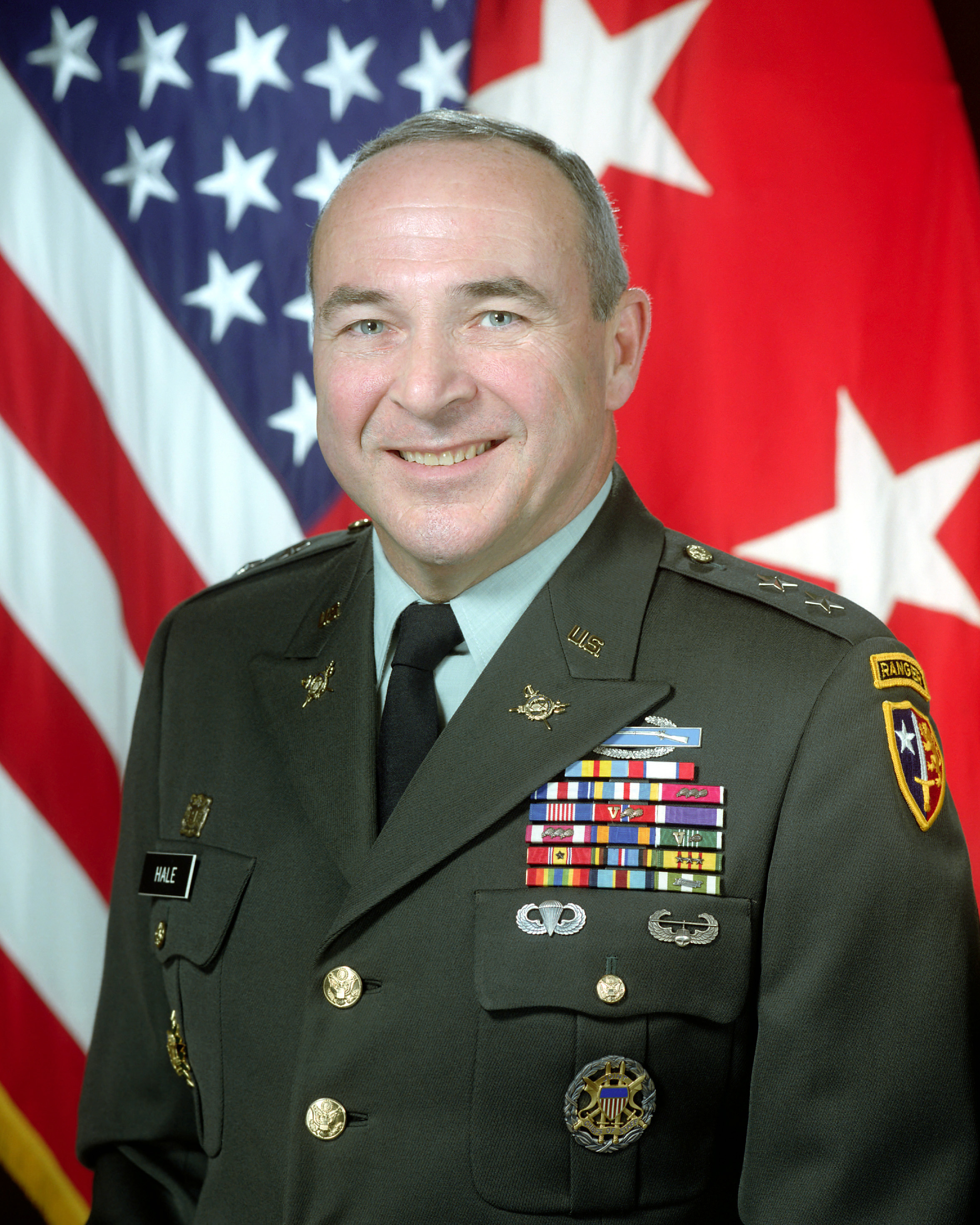
- Hale as a Major General in 1997
- Born: October 26, 1945 (age 80)
- Military career
- Allegiance: United States of America
- Branch: United States Army
- Service years: 1967–1999
- Rank: Brigadier general
- Conflicts: Vietnam War
- Awards: Silver Star

David Richard Evan Hale (born October 26, 1945) is a retired United States Army brigadier general. He was a major general when he retired, but was convicted in a court-martial of eight offenses and demoted one rank. He is the second Army general to be court-martialed since the Uniform Code of Military Justice went into effect in 1951 (after Major General Robert W. Grow in 1952) and the first Army general prosecuted after retirement.

Hale graduated from the United States Military Academy in 1967 and served as a company commander in the 82nd Airborne Division in the Vietnam War. In Vietnam, he was awarded the Silver Star for picking up an enemy grenade in a foxhole and throwing it away during a firefight. In 1989, he led the 9th Infantry Regiment of the 7th Infantry Division during the United States invasion of Panama (Operation Just Cause). Later posts included Chief of Technology Management for the Office of the Chief of Staff of the United States Army, deputy director for Political-Military Affairs of the Joint Chiefs of Staff, Deputy Commanding General for the United States Army Pacific (1994–1996), senior U.S. officer, NATO Allied Land Forces South-Eastern Europe and finally Deputy Inspector General of the Army in November 1998. His responsibilities in his last posting included investigating personal misconduct.

After his marriage of 29 years broke down in 1996 and 1997, Hale had affairs with the wives of four of the officers under his command. In 1998, charges of adultery were brought against him by Donnamaria Carpino, the wife of Colonel Madden, Hale's subordinate in Izmir, Turkey. Hale accused her of stalking him and sued for defamation of character. After only four months as Deputy Inspector General, however, he retired from the Army with an honorable discharge on February 28, 1999, with the charge still under investigation.

In the wake of "a string of military sex scandals" and under public and congressional pressure (from Senator Olympia Snowe of Maine), Hale's court-martial began in March at Fort Lewis, Washington, under Lieutenant General George A. Crocker. Hale pleaded guilty to seven counts of "conduct unbecoming an officer" and one count of making false official statements. He was demoted one rank to brigadier general and fined. In May 1999, he married Melina Maka, one of the women involved.

In addition to the Silver Star, Hale was also awarded the Defense Superior Service Medal, the Legion of Merit, the Soldier's Medal, the Bronze Star for Valor, the Bronze Star Medal, and the Purple Heart.
