= Utter Party Massacre =

1860 attack by Native Americans on the Oregon Trail

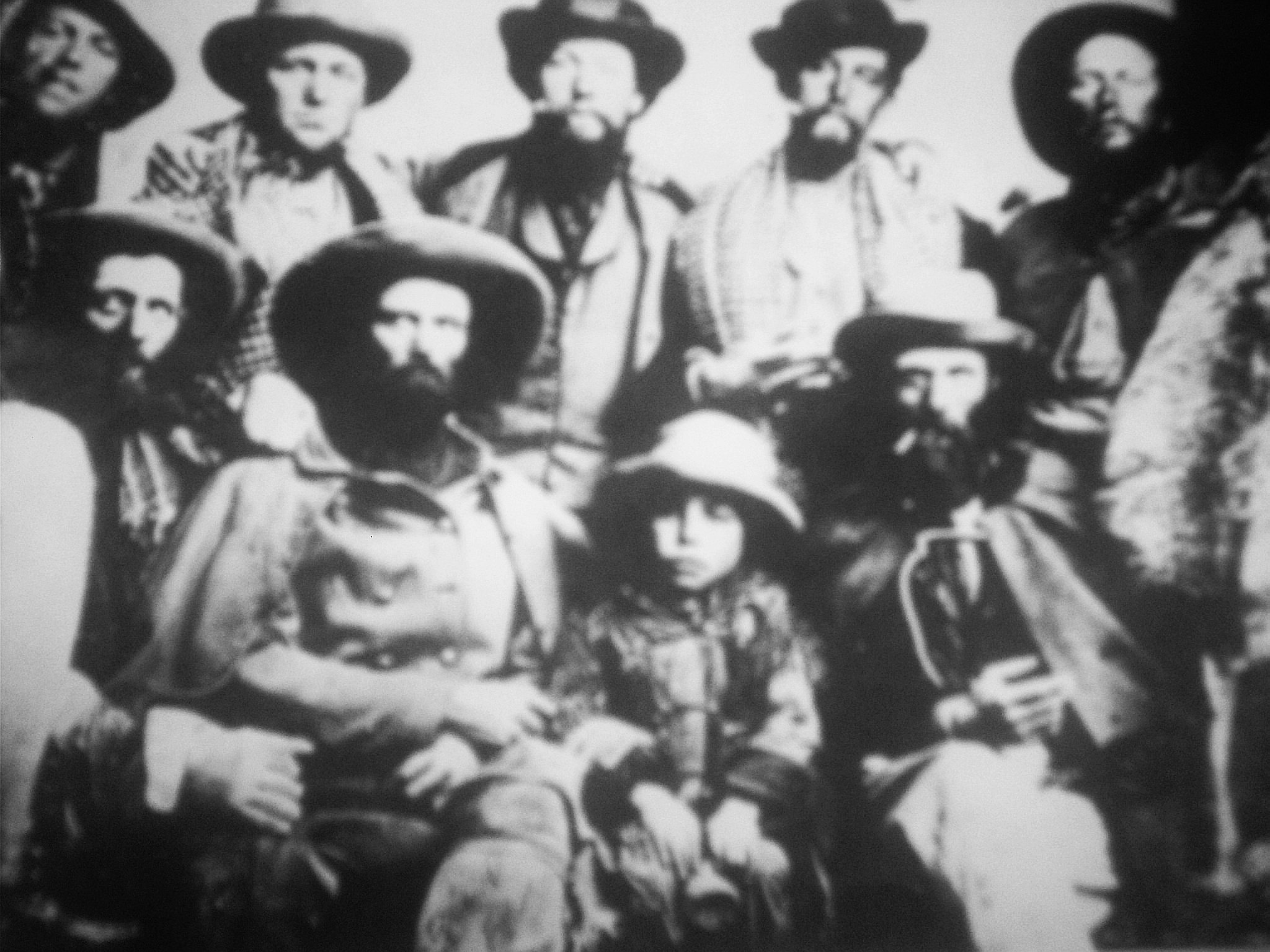
- The boy (front, center) was said to be Reuben Van Ornum after being rescued from captivity.
- Date: September 9, 1860
- Location: Fork of the Oregon Trail, Washington Territory (modern day Idaho), United States
- Also known as: Van Ornum party massacre, Myers massacre, Utter train massacre, Salmon Falls Massacre, Sinker Creek Tragedy
- Type: Attack
- Target: Emigrant group
- Participants: 44 emigrants
- Outcome: 29 killed or captured; 10 survivors found in a dire state

The Utter Party Massacre was an attack by Native Americans on September 9 or 13, 1860, that killed or captured 29 of a group of 44 emigrants on a fork of the Oregon Trail in Washington Territory (modern day Idaho), United States. Ten survivors were found on October 24, 1860, emaciated and eating the disinterred remains of a party member. Historian Charles Henry Carey described the attack as "more atrocious than any that had preceded it". It was noted as a "rare [occasion] when Indians not only attempted but sustained a prolonged assault on encircled emigrant wagons".

== Name ==
The incident has been referred to by many names. Some have referred to it by family names of party members, including the Van Ornum party massacre, the Myers massacre, the Utter train massacre, and other variations.

It has also been referred to by its location, including Salmon Falls Massacre (referring to Salmon Falls on the Snake River) and the Sinker Creek Tragedy.

The Interstate 84 road sign lists it as the Van Ornum Battle site.

== See also ==
- List of incidents of cannibalism § 1860s

== Bibliography ==
- Carey, Charles Henry (1922). History of Oregon. Vol. 1. Pioneer Historical Publishing Company.
- McArthur, Scott (2012). The Enemy Never Came: The Civil War in the Pacific Northwest. University of Nebraska Press. ISBN 9780870045707.
- Schlicke, Carl P. (Spring 1987). "Massacre on the Oregon Trail in the Year 1860: A Tale of Horror, Cannibalism & Three Remarkable Children" (PDF). Columbia Magazine. 1 (1): 33–43.
- "Site of Utter Party Massacre" (PDF), Reference Series: Number 233, Idaho State Historical Society, History.Idaho.gov, June 1993
