= Theodore Wint Grave =

Cemetery sculpture in Arlington National Cemetery

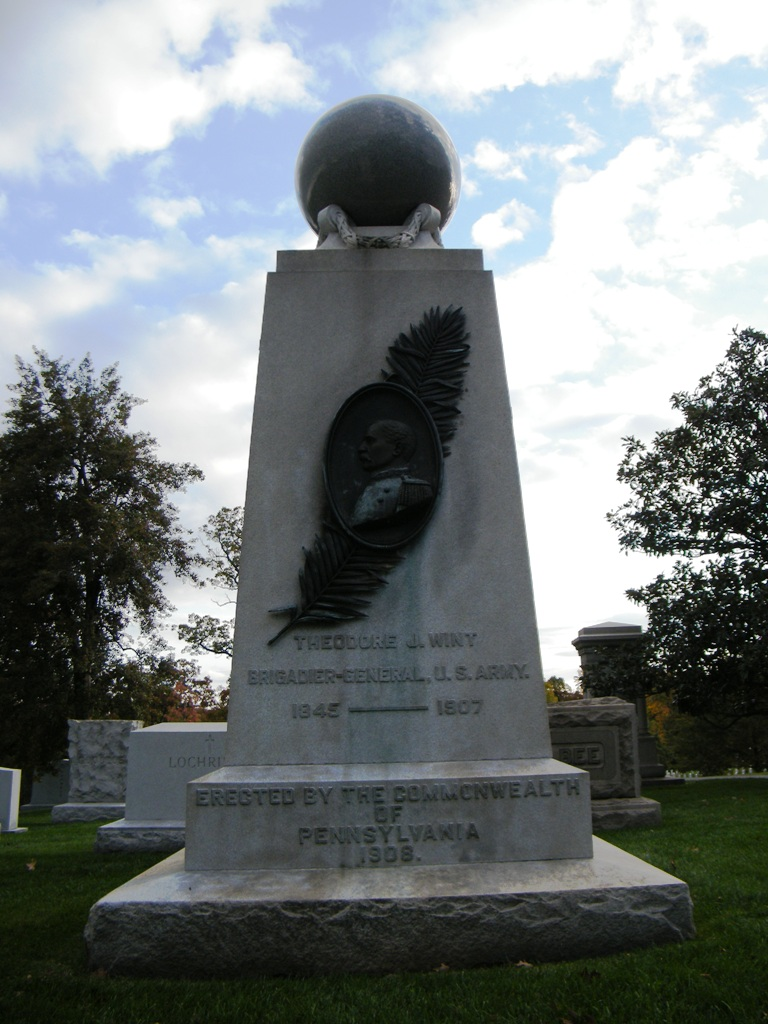
- Year: 1908
- Type: Bronze & Barre Granite
- Dimensions: 3.0 m × 1.5 m × 1.5 m (10 ft × 5 ft × 5 ft)
- Location: Arlington, Virginia, United States; 38°52′47.65″N 77°4′26.34″W
- Owner: Arlington National Cemetery

Theodore Wint Grave is a public artwork by an unknown artist, located at Arlington National Cemetery in Arlington, Virginia, United States. This sculpture was surveyed in 1995 as part of the Smithsonian's Save Outdoor Sculpture! program. "Theodore Wint Grave" serves as the final resting place for Brigadier General Theodore J. Wint.

== Description ==
This granite marker feature a profile bust relief of Brigadier General Theodore J. Wint in military uniform with epaulets on the proper left shoulder. The relief is placed in an oval shape with palm fronds extending from the top and bottom. This bronze relief is placed on a tall, column like, multi-tiered unit that has a polished sphere on the top. The sphere rests on top of a rope or chain design. The rear of the base has a plaque of the Seal of Pennsylvania.

The front of the base, below the relief is inscribed:

THEODORE J. WINT
BRIGADIER GENERAL U.S. ARMY
1845--1907
ERECTED BY THE COMMONWEALTH
OF
PENNSYLVANIA
1908

One side of the base is inscribed:

SERVED IN
CIVIL WAR

which is followed by five battle sites and dates.

The other side of the base is inscribed:

SIXTH PENNSYLVANIA CAVALRY

which lists his ranks and outfits below it.

The bottom of the Seal is inscribed:

VIRTUE
LIBERTY AND
INDEPENDENCE

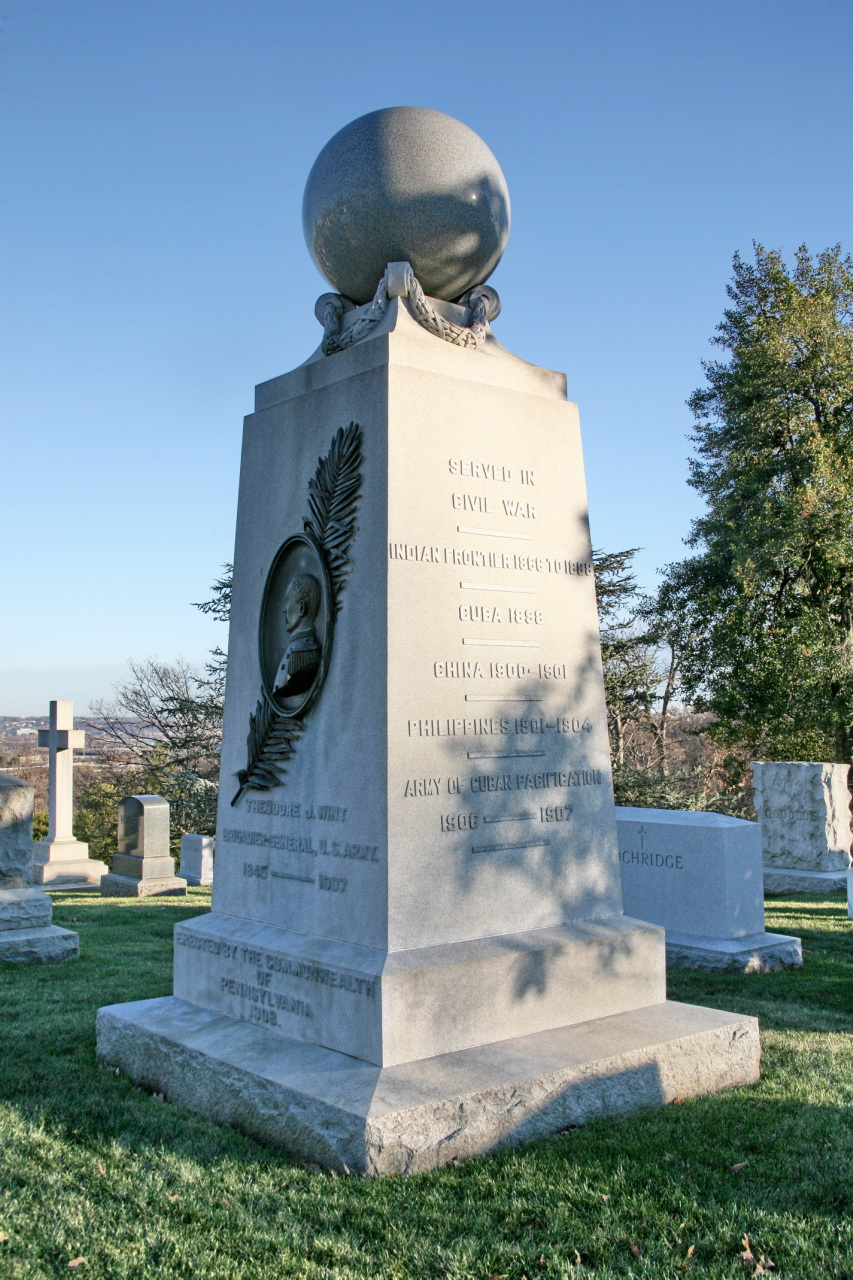
Proper left & Front

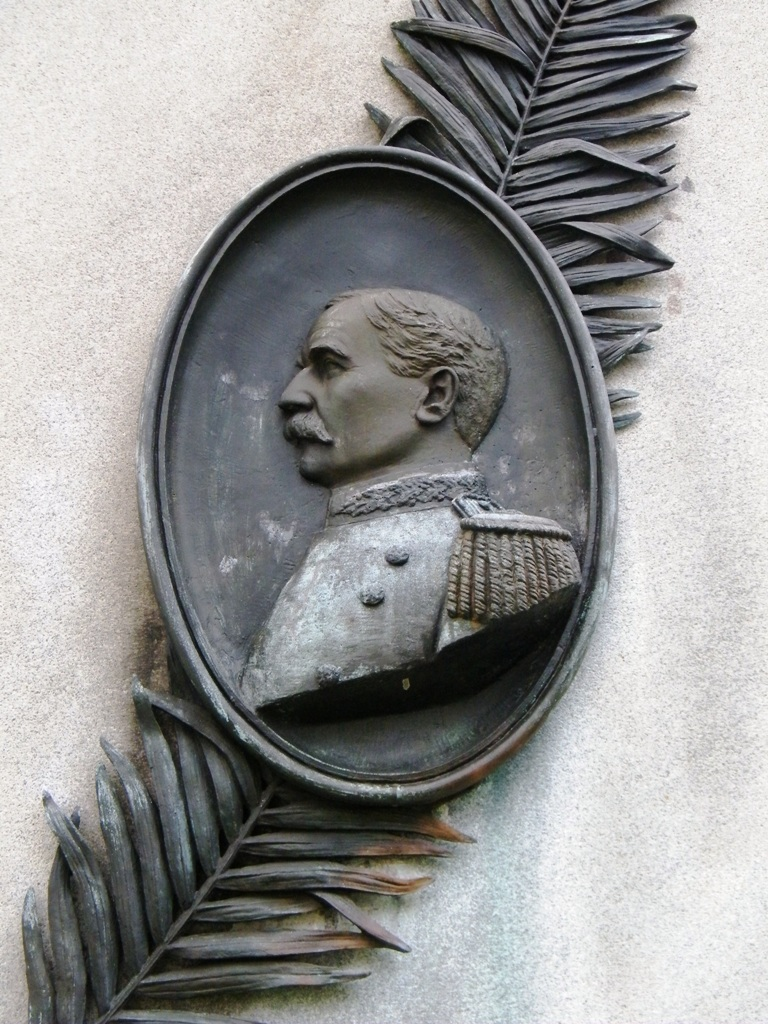
Detail

== Information ==
Born in Pennsylvania in March 1845, Theodore Jonathan Wint served with the 6th Pennsylvania Cavalry during most of the American Civil War; he joined the mounted service as a Private in February 1865. On November 24 of the same year he was appointed to the Army as Second Lieutenant of the 4th Cavalry. On May 9, 1866 he was promoted to First Lieutenant, to Captain on April 21, 1872. After continuing to gain rank, his final title was Brigadier General on June 9, 1902.

Wint served the United States Army in the American Civil War, American Indian Wars, Spanish–American War and the Philippine–American War. He also served in China (1900–1901). He was injured in the Battle of Santiago de Cuba when a Mauser bullet broke his thighbone.

Wint, along with John D. Miles, selected the site of Fort Reno in Indian Territory in July 1874. Situated on the south side of the North Canadian River five miles west of present-day El Reno, Oklahoma, this fort was established after the Cheyenne uprising of 1874 to protect Darlington Indian Agency (located directly north across the river).

Theodore Jonathan Wint married Lydia Porter Bullis in 1880. Dying in Philadelphia in March, 1907, of heart disease, he was buried with full military honors. A train traveled from Philadelphia to Union Station and then proceeded to the cemetery. Lydia is buried nearby and died in 1913. He was scheduled to retire in 1909 and was months away from his final promotion to Major General.

Upon his death William Howard Taft, who was United States Secretary of War at the time, described him as "a quiet man who did things."

Fort Wint in the Philippines was named after him as well as VFW Gen. Theodore J. Wint Post 25 in Scranton, Pennsylvania. A street at Fort Leavenworth is also named after him, Wint Avenue.

== Acquisition ==
This grave marker, located in Section 2, was erected by the Commonwealth of Pennsylvania in 1908 and was fabricated by Worden Brothers Monument Manufacturing Company.

== Condition ==
This sculpture was surveyed by Save Outdoor Sculpture! in 1995 and was described as needing treatment. In 2004 Ponsford Ltd., a private conservation and restoration group, were commissioned to wash and wax the Wint memorial along with selected other graves by Arlington National Cemetery.

== See also ==
- Grave of Emerson H. Liscum, a neighboring gravestone and memorial to Emerson H. Liscum
