= James Partington =

James Partington may refer to:

- J. R. Partington (James Riddick Partington, 1886–1965), British chemist and historian of chemistry
- James Edge Partington (1854–1930), British anthropologist
