= Liscum Bowl =

Sterling silver punch bowl set

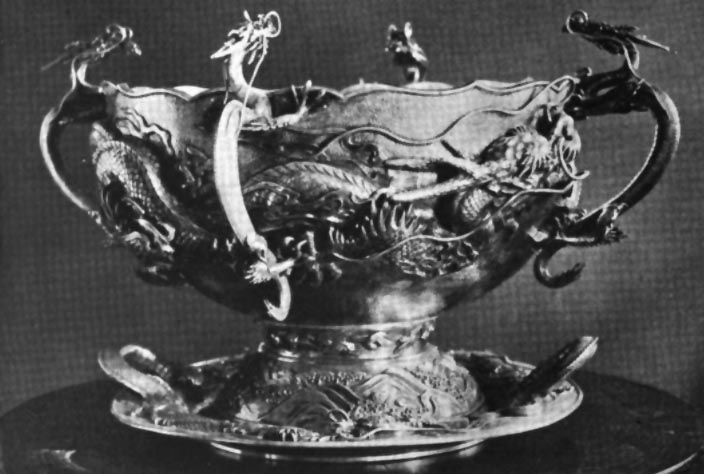
- The Liscum Bowl, circa 1909
- Artist: Arthur & Bond Company
- Completion date: 2 November 1902
- Medium: Sterling silver
- Dimensions: (1'9" in × 3'3" in)
- Weight: 95 pounds (43 kg)
- Location: Fort Carson, Colorado; 38°33′20″N 104°50′33″W
- Owner: 9th Infantry Regiment

The Liscum Bowl is a sterling silver punch bowl set made in 1902 from bullion gifted to the 9th Infantry Regiment by order of Chinese statesman Li Hongzhang in gratitude for the Americans' assistance to the Qing dynasty in the Boxer Rebellion. The bowl was dedicated to Colonel Emerson H. Liscum, the regiment's commander killed at the Battle of Tientsin on 13 July 1900.

The punch bowl, among the largest of its kind, is described by the U.S. Army as "one of the foremost trophies of any American regiment." For many years, it was on display in the 2nd Infantry Division Museum in Korea, where it was the most valuable item in the collection, worth upwards of $2.5 million. In 2018, the Liscum Bowl was moved to Fort Carson, Colorado.

== Details ==
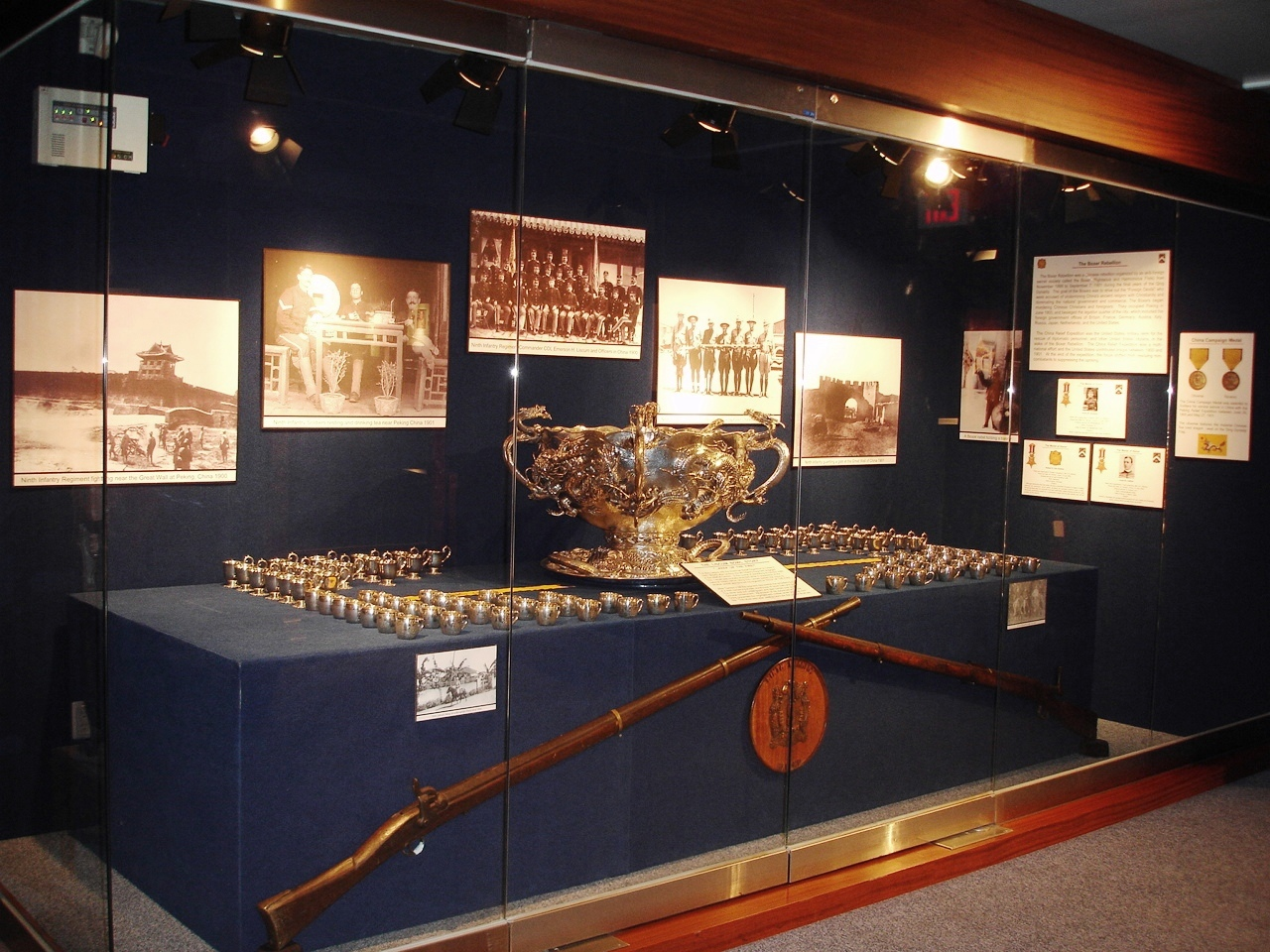
Liscum Bowl set on display, 2nd Infantry Division Museum, Korea

The silver set includes the bowl, the ladle, the tray and several dozen cups, and stylistically is of the late Meiji period. The set weighs 95 pounds (43 kg) and the bowl is 2'4" in diameter, 3'3" from handle to handle and is 1'9" in height. It has a capacity of approximately 15 gallons. The ladle is 2'1½" in length. The four handles consist of four Imperial dragons peering over the edge of the bowl, a design suggested by the regiment.

A report on the Liscum Bowl in a 1920 issue of The Jewelers' Circular journal described it as such: "The chasing and repoussé work in intertwined dragons, the same forming the four handles on the outside of the big bowl, on the immense heavy ladle, which holds nearly a pint, are said to be excellent examples of the best work of this kind in Japan."

The bowl is engraved with the name of Colonel Liscum and the date of his death, which established a tradition. The silver cups bear the engraved names of all officers who served with the Regiment in Asia between 1900 and the Korean War.

== History ==
The United States was part of the Eight-Nation Alliance formed in response to the violent anti-foreign and anti-Christian uprising that took place in China between 1899 and 1901, and was known as the Boxer Rebellion, Boxer Uprising or Yihequan Movement. The United States, Great Britain, France, Imperial Russia and Imperial Japan were among the nations that sent armies to China to protect their citizens and merchants from attacks by the "Boxers."

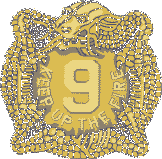
The 9th Infantry Regiment adopted Liscum's last words, "Keep up the fire," as its motto.

Several thousand members of the 9th Infantry Regiment, along with a few hundred Marines, were the only Americans deployed to China. Colonel Emerson H. Liscum was the commander of the 9th Infantry Regiment. During the Battle of Tientsin to retake control of the city on 13 and 14 July 1900, Liscum was mortally wounded by a Boxer sniper while the regiment attacked the city walls. Liscum directed his forces to "Keep up the fire!" on the walls of the city before he died. Liscum's famous last words were adopted as the regiment's official motto.

After the fall of the city, it was divided into different districts controlled by the members of the Eight-Nation Alliance. With parts of the city still burning, looting and "official seizures" of property and valuables were occurring. On 15 July, two days after the fall of Tianjin, a government mint full of silver bullion and coins was discovered in a burned building in the American sector. The mint was immediately placed under guard by the 9th Infantry, and its contents were estimated at $376,000 (equivalent to approximately $14,551,200 in 2025 dollars). However, when the bullion was removed from the mint, the heat from the fire had caused several of the bars to fuse together, resulting in large molten masses of silver. Two of these misshapen formations were the last to be rescued from the mint.

The last two molten formations, weighing a combined 90 pounds (41 kg), were later presented to the 9th Infantry Regiment by order of Chinese statesman Li Hongzhang, as an expression of appreciation from the Qing government to the regiment for their actions in helping retake the city and protecting the mint's contents from pillage.

The regiment's officers held an informal meeting on what to do with the fused silver and decided to construct a legacy trophy in the form of a punch bowl. Before the regiment departed Beijing, Chinese silversmiths constructed 52 cups from part of the silver. After the regiment returned to the Philippines in April 1902, the remainder of the fused silver was sent to Yokohama, Japan, care of Arthur & Bond Company, a fine arts gallery and manufacturer that catered mainly to foreigners and English expatriates. Japanese silversmiths working for the company spent eight months creating the ornate bowl, the ladle and the circular tray, based on the specific instructions forwarded by the regiment.

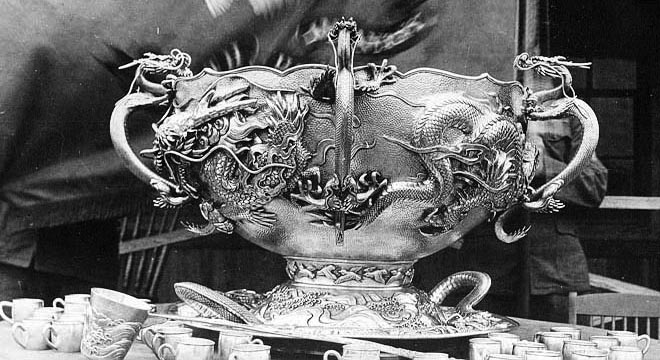
Liscum Bowl, circa 1907

The set was completed on 2 November 1902. It first went on display in the window of Arthur & Bond Company, and the ladle was stolen. Part of the ladle was quickly recovered from the thief, who had managed to break off part of it and sell it. He was sentenced to seven years in prison. It was repaired and the set was sent to the United States, transported by a U.S. cruiser via the Suez Canal and finally presented to the regiment at Madison Barracks, New York, in April 1903.

Over the years, the Liscum Bowl traveled with the regiment and went on display for many years. It was stored in a vault at a San Antonio bank during World War I and World War II.

In 2003, it underwent much needed restoration work at Creative Metalworks in Maryland, which described its condition: "One hundred years after its creation, the bowl was in dire need of restoration: dented, crushed and battered, full of lead solder from poorly executed prior repairs, and missing talons and other segments of the ornate dragons."

After a thorough restoration, the Liscum Bowl was on display at the US Army Center of Military History in Washington, D.C. It was returned to Korea in 2006, where it resided at the Camp Red Cloud museum for 12 years.

In 2018, the Liscum Bowl was permanently moved to Fort Carson, Colorado. Col. Liscum had spent time in Colorado Springs, Colorado prior to the Boxer Rebellion. It was unveiled in an official ceremony, where one of Col. Liscum's descendants spoke.
