= Grave of Emerson H. Liscum =

Sculpture in Arlington National Cemetery, Virginia

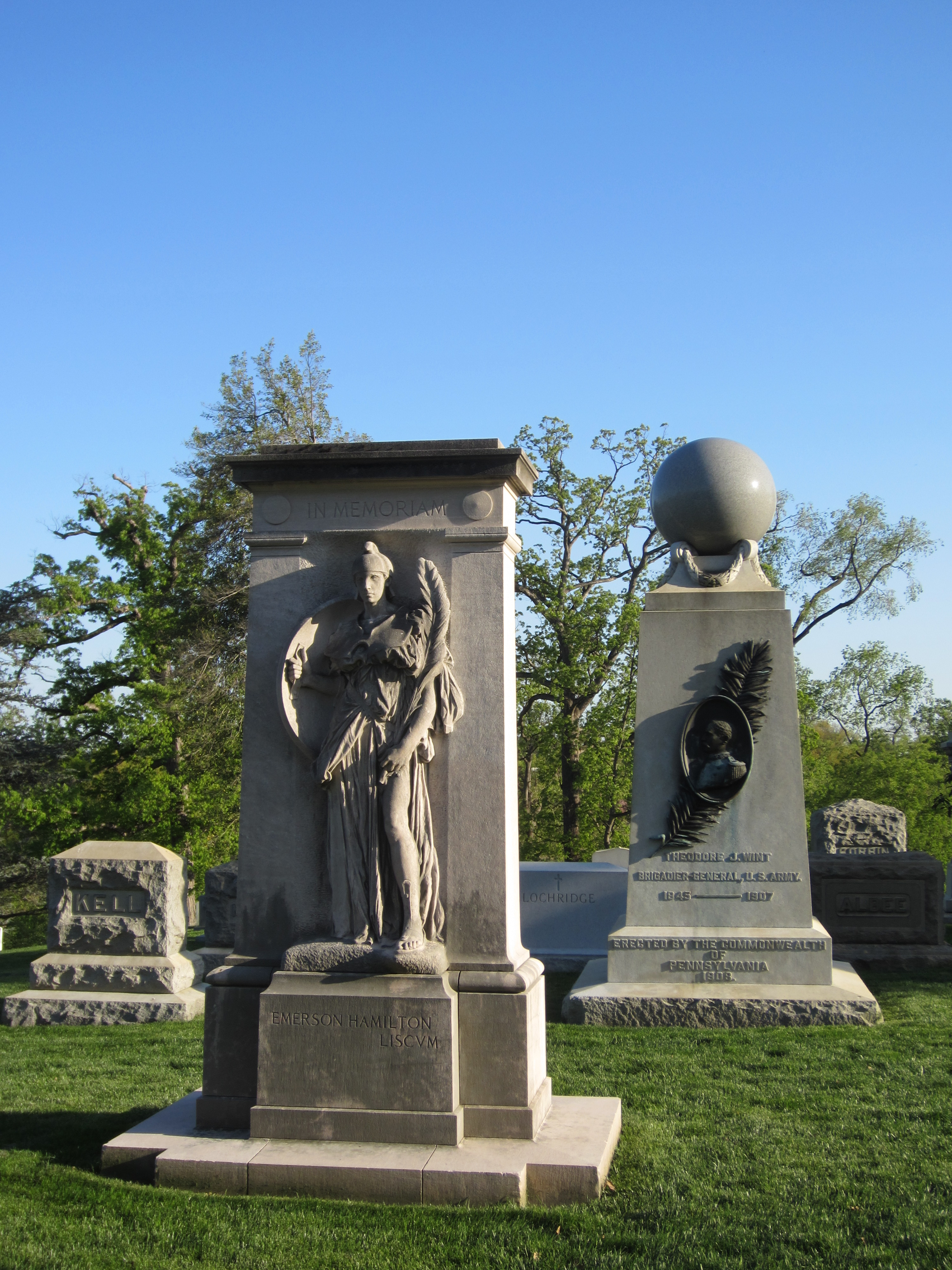
- Liscum's grave (left) and Theodore Wint Grave (right), 2013
- Location: Arlington, Virginia; 38°52′48″N 77°04′26″W

The grave of Emerson H. Liscum, also known as Emerson Hamilton Grave, is an outdoor public artwork located at Arlington National Cemetery in Arlington, Virginia, United States. This sculpture was surveyed in 1995 as part of the Smithsonian Institution's "Save Outdoor Sculpture!" program. The gravestone marks Liscum's final resting place.
