= Monteith (bowl) =

Type of vessel used to cool glasses

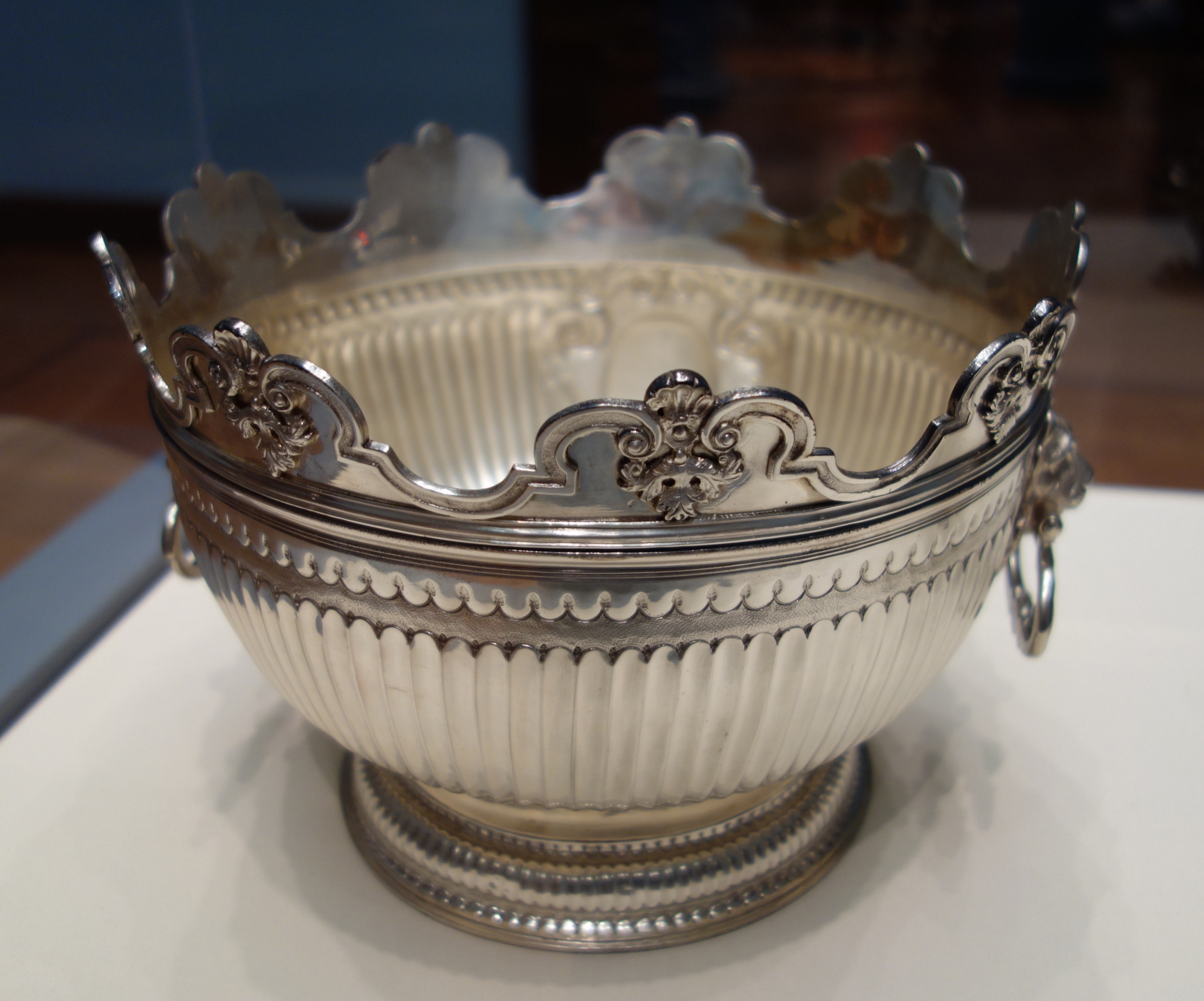
Silver monteith by John Leach, London, 1704-1705

A monteith (also known as a "Monteth", "Menteth", "Mounteth" and a "Moonteeth") is a vessle with a notched rim from which glasses would be hanged off to cool in ice water in the middle.

== Ethymology ==
The item's name allegedly comes from a scotman who lived in the late 17th century named "Monsieur Monteith" who wore a cloak with a notched edge ("u u u u" shaped design) at the bottom.

== Description ==
Monteiths are large circular silver bowls with a notched rim. Iced water is placed in the bowl and wine glasses are "hooked" by the foot in these notches to be cooled. The use of notches stopped glasses from rolling and clashing into one another.

Glasses are thus cooled in a Verriere fashion. Wine or later punch would be drunk from the glasses.

== History ==
Before notched rims were used, there were bowls without notches with the same use.

Monteiths started being built in the 1680s. The earliest monteith type was decorated with flat-chased chinoiserie and/or fluted panels beneath the notches. There was an applied foot-rim that was plain or gadrooned.

Punch became a fashionable drink around 1700, and the rim became detachable so that it could be transformed into a punch bowl. They also had lion's mask drop-rings and more elaborate ornaments, including shells, scrolls, masks and cherub's head on the rims alongside fluting and gadrooning over the body. The popularity of the monteith during the 18th century was because heavily spiced food was eaten in England at the time, and a cold drink was needed to combat the spiciness.

Monteiths became less popular around the 1730s, likely because glasses had smaller foots which made it harder to suspend them on the rim, but they were revived in the late 18th-early 19th century in France, with some being made in Sheffield plate in the 1780s.

They again became popular in the late 19th-early 20th century as presentation pieces, notably as wedding presents.

Nowadays, monteiths are rare and valuable, especially those from North America or Ireland.
