= Sydney Cove =

Bay in Sydney Harbour, Australia

Coordinates: 33°51′31″S 151°12′42″E

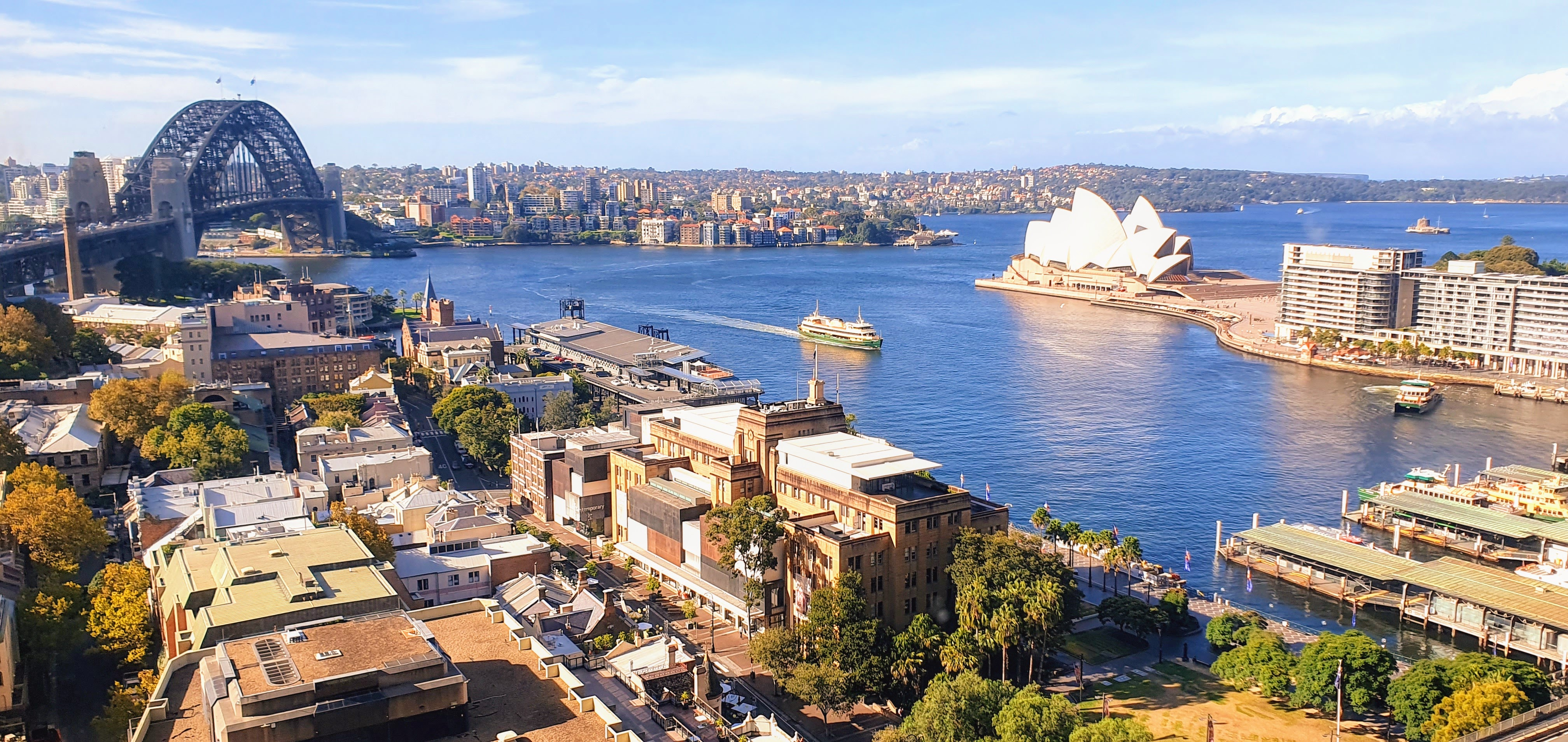
Sydney Cove, Circular Quay

Sydney Cove (Dharuk: Warrane) is a bay on the southern shore of Sydney Harbour, one of several harbours in Port Jackson, on the coast of Sydney, New South Wales. Sydney Cove is a focal point for community celebrations, due to its central Sydney location between the Sydney Opera House and the Sydney Harbour Bridge.

Sydney Cove was the site of the First Fleet's landing on 26 January 1788 and the subsequent raising of the Union Jack, a seminal date in Australian history now marked as Australia Day.

Sydney Cove, Port Jackson in the County of Cumberland – from a drawing made by Francis Fowkes in 1788

== History ==
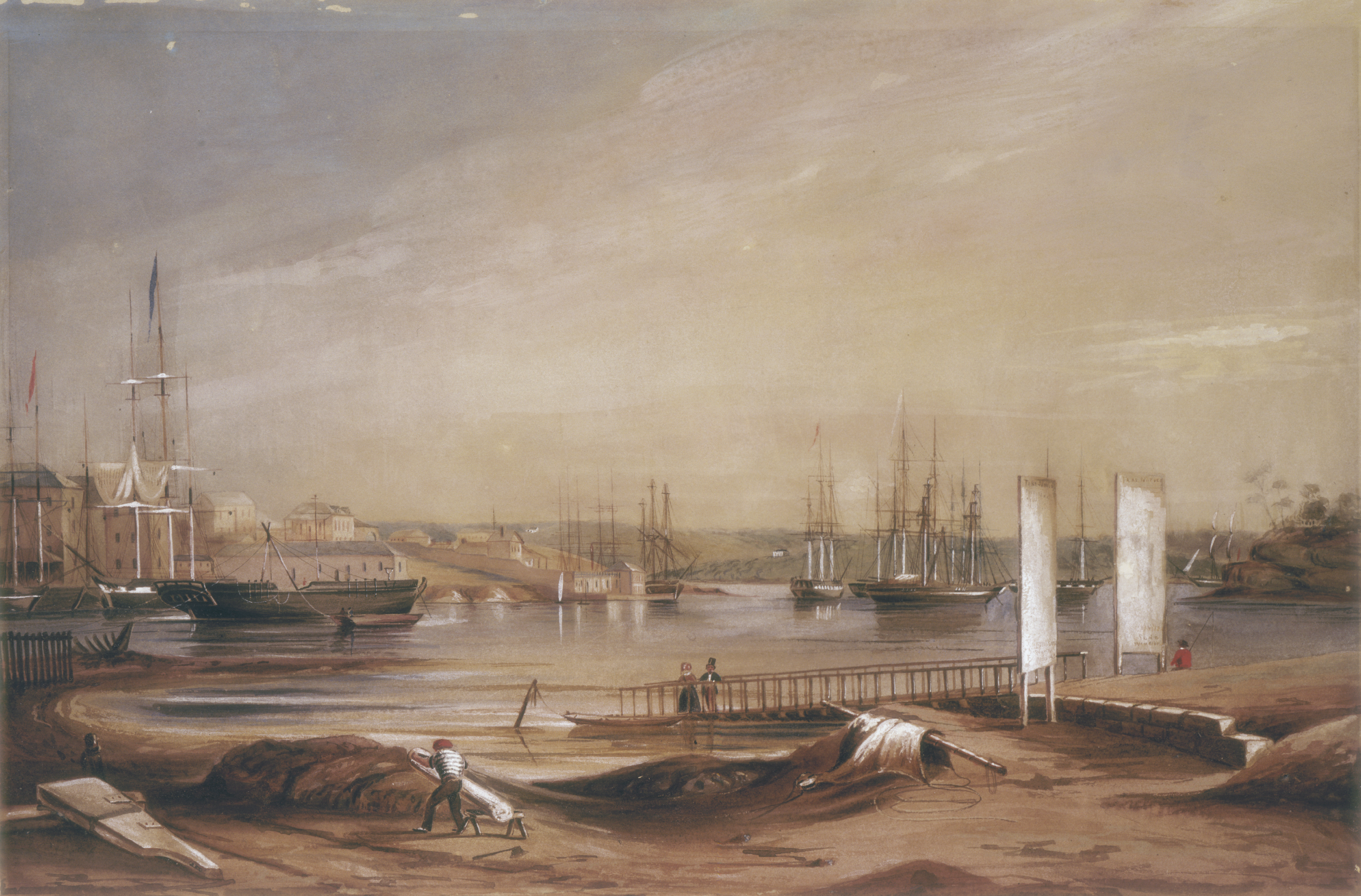
Circular Quay and mouth of the Tank Stream, Sydney Cove, Frederick Garling Jr., 1839

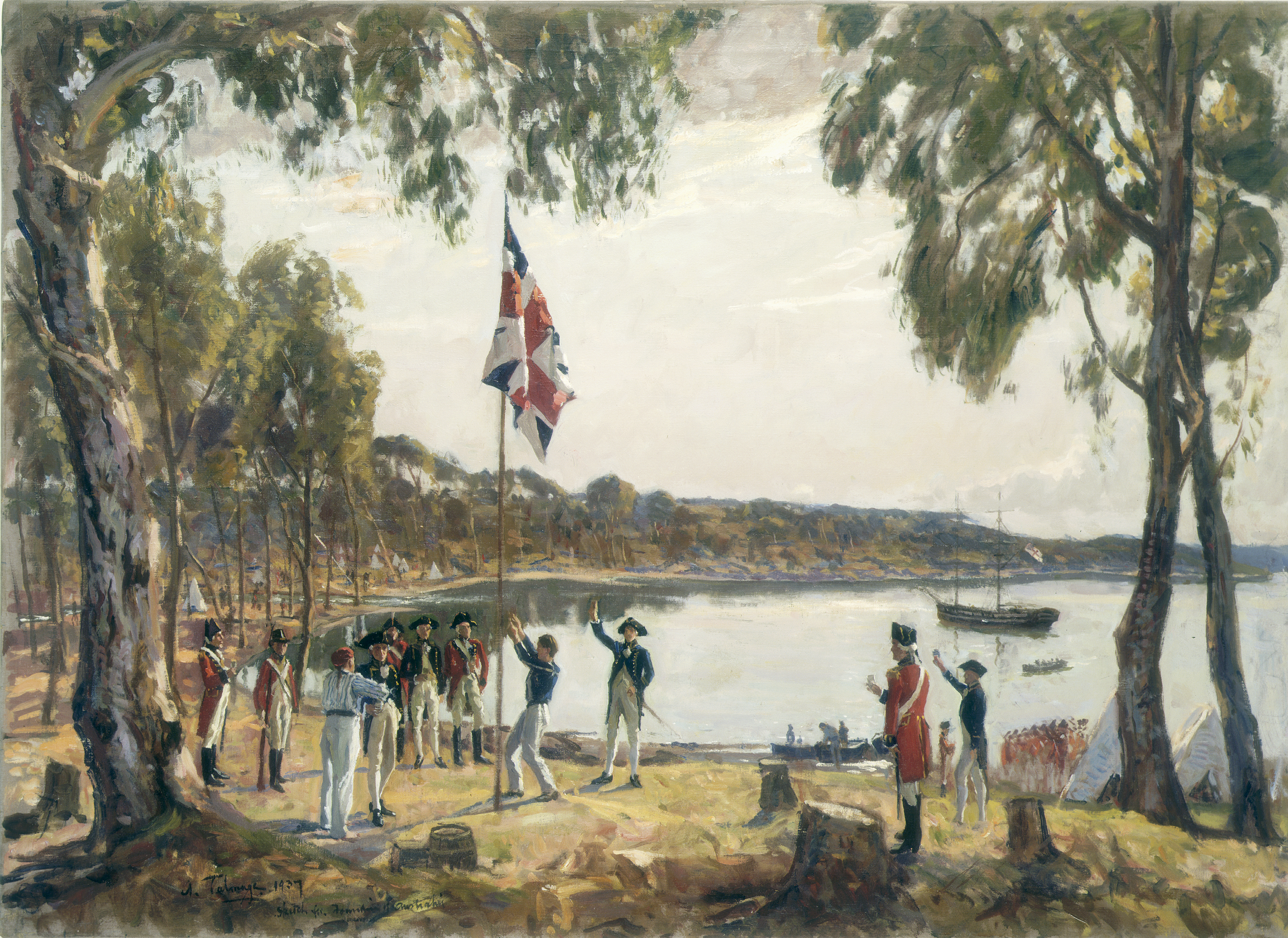
The Founding of Australia by Captain Arthur Phillip RN Sydney Cove January 26th 1788, a 1939 oil painting by Algernon Talmage

The Eora name for Sydney Cove was recorded by several early settlers of the First Fleet variously spelt as Warrane, War-ran, Warrang and Wee-rong. The spot is of great significance, as the first meeting place between Eora people and Europeans. Before colonisation of the area, Eora men speared fish from the shoreline, and women line-fished from their nowies (canoes).

Sydney Cove was named after the British Home Secretary, the 1st Baron Sydney (who was later created 1st Viscount Sydney in 1789). It was the site chosen by Captain Arthur Phillip, RN between 21 and 23 January 1788 for the British penal settlement which is now the city of Sydney, and where possession of New South Wales was formally declared on 26 January (now commemorated as Australia Day). Today, the exact site where the flag was planted is unmarked, being a spot near the bottom of Bethel Steps, The Rocks (behind the south end of the present Overseas Passenger Terminal) This site on the west side of the Cove is confirmed by a 1789 letter by John Campbell.

Phillip had been instructed to establish the settlement at Botany Bay, a large bay further south of Sydney Cove which had been discovered by Lieutenant James Cook during his voyage of discovery in 1770, and was recommended by the eminent botanist Sir Joseph Banks, who had accompanied Cook, as a suitable site for a settlement. But Phillip discovered that Botany Bay offered neither a secure anchorage nor a reliable source of fresh water. Sydney Cove offered both of these, being serviced by a freshwater creek which was soon to be known as the Tank Stream.

It must have been like entering paradise on that summer afternoon when the sea-won convoy passed through the dun and barren headlands into the untouched harbour – the water brilliantly blue, the shores high and wooded without being precipitous, a scattering of islands, sandy beaches, the trees shimmering under the sun.
The site of the settlement was Sydney Cove. It was one of the smaller inlets, chosen because it had fresh water and good anchorage for ships close into the land. The Governor's working party had cleared a camping ground beside the creek, which stole silently along through a very thick wood, the stillness of which had then for the first time since the Creation, been interrupted by the rude sound of the labourer's axe.

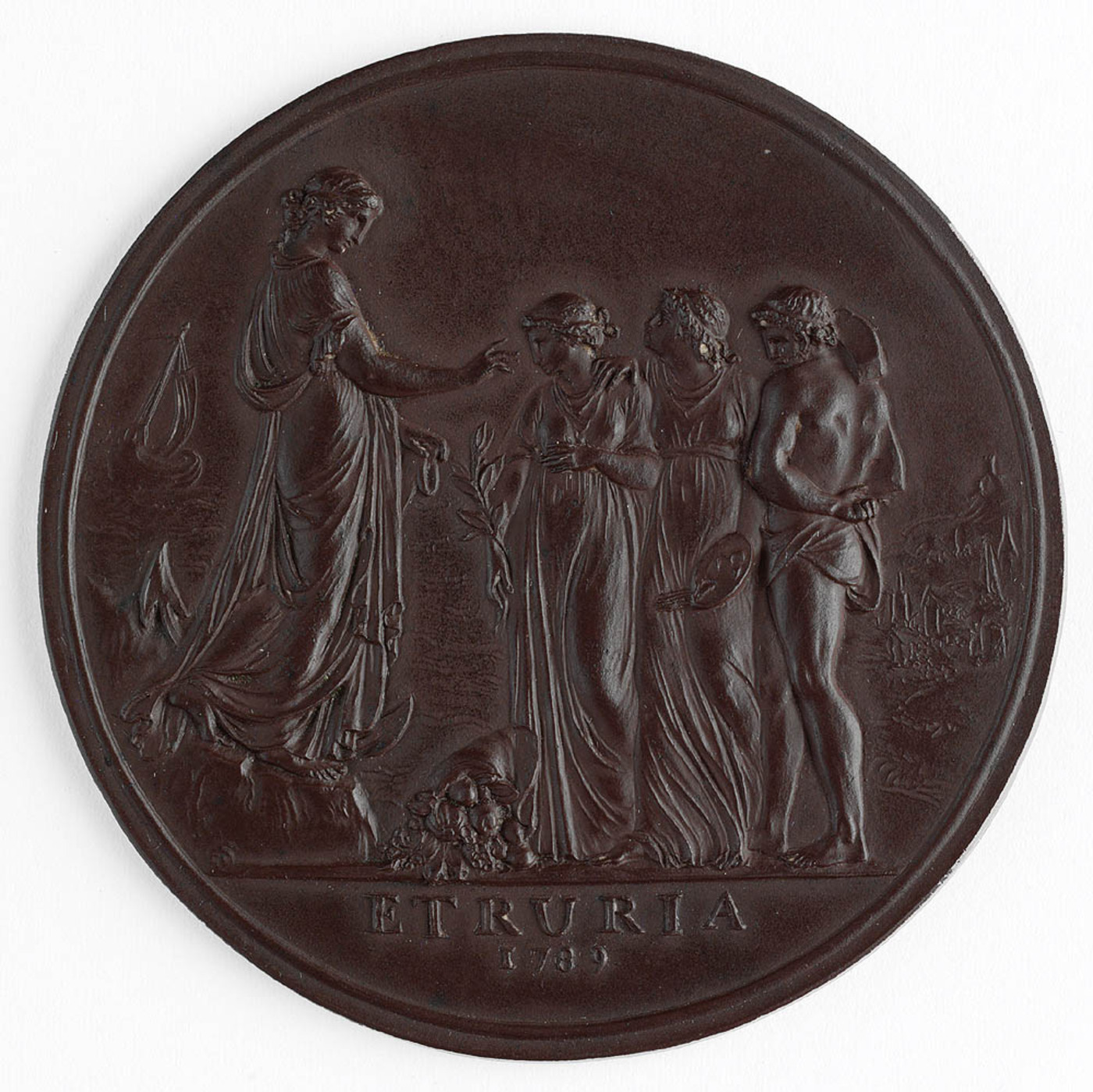
Sydney Cove medallion

=== Sydney Cove Medallion ===
A sample of the dark grey clay of Sydney Cove was collected by Governor Phillip and given to Sir Joseph Banks, who gave it to pottery maker Josiah Wedgwood to test for suitability for making pottery. Wedgwood found it excellent and made a commemorative medal that became known as the Sydney Cove Medallion.

== Today ==
The cove is dual-named as Warrane, the name by which it was known by the Eora people.

The Tank Stream is encased in a concrete drain beneath the streets of the central business district and all native bushland has been cleared. The head of the cove is occupied by the Circular Quay ferry terminal. On Bennelong Point at the northern end of the eastern shore of the cove stands the Sydney Opera House. On the western shore is the historic district known as The Rocks.

Sydney Cove is a focal point for community celebrations, due to its central Sydney location between the Sydney Opera House and the Sydney Harbour Bridge. It is also one of the main congregation points for Sydney New Year's Eve and Australia Day events.

== See also ==
- Culture of Sydney
- Sydney punchbowls
