= Punch bowl =

Large bowl used for punch

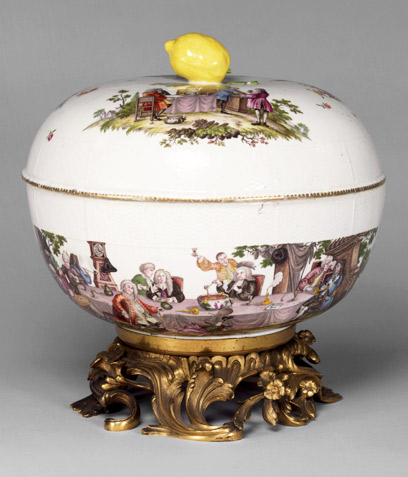
Punch bowl with lid and stand, made at the Meissen porcelain factory, Germany, 1770, V&A Museum no. C.37&A-1960

A punch bowl or punchbowl is a bowl, often large and wide, for serving mixed drinks such as hippocras, punch or mulled wine, with a ladle.

Very large examples, like the Jerningham wine cooler, are usually called a wine cistern. These were more often used as wine coolers, for cooling wine bottles with icy water, but for a large party might be used as punchbowls. Tureens normally used for soup or other food might also be used.

== History ==
Hippocras, wine with herbs and spices, and mulled wine, similar but more likely to be served hot, go back to the Middle Ages, indeed ancient times. In Ancient Greek pottery, the krater is a large (sometimes extremely large, as in the Vix Krater) mixing-bowl for wine, of similar rounded shape, but with two horizontal handles.

The word punch is a loanword from Hindi. The original drink was named paantsch, which is Hindi for "five", and the drink was made from five different ingredients: spirit, sugar, lemon, water or tea and spices. The drink was brought back from India to England by the sailors and employees of the British East India Company in the early seventeenth century, and from there it was introduced into other European countries.

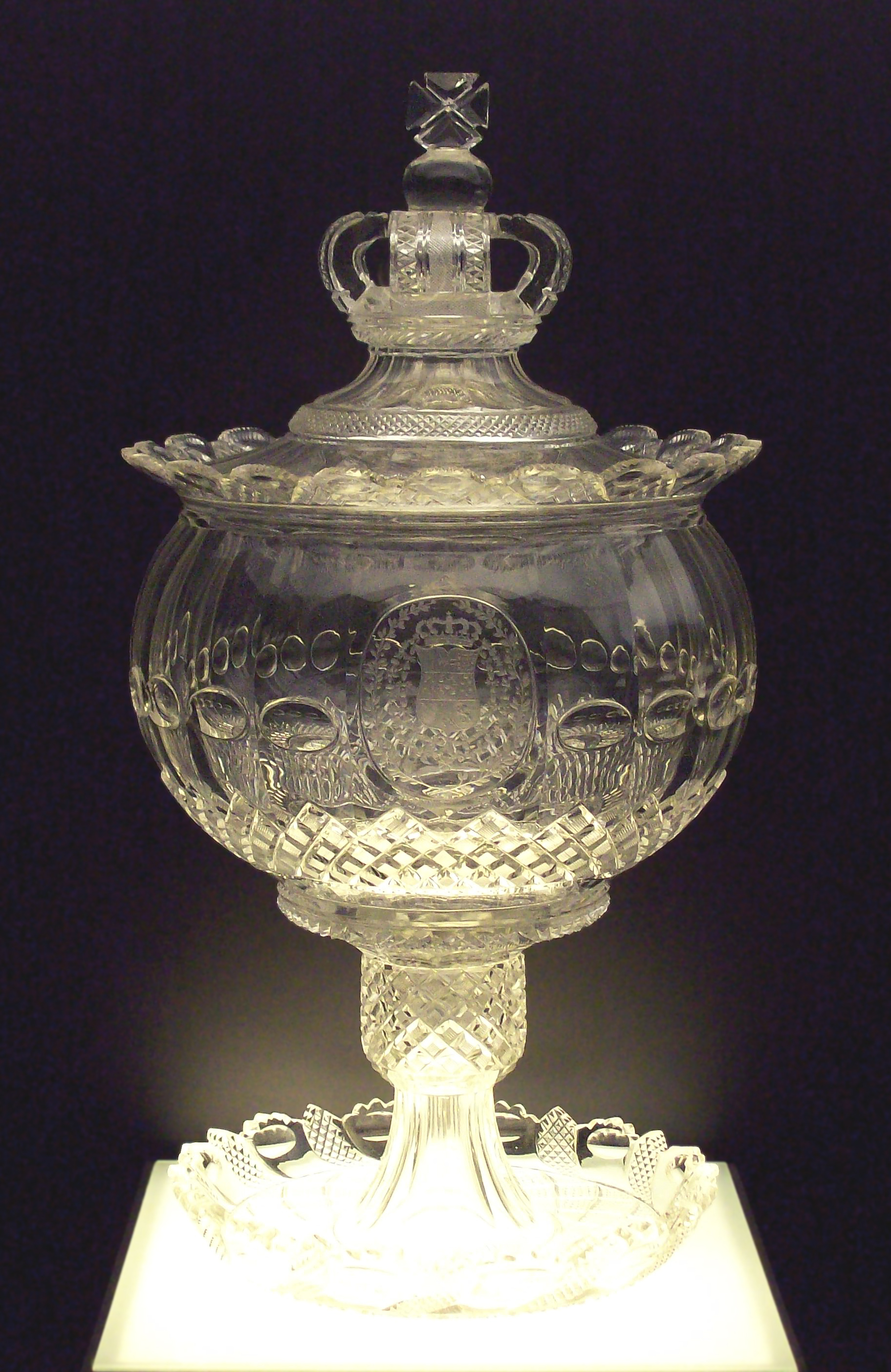
Spanish royal punch bowl made by Baccarat manufactory (France) towards 1830

Punch quickly became a popular drink. It was served in punch bowls, usually ceramic or silver, which were often elaborately decorated. Punch bowls sometimes had lids or were supported on a stand; other accessories such as a serving ladle and cups in which to serve the drink sometimes accompanied the punch bowl. Punch bowls were often painted with inscriptions or were used for testimonial purposes: the first successful whaling voyage from Liverpool was commemorated by a punch bowl presented by the owners of the ship to its captain.

The ubiquity of the punch bowl as a household item is illustrated in this 1832 quote:

The punch-bowl was an indispensable vessel in every house above the humblest class. And there were many kindly recollections connected with it, it being very frequently given as a present. No young married couple ever thought of buying a punch-bowl; it was always presented to them by a near-relative.

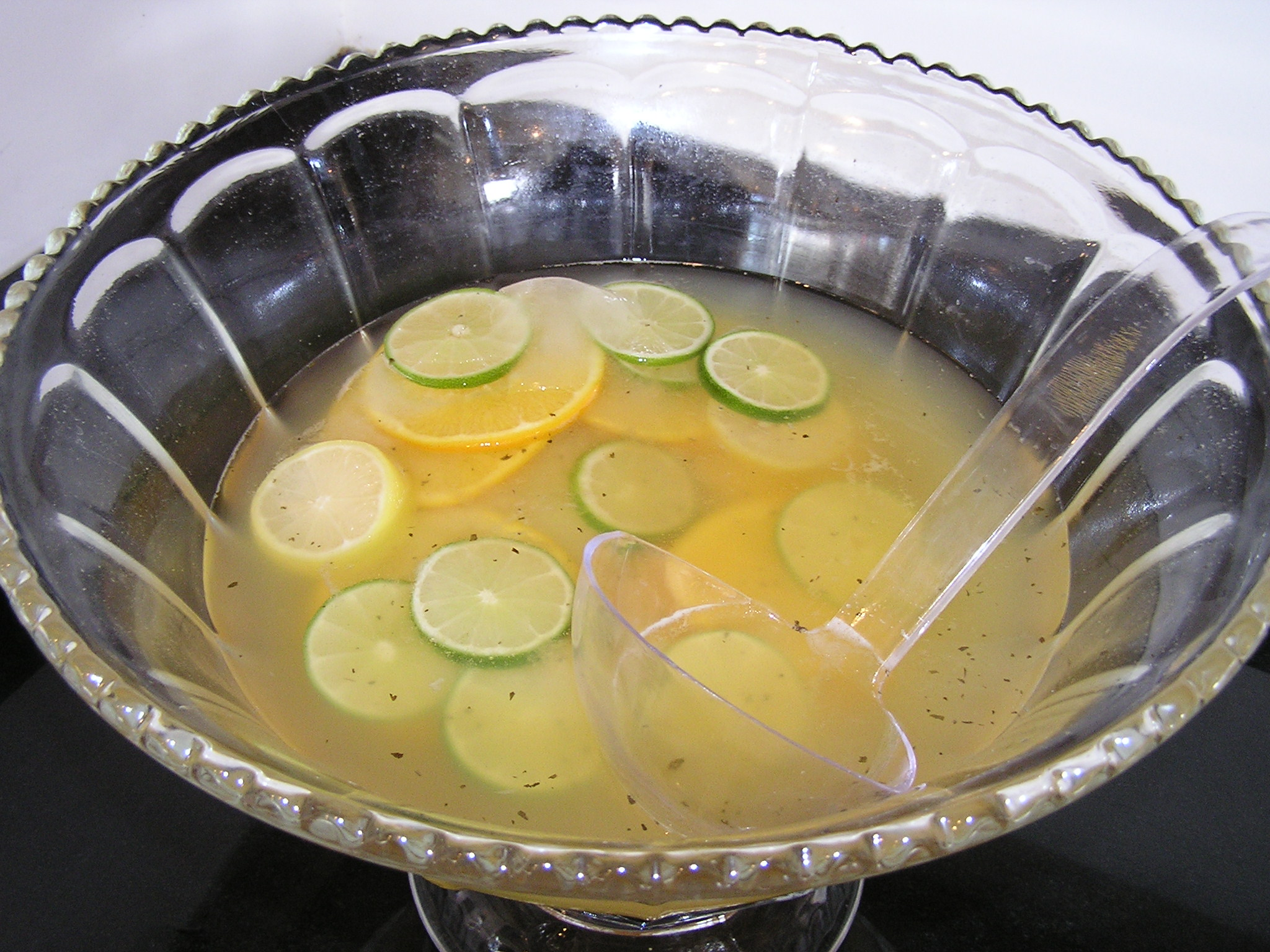
A glass punch bowl with serving ladle.

Occasionally, less likely vessels were used as punch bowls, such as a marble fountain to serve 6,000:

On the 15th October 1694 Admiral Edward Russell, then commanding the Mediterranean fleet, gave a grand entertainment at Alicante. The tables were laid under the shade of orange-trees, in four garden-walks meeting in a common centre, at a marble fountain, which last, for the occasion, was converted into a Titanic punch-bowl. Four hogsheads of brandy, one pipe of Malaga wine, twenty gallons of lime-juice, twenty-five hundred lemons, thirteen hundredweight of fine white sugar, five pounds' weight of grated nutmegs, three hundred toasted biscuits, and eight hogsheads of water, formed the ingredients of this monster-brewage. An elegant canopy placed over the potent liquor, prevented waste by evaporation, or dilution by rain; while, in a boat, built expressly for the purpose, a ship-boy rowed round the fountain, to assist in filling cups for the six thousand persons who partook of it.

== Particular punch bowls ==
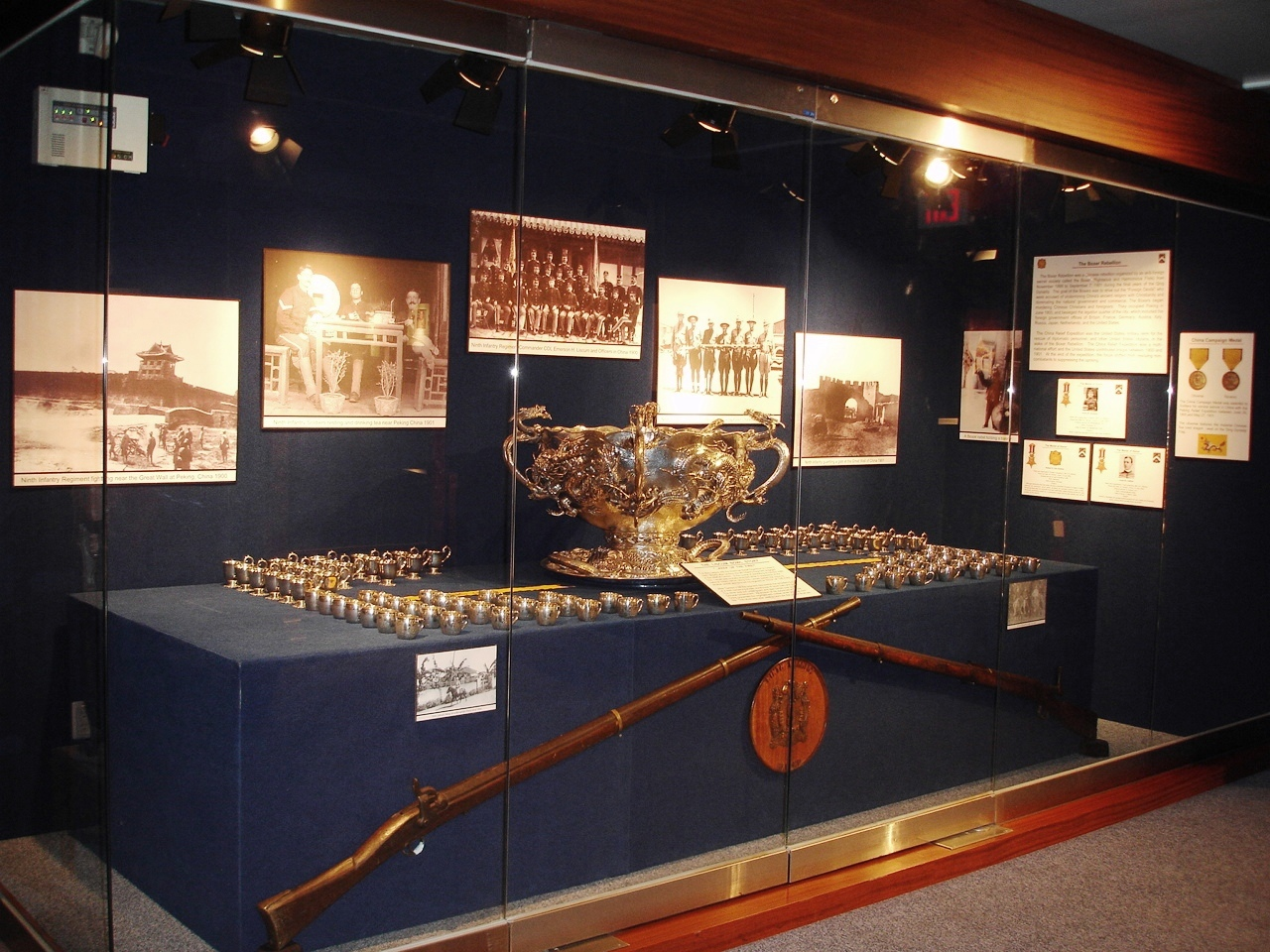
The Liscum Bowl set on display, 2nd Infantry Division Museum, Korea

- Jesus College, Oxford owns a large silver-gilt punch bowl, presented by Sir Watkin Williams-Wynn in 1732. The bowl, which weighs more than 200 ounces (5.7 kg) and holds 10 imperial gallons (45 L), was used at a dinner held in the Radcliffe Camera in 1814, to celebrate what was supposed to be the final defeat of Napoleon. Those present at the dinner included the Tsar of Russia, the King of Prussia, Blücher, Metternich, the Prince Regent, the Duke of York and the Duke of Wellington. There is a college tradition that the bowl will be presented to anyone who can meet two challenges. The first is to put arms around the bowl at its widest point; the second is to drain the bowl of strong punch. The bowl measures 5 feet 2 inches (1.57 m) at its widest point, and so the first challenge has only been accomplished rarely; the second challenge has not been met.
- The Stanley Cup is frequently described as a punch bowl.
- The Sydney punchbowls are made of Chinese porcelain and depict rare scenes of early Sydney.
- The Liscum Bowl set is made from 90 pounds (41 kg) of sterling silver gifted to the United States Army from China during the Boxer Rebellion in 1900. It is the most prized possession of the 9th Infantry Regiment and worth upwards of $2.5 million.

== Other uses ==
At times, punch bowls were used as baptismal fonts in dissenting families.

The American poet Oliver Wendell Holmes wrote the poem On Lending a Punch-bowl about an old silver punch bowl.

In English usage, large, bowl-shaped landscape features (often the head of combes or valleys) were occasionally given the name punch bowl, such as the Devil's Punch Bowl in Surrey or Punchbowl Crater ("The Punchbowl") on the island of Oahu in Hawaii.

== See also ==
- Monteith (bowl)
