= Emerson H. Liscum =

United States Army officer (1841–1900)

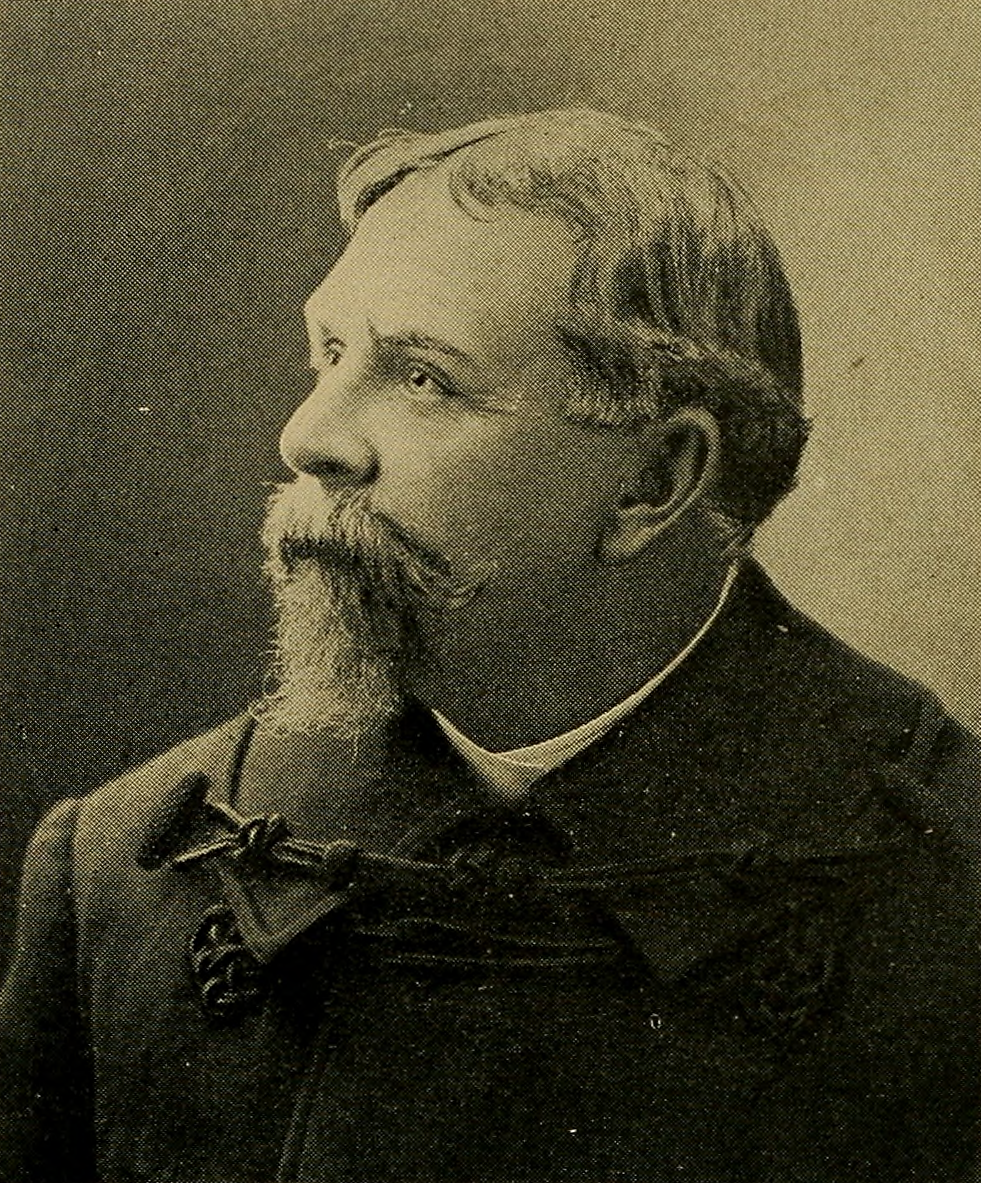
- Born: July 16, 1841; Huntington, Vermont, U.S.
- Died: July 13, 1900 (aged 58); Tianjin, China
- Burial place: Arlington National Cemetery
- Relatives: Alexander S. Diven (father-in-law)
- Military career
- Allegiance: United States
- Branch: Union Army; United States Army
- Service years: 1861–1900
- Rank: Colonel
- Commands: 24th Infantry Regiment; 9th Infantry Regiment
- Conflicts: American Civil War: Battle of Big Bethel; Battle of Cedar Mountain (WIA); Battle of Chancellorsville; Battle of Gettysburg (WIA); Battle of Bethesda Church; Indian Wars; Spanish–American War: Battle of San Juan Hill (WIA); Philippine–American War; Boxer Rebellion: Battle of Tientsin †

Colonel Emerson Hamilton Liscum (July 16, 1841 – July 13, 1900) was a U.S. Army officer who fought in the American Civil War, Indian Wars, Spanish–American War, and the Philippine–American War. He was killed in battle at Tianjin, China during the Boxer Rebellion while commanding the 9th Infantry Regiment.

== Military career ==
=== Civil War ===
Liscum joined the 1st Vermont Infantry in May 1861 to serve in the Union Army during the American Civil War and by June was on the front lines participating in the Battle of Big Bethel. In February 1863, he was made a lieutenant and was severely wounded at the Battle of Gettysburg in July of that year. On August 1, 1864, Liscum was promoted to captain due at least in part to his gallantry at the Battle of Bethesda Church.

Following the Civil War, Liscum was stationed in the American frontier and in the South during Reconstruction.

=== Spanish–American War ===
In July 1898, Liscum, then a lieutenant colonel, commanded the 24th Infantry Regiment at the Battle of San Juan Hill. On the first day of the battle, he briefly commanded the 24th as well as the 9th and 13th Infantry Regiments following the wounding in quick succession of Colonel Charles A. Wikoff and Lieutenant Colonel William Worth. However, Liscum was severely wounded less than ten minutes after Colonel Wikoff and forced to relinquish his command.

=== Philippine–American War ===
Following nine months of recovery from his wounds, Liscum was stationed in the Philippines during the Philippine–American War; he was first placed in charge of a brigade in the Eighth Army Corps and later made commander of the 9th U.S. Infantry.

=== Boxer Rebellion ===
As the need for foreign troops in China became apparent during the Boxer Rebellion, Liscum and his 1,350 men were dispatched to the Taku Forts, arriving on July 9, 1900, only four days before the assault on Tianjin was to begin. As Liscum and Robert Leamy Meade were among the last to arrive at the Eight-Nation Alliance fort, they were unable to participate in the planning of the attack and were instead subject to the will of British Royal Engineers General Arthur Dorward.

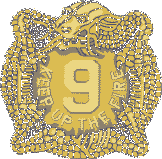
The 9th Infantry Regiment adopted Liscum's last words, "Keep up the fire," as its motto.

Early in the morning of July 13, Liscum was to lead the 9th Infantry on the left side of an allied attack on the walled city. However, due to poor planning and miscommunication, Liscum led his men to the right across open ground in plain view of Chinese snipers equipped with modern rifles. Seeing the regiment's standard-bearer fall, Liscum rushed to retrieve the flags; a bullet then hit him in the abdomen. He became one of the 150 American soldiers who were killed by Chinese sharpshooters defending the city.

After being shot but before collapsing, he is alleged to have shouted "Keep up the fire, men."

== Legacy and personal life ==
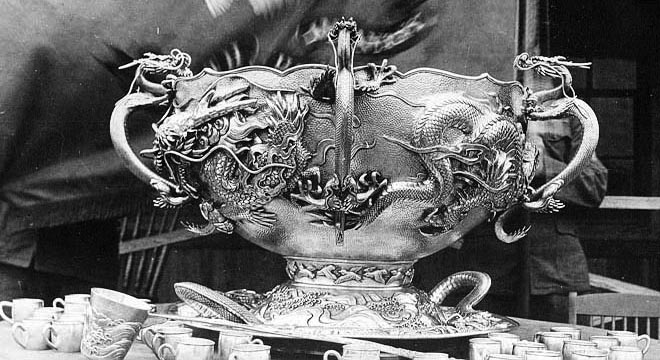
Liscum Bowl circa 1907

Liscum married May Diven, the daughter of Alexander S. Diven, a former United States Representative from New York's 27th congressional district, on September 4, 1867. Liscum was a member of the Military Order of the Loyal Legion of the United States and the Grand Army of the Republic. He is buried at Arlington National Cemetery with his wife Mary Diven (1846–1933).

His last words, "Keep up the fire, men," or "Keep up the fire," have become the motto of the 9th Infantry Regiment. The Regiment's nickname, "Manchus," was also inspired by its time in China.

Possibly the most important piece of 20th century silver metalwork, the Liscum Bowl, was created in 1902 in honor of Liscum and his regiment. A road in Fort Sam Houston is named after Liscum. A portrait of Liscum was dedicated at the Vermont State House in 1902 by Governor William W. Stickney.

Fort Liscum in Valdez, in the Territory of Alaska, was named in his honor.

== See also ==
- Liscum Bowl, made in honor of Liscum
- Grave of Emerson H. Liscum, Arlington National Cemetery, Virginia, U.S.
