= James Edge Partington =

British anthropologist

James Edge Partington (or Edge-Partington, 1854–1930) was a British anthropologist, acknowledged as an authority on Pacific ethnology. He collected materials of the peoples of the Pacific and Australasian regions, but also took an interest in the peasant culture of Europe, especially in the area of the Chiltern Hills.

== Life and legacy ==
Born 6 February 1854, his family moved from Manchester to London, though he maintained close connections with the North of the country. His education was at Rugby School, and after reading law he began a career as a solicitor. He made an extended expedition to the Pacific, starting in 1879.

Partington was a long serving member of the Royal Anthropological Institute, frequently attending its meetings and publishing in its journal, and volunteered his time to the ethnological department of the British Museum.

He built up a substantial library of books during his lifetime. The sale catalogue for these ran to 190 pages. There were 2,682 items just relating to Australia, New Zealand and the Pacific.

Before he died on 4 November 1930, his extensive collections and some volumes from his library were donated to the British, Australian, and Auckland museums.
