= McKee Grave =

Cemetery sculpture in Arlington National Cemetery, US

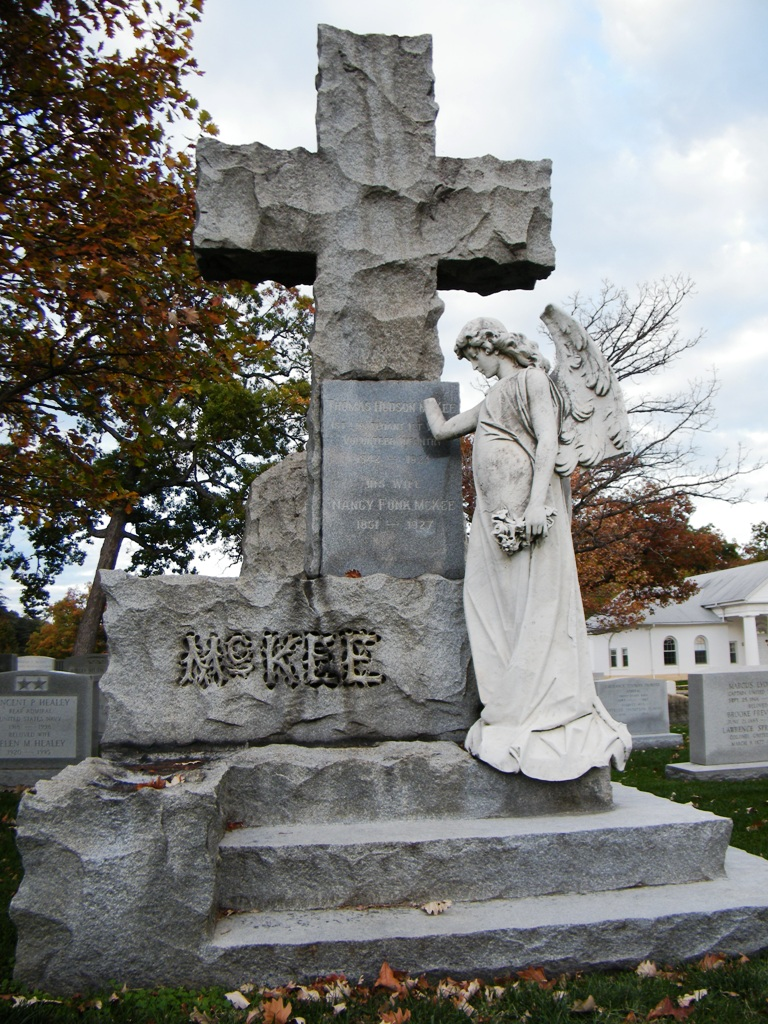
- Year: c. 1890
- Type: Marble
- Dimensions: 2.7 m × 2.1 m × 1.5 m (9 ft × 7 ft × 5 ft)
- Location: Arlington, Virginia, United States; 38°52′49.93″N 77°4′29.08″W
- Owner: Arlington National Cemetery

McKee Grave is a public artwork by an unknown artist, located at Arlington National Cemetery, Arlington, Virginia, United States. It serves as the final resting place of First Lieutenant Thomas Hudson McKee and his wife.

== Description ==
This grave marker is made of marble and has a figure of a robed angel as its centerpiece. The angel is mounted on a two-stepped base that has a large cross on the rear section of the base, behind the angel. The angel holds a bouquet of flowers in her proper left hand at waist length and her proper right arm is raised and bent upwards. She is missing her hand. The cross has a plaque that the angel stands next to. The grave is inscribed: MCKEE.

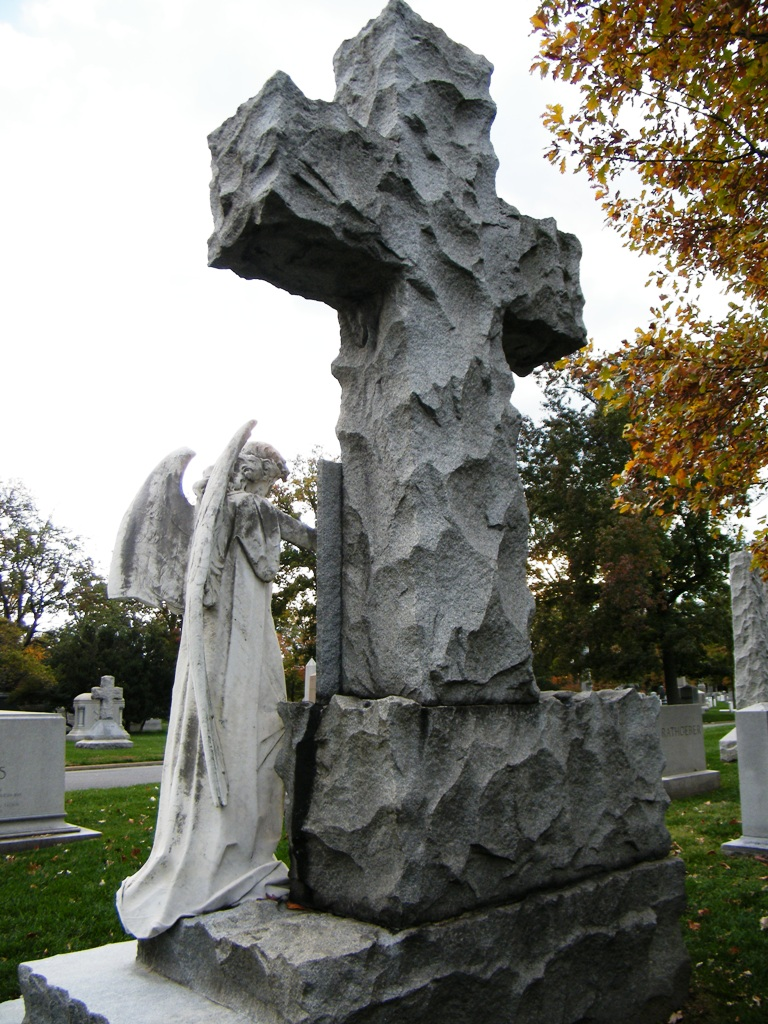
Back

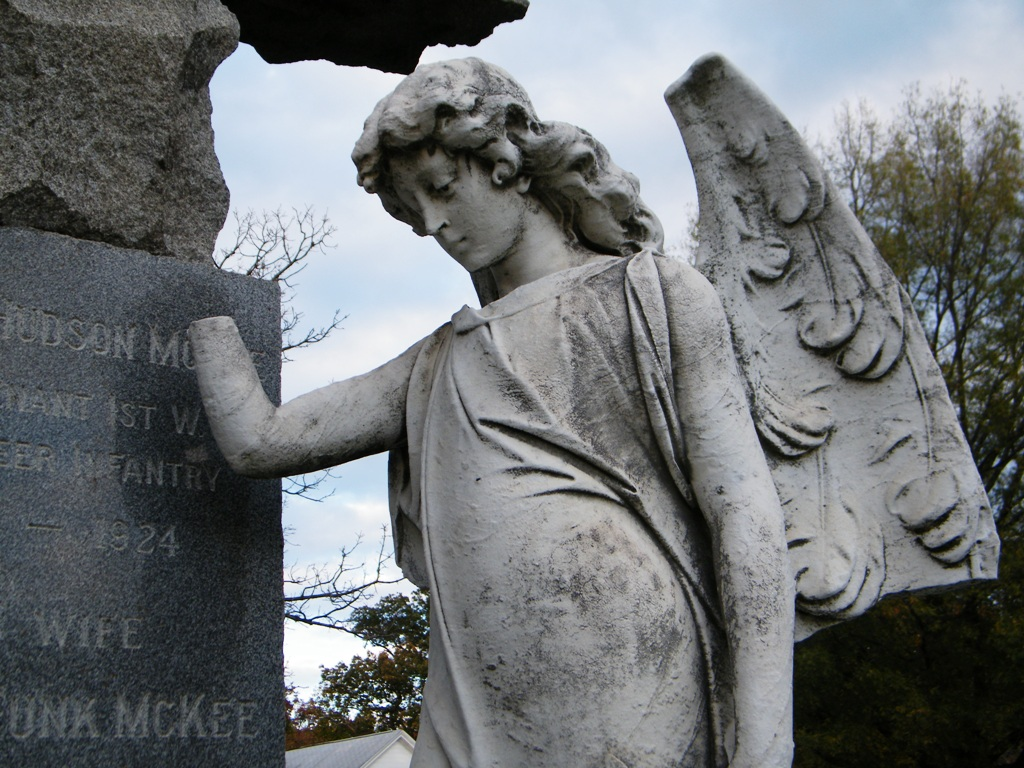
Detail

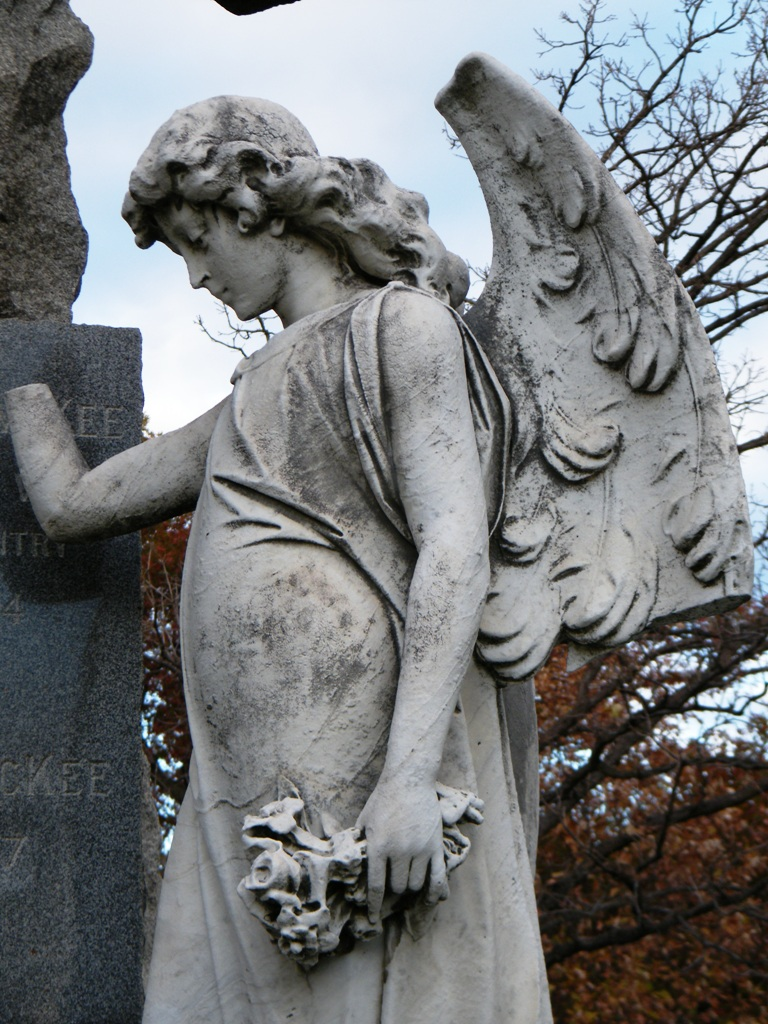
Detail

== Information ==
Thomas Hudson McKee served in the 1st West Virginia Volunteer Infantry Regiment (3 Year) in the American Civil War. He was an aide to Brigadier General Benjamin Franklin Kelley who is buried behind McKee. Born in Washington County, Pennsylvania and working as a farmer, he enlisted in the Army September 12, 1861 in Independence, Pennsylvania. He was promoted to Second Lieutenant on November 1, 1862. On September 11, 1863, he was captured by Confederate soldiers at Moorefield, West Virginia.

His wife, Nancy Matilda Funk was born in Washington County on January 14, 1851, and died in 1927. The couple married on October 14, 1868, in Mifflintown, Pennsylvania.

Next to the McKee grave is the gravesite of the McKees' daughter, Molly. She was not eligible to be buried at Arlington; however, Thomas McKee called on his friendship with President Theodore Roosevelt for special permission to bury Molly at the family plot.

== Acquisition ==
This grave is located in Section 1 and is placed in front of the Kelley grave. Rumors of the time state that when McKee died in 1924, his wife, Nancy Matilda Funk McKee, had the large memorial built to intentionally block the view of General Kelley's grave.

== Condition ==
This sculpture was surveyed in 1995 as part of the Save Outdoor Sculpture! program and was described as needing treatment urgently. The proper right hand of the angel is missing.
