= Donald Trump Arlington National Cemetery incident =

2024 American political controversy

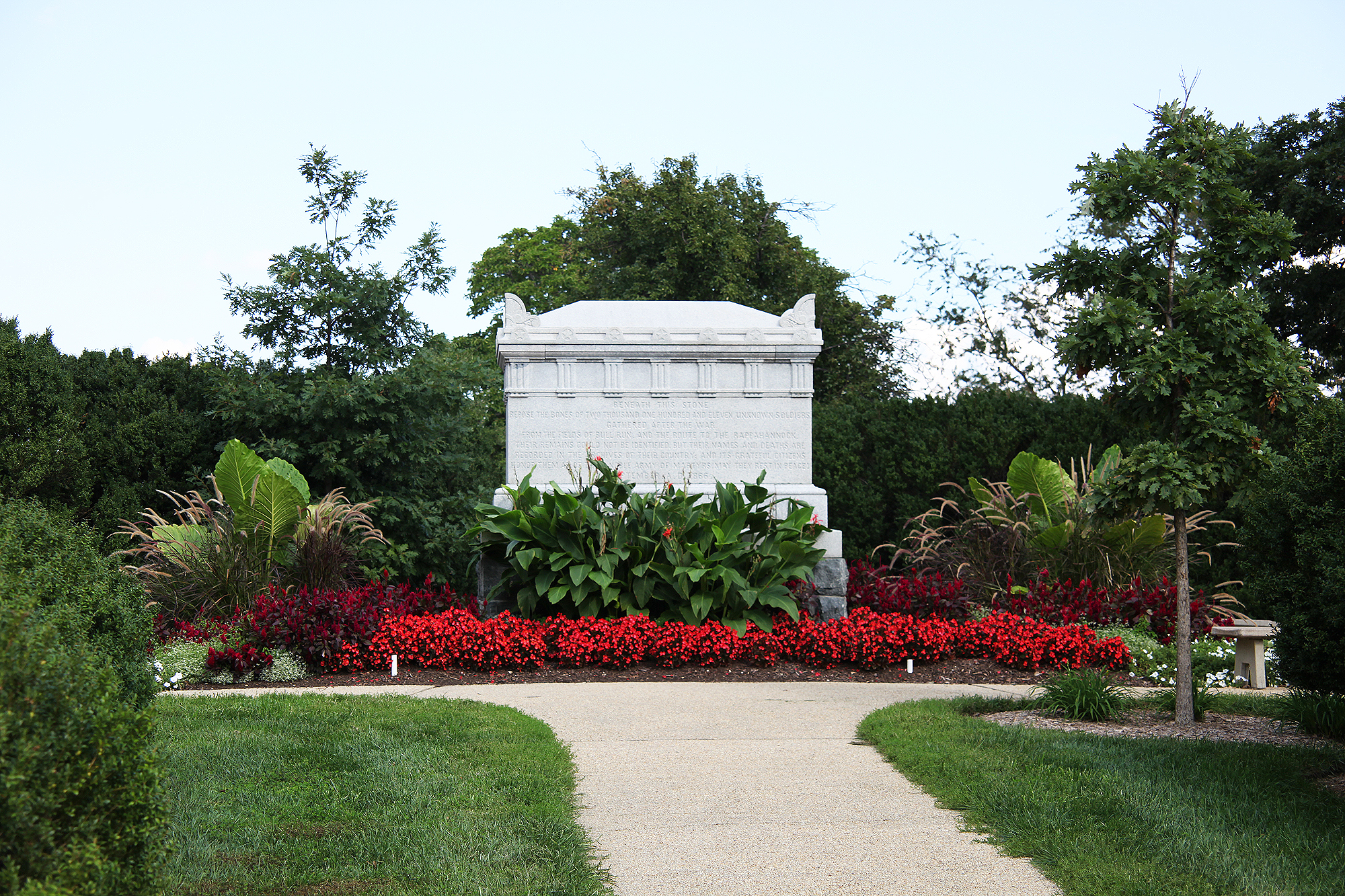
Arlington National Cemetery in 2011

In August 2024, then-Republican presidential candidate Donald Trump visited Arlington National Cemetery, Virginia, to honor the 13 U.S. service members killed in the 2021 Kabul airport attack. During the visit, a dispute occurred when Trump’s team brought in a photographer and videographer for campaign-related content at the gravesite in Section 60, an area reserved for recently deceased soldiers. When a cemetery official attempted to stop them, two Trump staffers allegedly pushed and verbally abused the official. The Trump campaign denied any wrongdoing, asserting that the individual was unstable and initiated the conflict. Arlington National Cemetery confirmed the incident and cited federal laws prohibiting political activity on its grounds.

The campaign later posted a video of the visit on social media, sparking criticism for using a solemn occasion for political content. Some families involved supported the filming, while others objected, claiming they had not given permission. Trump and allies, including running mate JD Vance, dismissed the backlash, accusing Democrats and the media of politicizing the event. Vance’s aggressive defense included telling Vice President and Democratic presidential candidate Kamala Harris to “go to hell,” though she had not commented on the matter. The U.S. Army condemned the incident, defending the cemetery worker, and a watchdog group later obtained related documents via court order.

== Course of events ==
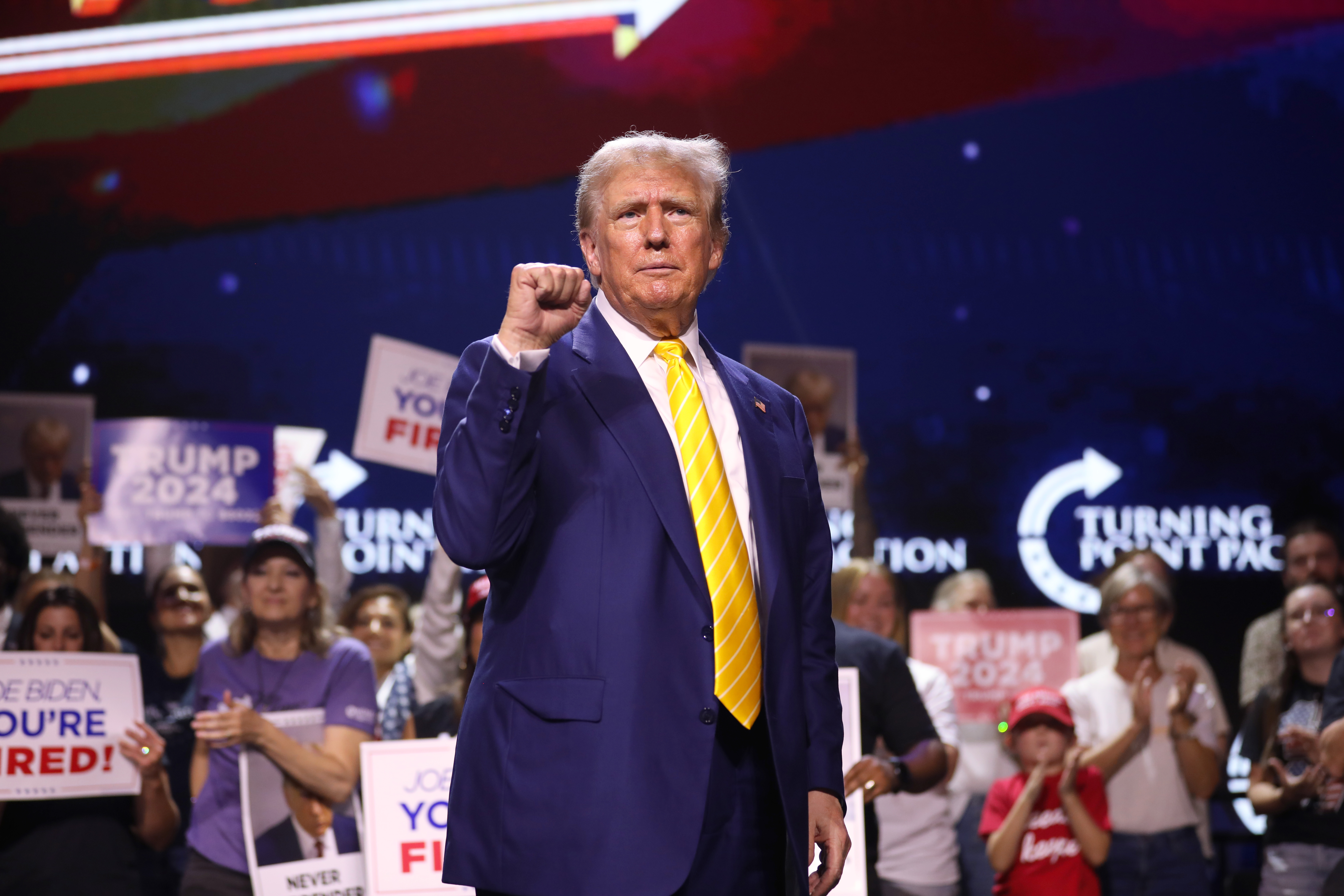
Donald Trump campaigning in 2024

On August 26, Donald Trump visited Arlington National Cemetery. NPR reported that after laying wreaths at the Tomb of the Unknown Soldier in honor of 13 Americans who were slain in the 2021 Kabul airport attack, Trump and his entourage accompanied family members of a slain soldier to his graveside in Section 60, an area where the recently deceased are buried, for filming and photographing. When a cemetery official tried to stop them from bringing in an external photographer and videographer, two staffers verbally abused and pushed the official aside. The staffers were identified by NPR as deputy campaign manager Justin Caporale and Michel Picard, a member of Trump's advance team.

Steven Cheung, the Trump campaign spokesman, stated: "We are prepared to release footage if such defamatory claims are made. The fact is that a private photographer was permitted on the premises and for whatever reason an unnamed individual, clearly suffering from a mental health episode, decided to physically block members of President Trump's team during a very solemn ceremony," and that this "individual was the one who initiated physical contact and verbal harassment that was unwarranted and unnecessary".

Trump campaign manager Chris LaCivita in a later statement said: "For a despicable individual to physically prevent President Trump's team from accompanying him to this solemn event is a disgrace and does not deserve to represent the hollowed [sic] grounds of Arlington National Cemetery." LaCivita went on to publish on social media more video of Trump's Arlington visit, with LaCivita commenting: "Reposting this hoping to trigger the hacks at @SecArmy," mentioning the social media account of the United States Secretary of the Army, Christine Wormuth. In an interview given to Fox News, Lieutenant General Keith Kellogg, who was present, said he had not seen any "dust-up".

On its part, Arlington National Cemetery confirmed the incident, that a report had been filed, and stated: "Federal law prohibits political campaign or election-related activities within Army National Military Cemeteries, to include photographers, content creators or any other persons attending for purposes, or in direct support of a partisan political candidate's campaign." According to the statement, "Arlington National Cemetery reinforced and widely shared this law and its prohibitions with all participants."

On August 27, the campaign released a video on TikTok that included Trump's Section 60 visit, which garnered criticism. He was also faulted for taking photos next to graves while smiling and giving a thumbs up. The Trump campaign pointed to a statement from some of the family members who accompanied Trump, expressing their desire for the visit to be "respectfully captured". Arlington officials updated their statement: "To protect the identity of the individual involved, no further information about the incident is being released at this time." Later on that day, Trump posted a photo on Truth Social of the Gold Star families who had invited him. In the post, the families thanked the president and stated they had invited the campaign to film in Section 60.

On August 28, Trump's running mate, Sen. JD Vance accused Kamala Harris of criticizing Trump's visit to the cemetery, which she had not yet commented on. "She wants to yell at Donald Trump because he showed up," Vance said. "She can go to hell." He also said that the media were "acting like Donald Trump filmed a TV commercial at a gravesite," but he was only "providing emotional support" to the family members. The family of another veteran whose graveside was included in campaign photographs and video said that they had not given permission for it to be included. Later that day, Vance said that his comment of "go to hell" was "colloquial" and further said: "Don't do this fake outrage thing. If Kamala Harris was really outraged about what happened, then she would do her job differently." Vance further alleged that the "media and the Democrats have made a scandal out of something where there really is none", while also saying, "I don't know the details of the altercation between the photographer and somebody in Arlington".

On August 29, the U.S. Army issued a statement rebuking the Trump campaign, saying that the participants had been "made aware of federal laws, Army regulations and DoD policies" against campaign activity on ANC grounds, and that the staff member had been "abruptly pushed aside ... and her professionalism has been unfairly attacked." The Defense Department, the Green Beret Foundation, Iraq and Afghanistan Veterans of America, VoteVets.org, issued similar statements. The Army added that while the incident was reported to the police department at Joint Base Myer-Henderson Hall, the employee in question "decided not to press charges" so the Army "considers this matter closed". It was also reported that the cemetery worker feared retaliation from Trump supporters. Cheung said in a statement on August 27 that "that is ridiculous and sounds like someone who has Trump Derangement Syndrome".

The same day, Trump said in an interview with NBC News: "I don't know what the rules and regulations are. I don't know who did it. And it could have been them. It could have been the parents. It could have been somebody else." He said that he did not know "anything about it", adding, "[i]f this was a set up by the people in the administration that, oh, Trump is coming to Arlington, that looks so bad for us."

On August 30, at the Moms for Liberty 2024 Convention, in Washington, Trump characterized the situation as "disgusting", and declared that he did not need that publicity. At a rally in Johnstown, Pennsylvania, he blamed the Biden administration for the deaths of the soldiers.

American Oversight, a government watchdog group, filed a Freedom of Information Act request with the Army for documents related to the incident, including incident reports. The group subsequently filed suit to expedite the request, and on October 22, Judge Paul Friedman ruled in their favor, giving the government three days to comply.

== See also ==
- Donald Trump 2024 presidential campaign
