= Arlington National Cemetery =

Military cemetery in Virginia, US

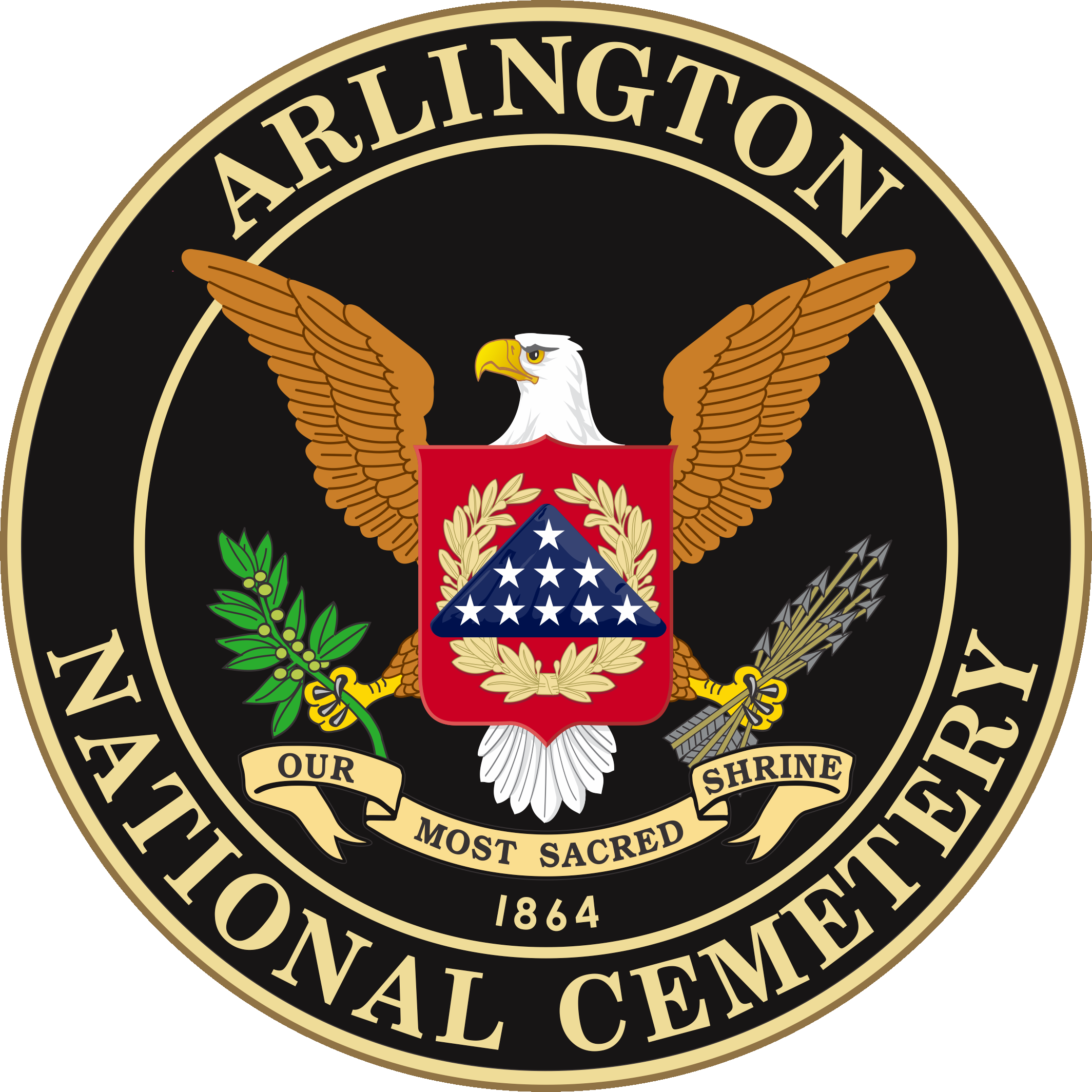
- Seal of Arlington National Cemetery
- Interactive map of Arlington National Cemetery

Details
- Established: 13 May 1864; 162 years ago
- Location: Arlington County, Virginia, U.S.
- Country: United States
- Coordinates: 38°52′45″N 77°04′20″W
- Type: National
- Owned by: U.S. Department of the Army
- Size: 639 acres (259 ha)
- No. of graves: ~400,000
- Website: arlingtoncemetery.mil

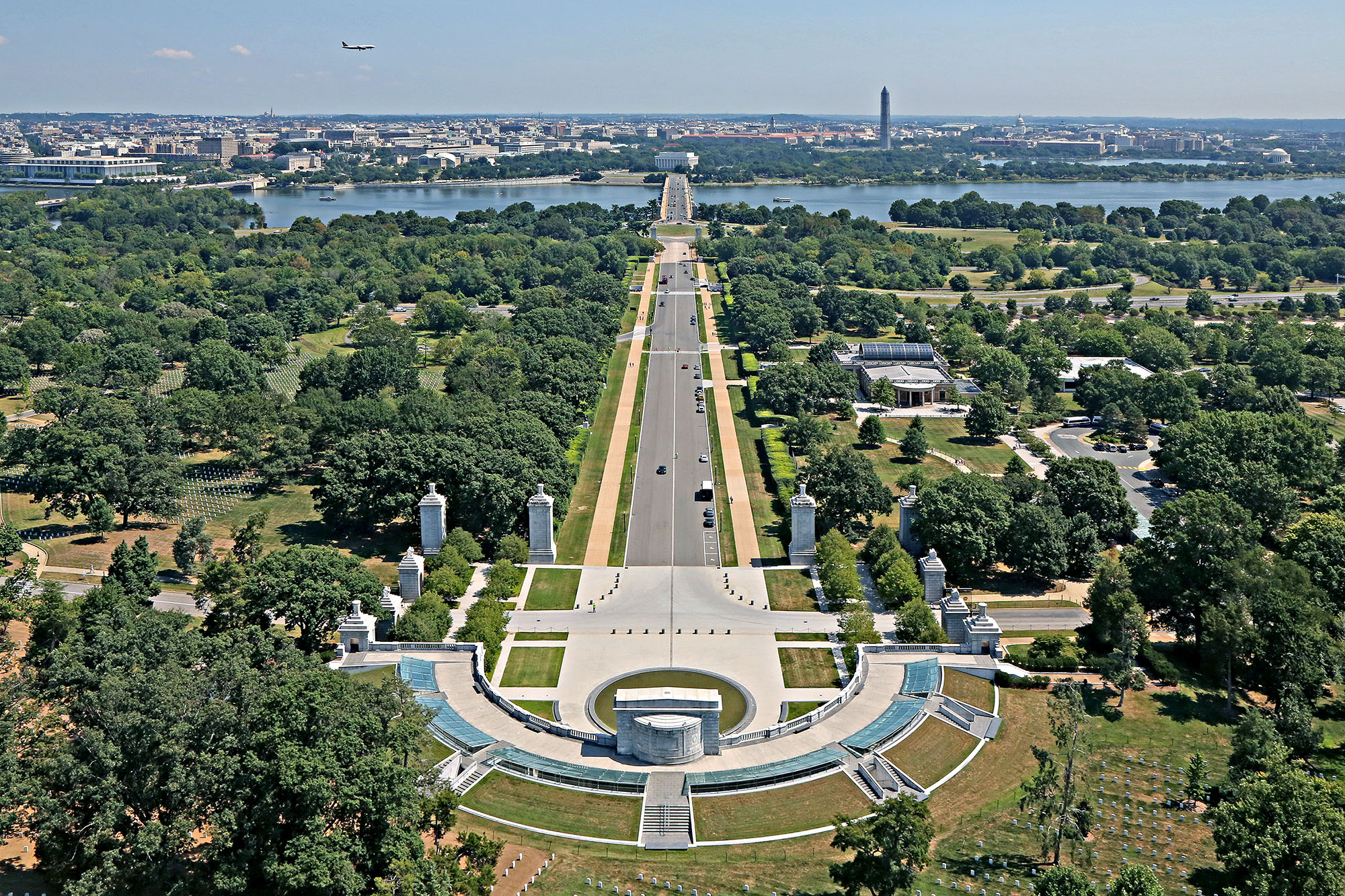
An aerial view of Arlington National Cemetery's east entrance and the cemetery's Women's Military Memorial in August 2013

Arlington National Cemetery is the largest cemetery in the United States National Cemetery System, one of two maintained by the United States Army. More than 400,000 people are buried in its 639 acres (259 ha) in Arlington County, Virginia.

Arlington National Cemetery was established on 13 May 1864, during the American Civil War. It was named after Arlington Estate, the land on which the cemetery was built. This land had been confiscated by the U.S. federal government from the private ownership of Confederate States Army general Robert E. Lee's family following a tax dispute over the property. The cemetery is managed by the U.S. Department of the Army. As of 2024, it conducts approximately 27 to 30 funerals each weekday and between six and eight services on Saturday, or 141 to 158 per week.

In April 2014, Arlington National Cemetery Historic District, including Arlington National Cemetery, Arlington House, Memorial Drive, the Military Women's Memorial, and Arlington Memorial Bridge, was listed on the National Register of Historic Places.

== History ==
=== 19th century ===
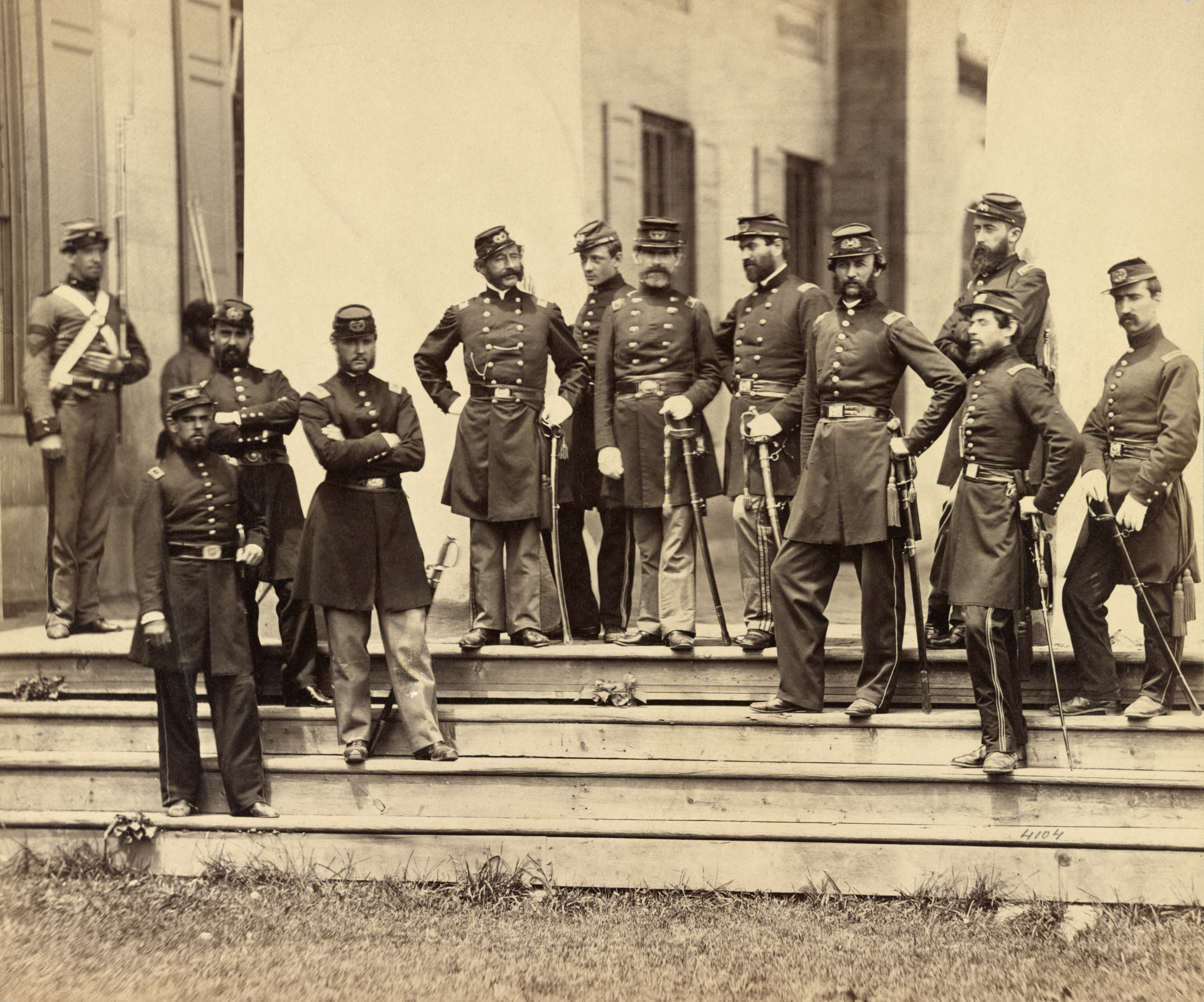
Officers of the 8th New York Infantry Regiment at Arlington House in June 1861, two months after the beginning of the American Civil War

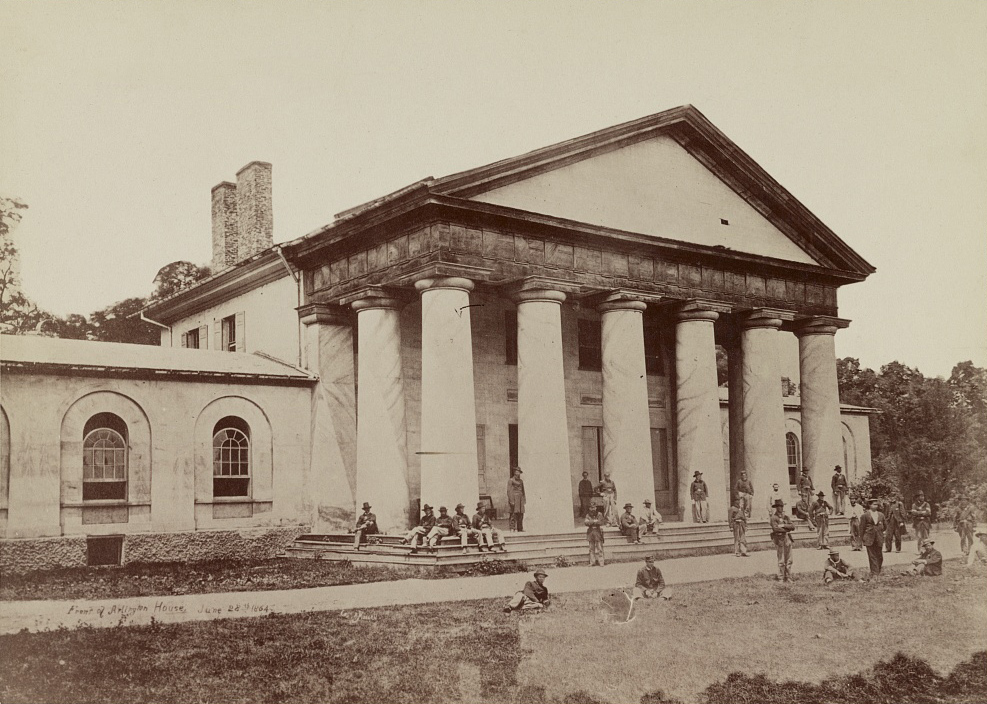
The Custis-Lee Mansion, originally known as Arlington House, with Union Army soldiers on its lawn during the American Civil War on June 28, 1864

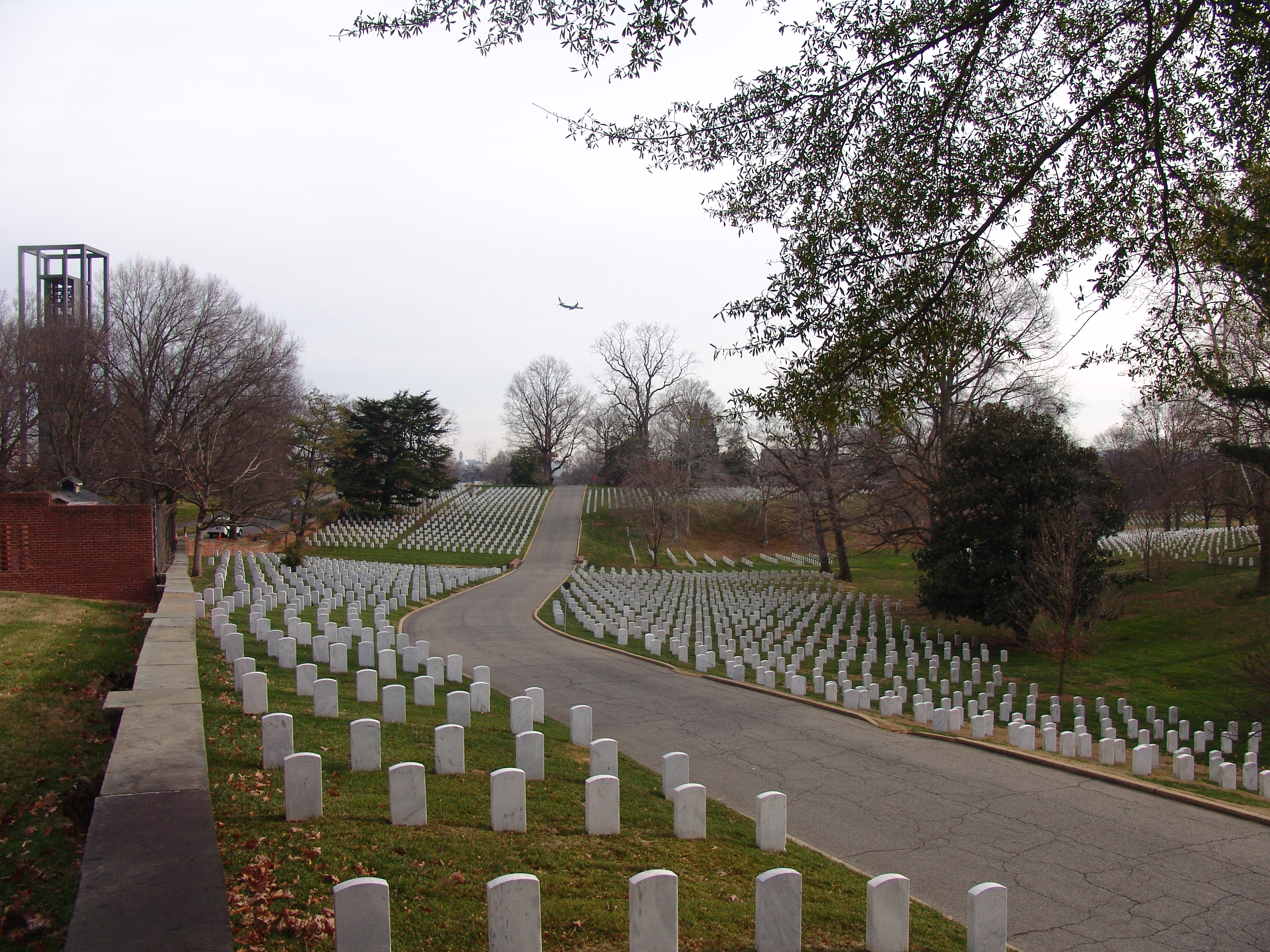
Arlington National Cemetery and the Netherlands Carillon in December 2012

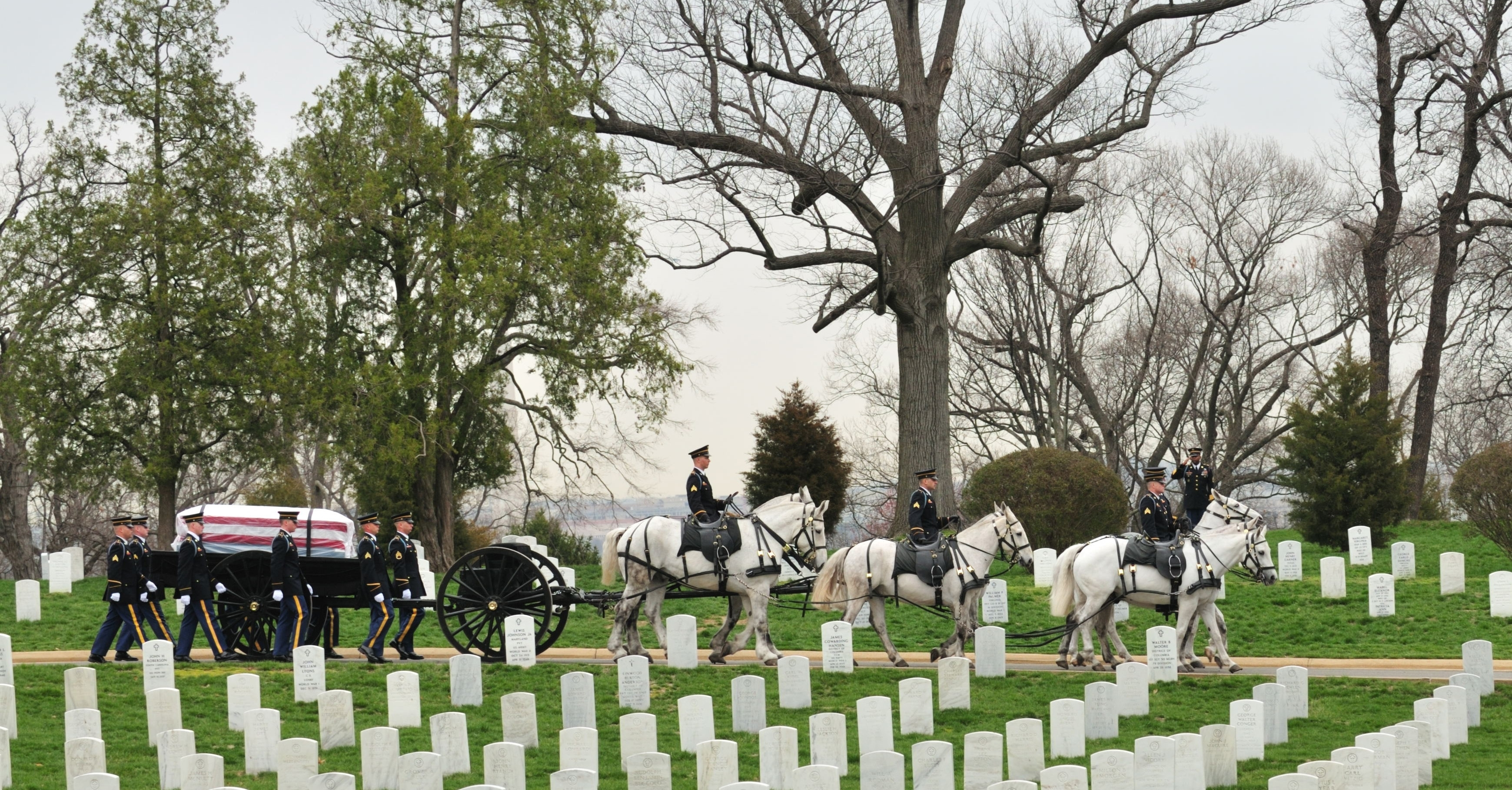
The Old Guard transports the flag-draped casket of the second Sergeant Major of the Army, George W. Dunaway, who was buried with full military honors at Arlington National Cemetery

George Washington Parke Custis was the grandson of George Washington's wife Martha through her first marriage. His father, John Parke Custis, died when he was seven months old, and he was raised by George and Martha at Mount Vernon as their own son. In 1802, at the age of 21, Custis took possession of his inheritance from his father, Arlington Plantation in Alexandria County (now Arlington County).

There he built Arlington House on high ground overlooking the Potomac River. Custis initially intended the house to serve as a home and memorial to George Washington, his foster father, but Washington died on 14 December 1799, before construction began. In 1818, Arlington House was completed.

In 1804, Custis married Mary Lee Fitzhugh. Their only surviving child was Mary Anna Randolph Custis. On 30 June 1831, she married U.S. Army 2nd Lieutenant Robert E. Lee (future Confederate States Army general).

Custis' will granted a life inheritance of the house to his wife, allowing her to live at and run Arlington House for the rest of her life but prohibiting her from selling any portion of it. In 1826 Custis acknowledged Maria Carter Syphax as his daughter and freed her, along with her 10 children and provided them with 17 acres of the Arlington Plantation.

When his wife died in 1853, Custis left Arlington to their eldest grandson, George Washington Custis Lee. Custis himself died in 1857, naming then-Colonel Lee as executor and granting Mrs. Lee life tenancy in the estate.

==== American Civil War ====
In April 1861, the American Civil War began, and Virginia promptly declared secession. The national capital of Washington, D.C., was directly across the Potomac River from Arlington Plantation, exposed to Confederate attack.

Arlington was then effectively the property of US Army Colonel Robert E. Lee and his family. However, on 20 April, Lee, in allegiance to Virginia, resigned his US commission and took command of Virginia's state troops. (He later became a full general in the Confederate States Army, and on 1 June 1862, commander of the Confederate Army of Northern Virginia.)

On 7 May 1861, Virginia militia occupied Arlington and Arlington House. With Confederate forces occupying the high ground of Arlington, the neighboring national capital in Washington, D.C. was left vulnerable to Confederate Army attack.

Despite not wanting to leave Arlington House, Mary Lee believed the estate would soon be occupied by Union soldiers. On 14 May, she buried many of her family treasures on the grounds, and then left for her sister's estate at Ravensworth in present-day Fairfax County, Virginia. Some of the personal property she buried included family portraits that were stolen by Union soldiers. McDowell occupied Arlington without opposition on 24 May.

On 24 May, Union troops crossed the Potomac and occupied Arlington without opposition. The plantation area was used as campground by Union forces.

==== Freedman's Village ====
Beginning in 1863, the federal government used the southern portion of the land now occupied by the cemetery as a settlement for freed slaves, giving the land the name "Freedman's Village". The government constructed rental houses that 1,100 to 3,000 freed slaves eventually occupied while farming 1,100 acres (450 ha) of the estate and receiving schooling and occupational training, both during the Civil War and after its end.

The Washington Chronicle described the Freedmen's Village at Arlington in an article reprinted in The Liberator in September 1864. The writer noted the tailor's shop (then employing 87 women), the schoolhouse, the home for the aged and infirm, the hospital, and the camp on nearby Mason's Island (now Theodore Roosevelt Island) which served as a labor exchange for former slaves.

Freedmen's Village remained after the war. In 1866, The Old Bell Church, led by Rev. Robert S. Laws, was founded there. After Freedman's Village became part of a military reservation, the government asked the villagers to leave. In 1887, however, some still remained, and John A. Commerford, the Superintendent of Arlington National Cemetery, asked the Quartermaster General to close the village on the grounds that people living in it had been taking trees at night from the cemetery for use as firewood. The Quartermaster General and the Secretary of War then approved Commerford's request.

==== Military cemetery ====
During the first years of the Civil War, soldiers and sailors who died in battle near Washington were buried in the United States Soldiers' Cemetery in Washington, or Alexandria Cemetery in Alexandria, Virginia. By late 1863, however, both cemeteries were nearly full.

On 16 July 1862, the Congress authorized the federal government to purchase land for national cemeteries for the military dead, and placed the U.S. Army Quartermaster General in charge of this program.

In May 1864, the Union Army suffered heavy casualties in the Battle of the Wilderness. Quartermaster General Montgomery C. Meigs ordered a review of eligible sites for the establishment of a large and new national military cemetery. His staff reported that Arlington Estate was the most suitable property in the area. The property was located at a relatively high elevation and was typically free from floods capable of unearthing graves, and it was aesthetically pleasing. A likely additional factor in its selection was that Arlington was the residence of Confederate general Robert E. Lee, and denying Lee use of his home during and following the war was gratifying to Unionists.

On 13 May 1864, William Henry Christman was buried at Arlington Cemetery, close to what is now the northeast gate in Section 27, even though Meigs did not formally authorize establishment of burials until the following month, on 15 June 1864. Consistent with the practices of many cemeteries in the late 19th century, Arlington Cemetery maintained segregated burial practices. On 26 July 1948, however, President Harry S. Truman issued Executive Order 9981, which formally reversed this practice.

In 1864, with the Civil War still ongoing, the Union acquired Arlington Cemetery for $26,800, equivalent to $551,681 in 2025, after the property was placed for tax sale. Mrs. Lee did not appear in person for the tax sale, but sent an agent, who attempted to pay the $92.07 allegedly owed in property taxes, equivalent to $1,895 in 2025, which had been assessed on the estate. The Union government, however, turned her agent away, and refused to accept the tendered payment.

=== U.S. v. Lee ===
In 1874, George Washington Custis Lee sued the U.S. federal government, claiming ownership of the Arlington Cemetery grounds. On 9 December 1882, the U.S. Supreme Court ruled 5–4 in Lee's favor in United States v. Lee, concluding that the U.S. government seized Arlington Cemetery and its surrounding grounds without affording Lee due process.

Following the U.S. Supreme Court decision, Congress abided by the Supreme Court ruling, and returned the estate to Lee. By this time, however, Lee was less interested in obtaining the property than in receiving cash compensation for it. On 3 March 1883, Custis Lee sold it back to the U.S. government for $150,000 (equivalent to $4,397,727 in 2025) at a signing ceremony with then Secretary of War Robert Todd Lincoln. The land then became a U.S. military reservation.

=== 20th century ===
In 1900, the last remaining residents of the Freedman's village departed after the 56th United States Congress appropriated $75,000 (equivalent to $2,902,500 in 2025) to settle the U.S. government's debts to them. With limited space but large numbers of KIAs from World War II, Korean War, Vietnam War, along with natural deaths from high-ranking military officials, the need for additional burial space at Arlington Cemetery became a challenge and priority to the U.S. government.

On 30 May 1929, U.S. President Herbert Hoover conducted the first national Memorial Day ceremony in Arlington National Cemetery.

In October 1991, John C. Metzler Jr., Arlington Cemetery's superintendent, implemented a $1.4 million plan to clear a former 13-acre (5.3 ha) parking lot to create additional space that would accommodate approximately 9,000 additional grave sites.

==== Wreaths Across America ====
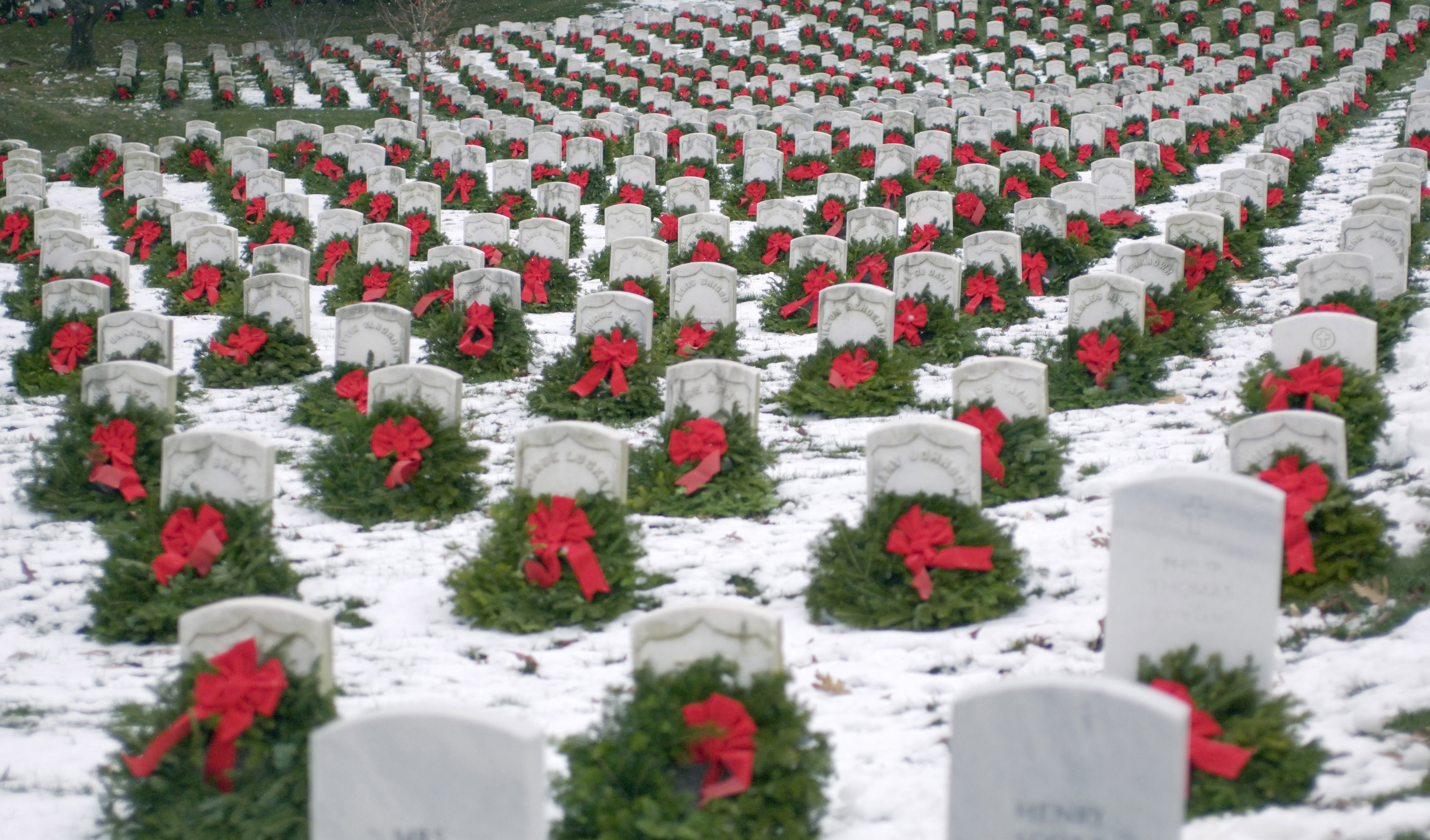
Wreaths donated in 2005 by Worcester Wreath Company in Harrington, Maine, as part of Wreaths Across America

In 1992, the Worcester Wreath company in Harrington, Maine, had a surplus at the end of the Christmas holiday season. Recalling a boyhood trip to Arlington National Cemetery, company founder Morrill Worcester donated 5,000 wreaths to the cemetery to honor the cemetery's dead with the help of volunteers and a local trucking company. In 2005, after 13 years of similar donations, a photo of snowy gravestones covered with wreaths at the cemetery received widespread circulation on the internet. Thousands of people called Worcester Wreath Company, wanting to replicate the wreath-laying service at their own veteran cemeteries. In 2014, volunteers were able to place wreaths in all sections of the cemetery for the first time.

On 22 February 1995, officials of the U.S. Department of Interior and the U.S. Department of the Army signed an agreement to transfer from Arlington House, The Robert E. Lee Memorial, to the U.S. Army a part of Arlington Woods, which was located in Section 29 of the National Park Service at Arlington National Cemetery between Arlington House and Fort Myer. The property transfer, which involved 12 acres (4.9 ha) of NPS land, was intended to permit superintendent Metzler to start expanding the cemetery beyond its existing boundaries.

In September 1996, Arlington Cemetery received the authority to transfer 12 acres (4.9 ha) of woodland from the National Park Service-controlled Arlington House in 2001, 37 acres (15 ha) of land in 1999 from the DoD that was the site of the Navy Annex building, 8 acres (3.2 ha) of land in 1999 from the Department of the Army that was part of Fort Myer, 4 acres (1.6 ha) of land from Arlington County's Southgate Road right-of-way in 2004, and just under 10 acres (4.0 ha) of land from Fort Myer in 2005.

On 23 September 1996, the National Defense Authorization Act for Fiscal Year 1997 (Public Law 104–201) authorized the Secretary of the Interior to transfer to the Secretary of the Army all of the land in Section 29 that was within an "Arlington National Cemetery Interment Zone" and some of the land in the Section that was within a "Robert E. Lee Memorial Preservation Zone".

On 5 March 1998, the National Park Service, a component of the Department of the Interior, informed the National Capital Planning Commission that it wanted to transfer only 4 acres (1.6 ha) to the cemetery, rather than the 12 acres (4.9 ha) that the 1995 agreement had described. In response, Metzler stated: "I was surprised. But we will continue to work with the Department of Interior and see what happens."

On 12 July 1999, the National Park Service published a Federal Register notice, announcing the availability of an environmental assessment for the transfer. The EA stated that the Interment Zone contained the oldest and largest tract of climax eastern hardwood forest in Arlington County. This forest was the same type that once covered the Arlington estate, and had regenerated from trees that were present historically. A forestry study determined that a representative tree was 258 years old. The Interment Zone was also determined to contain significant archeological and cultural landscape resources, in addition to those in the Preservation Zone. The EA described four alternative courses of action.

In contrast to the National Park Service's March 1998 statement to the National Capital Planning Commission, the 1999 environmental assessment stated that the preferred alternative (Alternative 1) would transfer to the cemetery approximately 9.6 acres (3.9 ha), comprising most of the Interment Zone and the northern tip of the Preservation Zone. Another alternative (Alternative 3) would transfer to the cemetery the 12 acres (4.9 ha) Interment Zone, while keeping the 12.5 acres (5.1 ha) Preservation Zone under NPS jurisdiction. The EA concluded: "Public Law 104-201 directed the Secretary of the Interior to transfer to the Secretary of the Army jurisdiction over the Interment Zone, which is the plan in Alternative 3. Adoption of any of the other alternatives would require legislative action to amend the existing law."

In 1998, a Congressional proposal to expand the cemetery onto land that the Navy Annex and Fort Myer then occupied led to concerns that Arlington County officials had not been properly consulted, leading to the withdrawal of the proposal. However, the National Defense Authorization Act for Fiscal Year 2000 (Public Law 106–65), which was enacted into law during October 1999, subsequently required the Secretary of Defense to transfer administrative jurisdiction of the 36 acres (15 ha) Navy Annex property to the Secretary of the Army. The Act required the Secretary of Defense to demolish the Annex's buildings and prepare the property for use as part of the cemetery, while requiring the Secretary of the Army to incorporate the Annex property into the cemetery.

=== 21st century ===
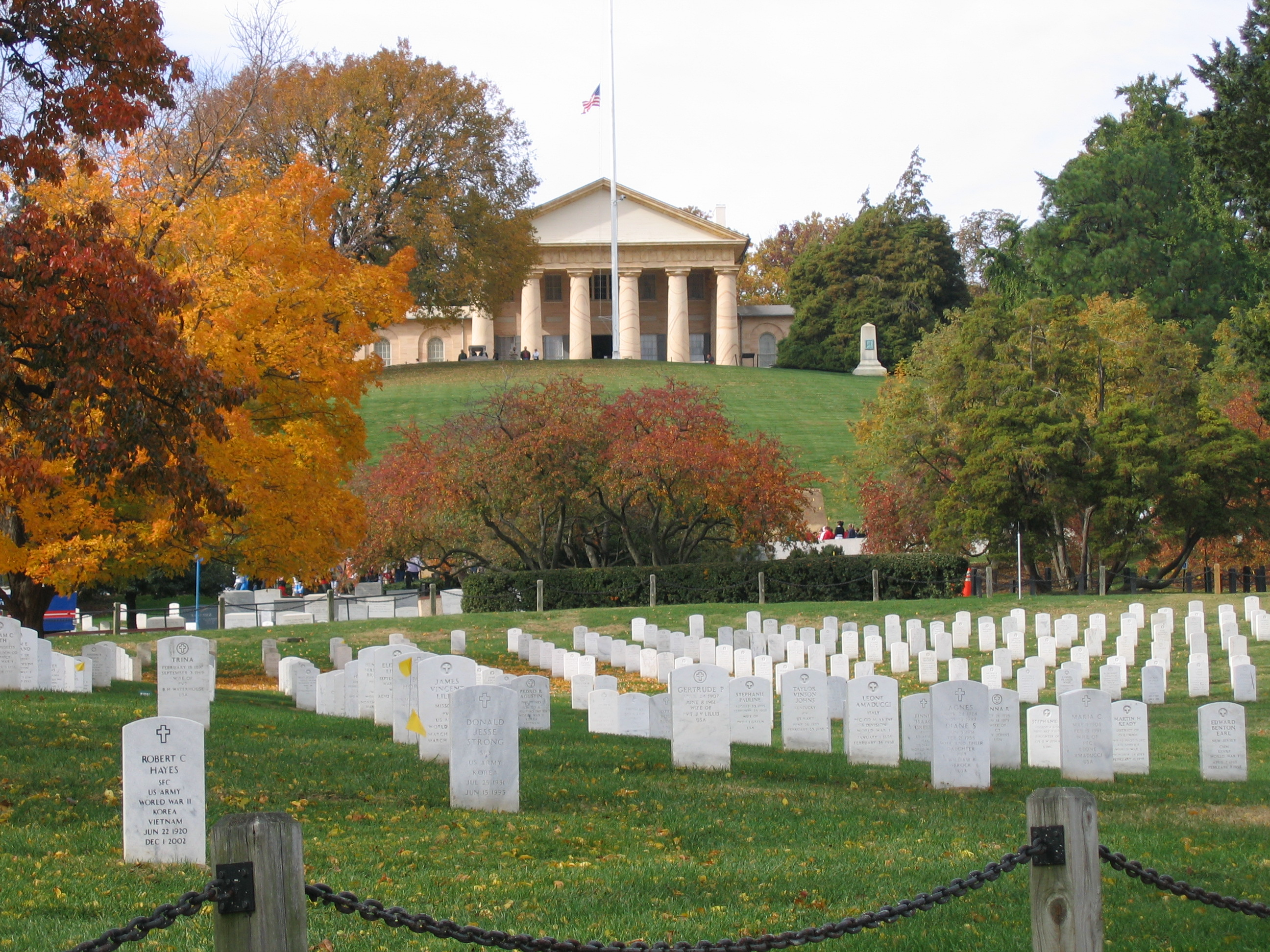
Arlington House in November 2005

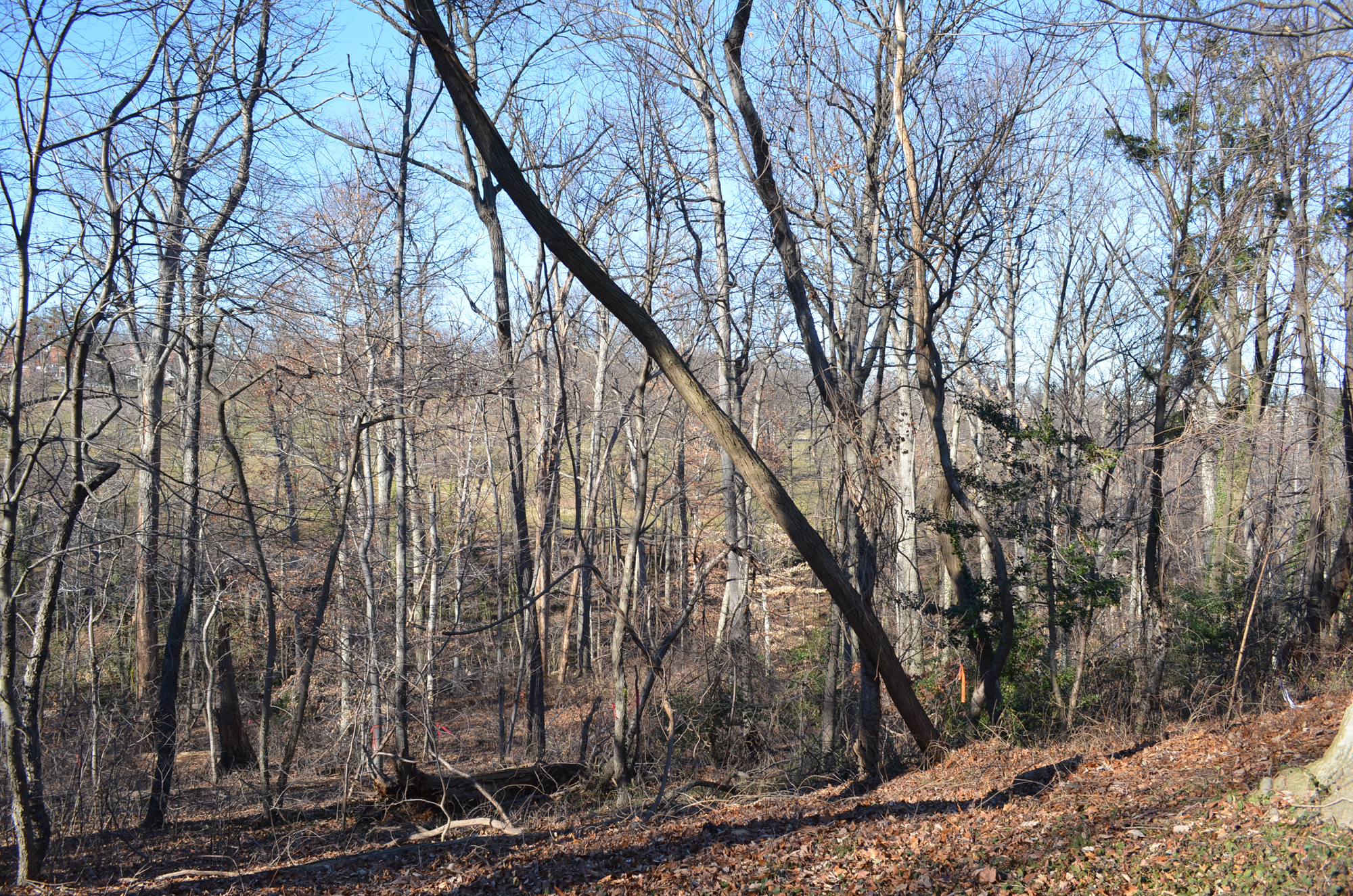
A portion of Arlington Woods on Humphreys Drive in 2013

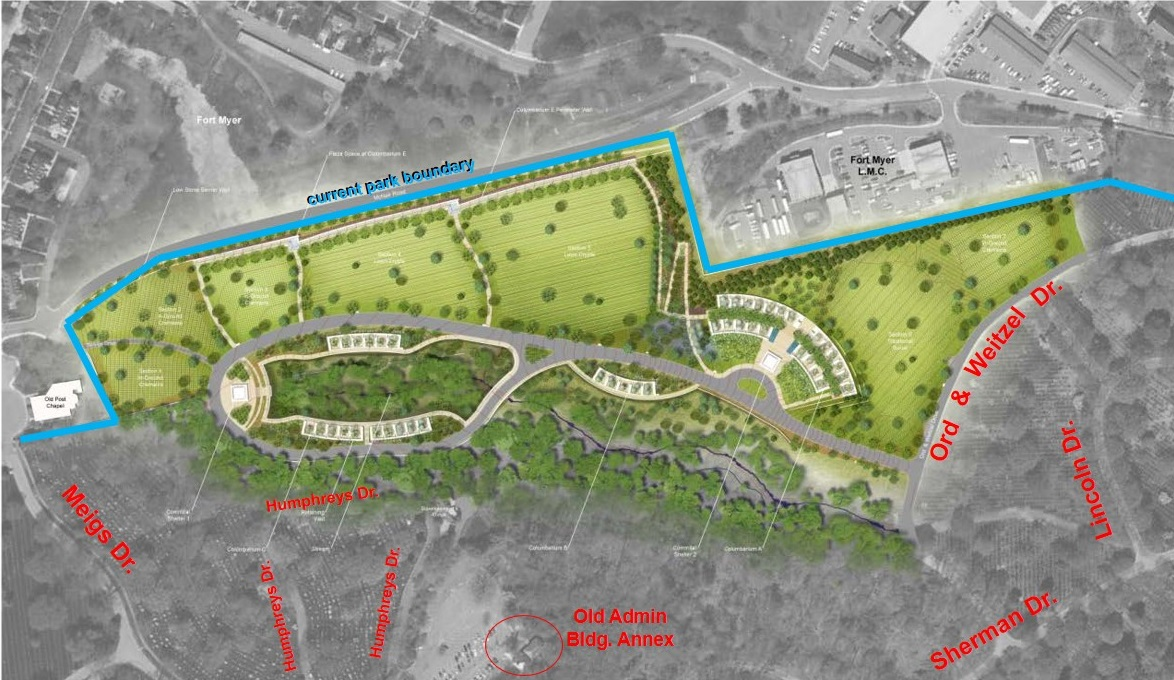
An October 2014 map showing the Millennium Project's expansion of Arlington National Cemetery into Arlington Woods and Fort Myer

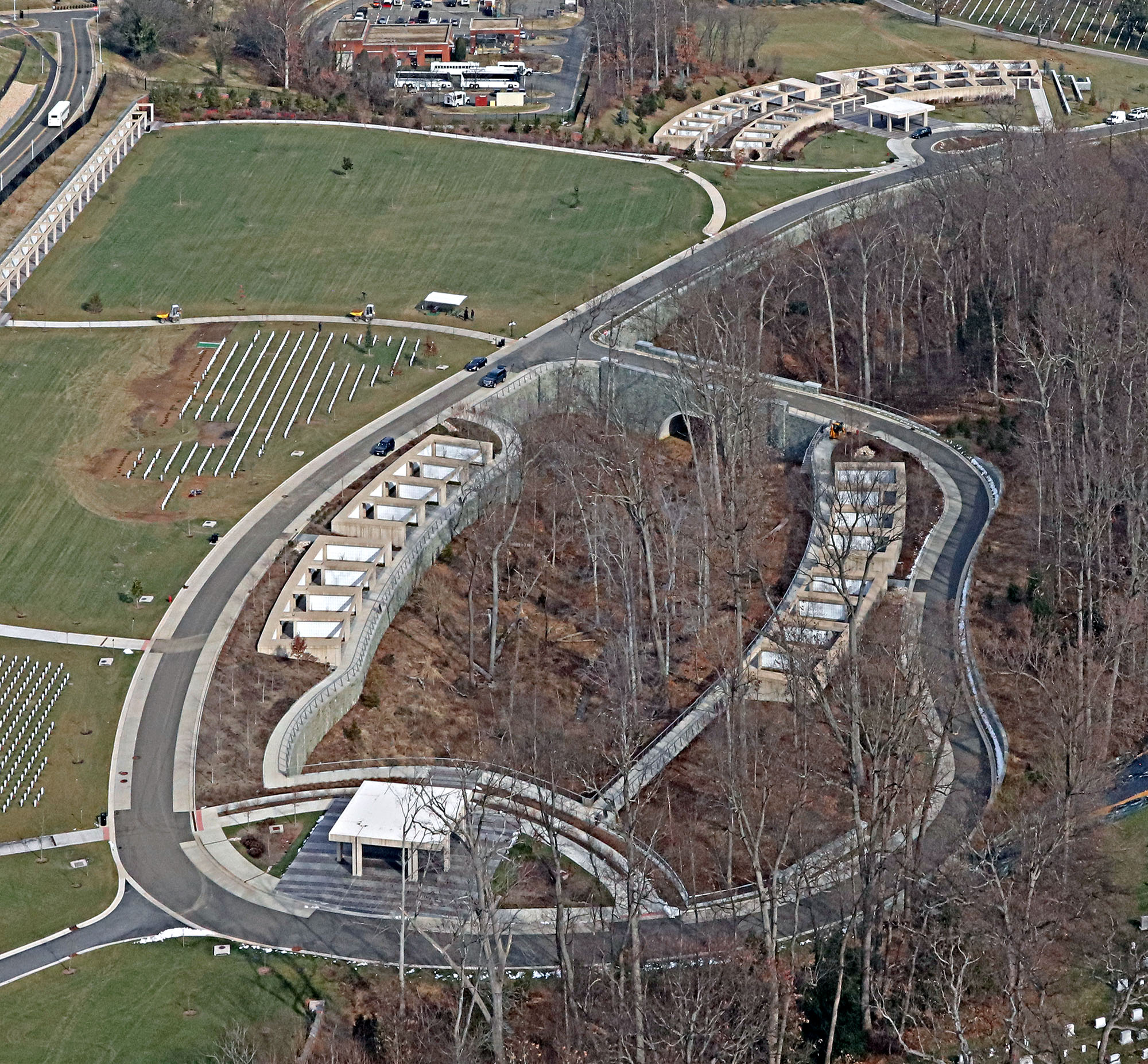
An aerial view of Arlington National Cemetery in January 2022

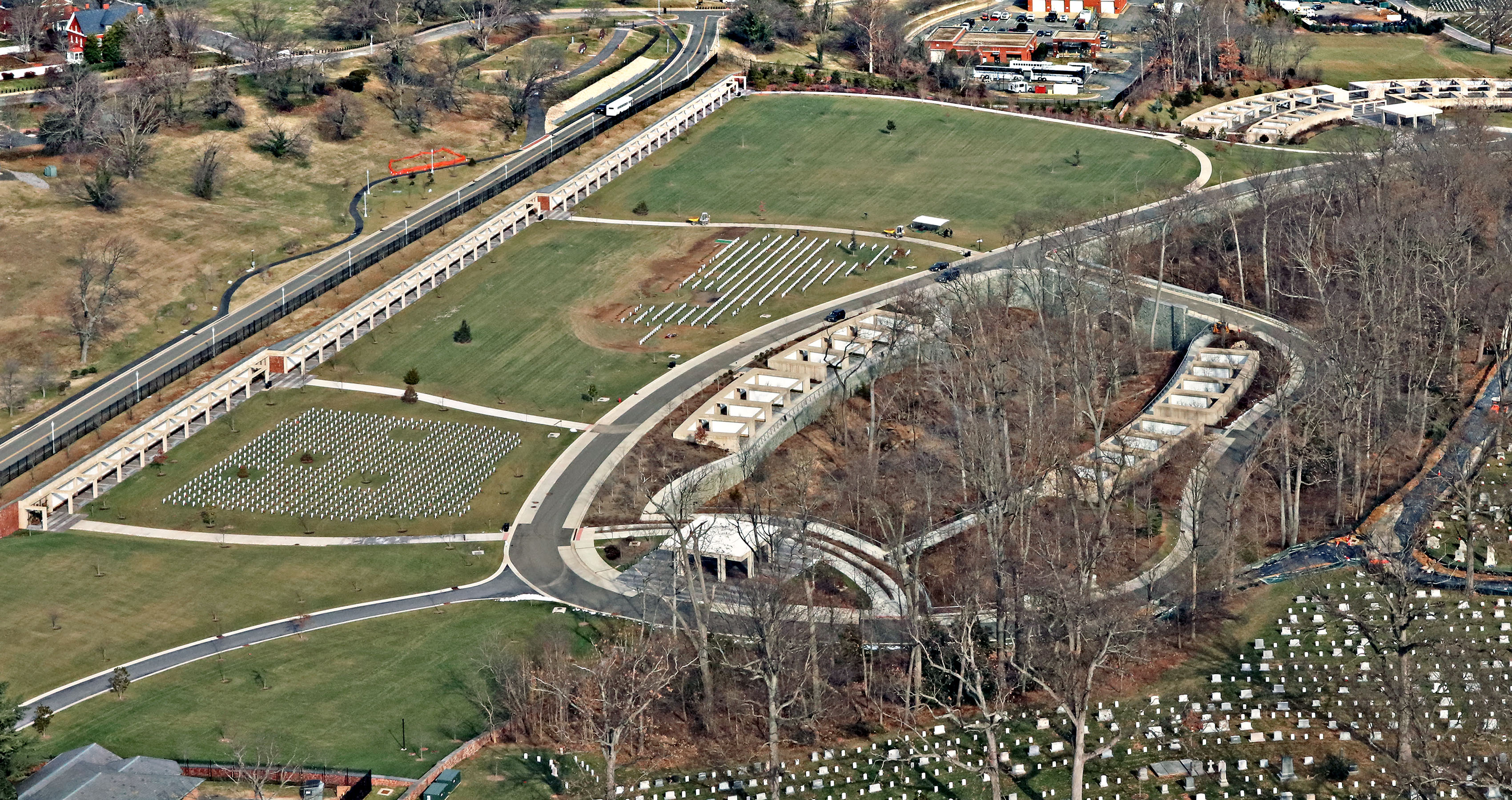
An aerial view of Arlington National Cemetery's Millennium Project in January 2022

On 28 December 2001, the National Defense Authorization Act for Fiscal Year 2002 (Public Law 107-107) repealed the "obsolete" part of Public Law 104-201 that had authorized the transfer of portions of Section 29 to the Secretary of the Army. The new legislation required the Secretary of the Interior to transfer to the Secretary of the Army within 30 days the approximately 12 acres (4.9 ha) Interment Zone. The transfer therefore involved the entire 12 acres (4.9 ha) of NPS land that the 1995 agreement and Alternative 3 in the 1999 EA had described.

The 2001 legislation required the Secretary of the Army to use the Interment Zone for in-ground burial sites and columbarium. In addition, the legislation required the Secretary of the Interior to manage the remainder of Section 29 "in perpetuity to provide a natural setting and visual buffer for Arlington House, the Robert E. Lee Memorial."

In 2007, Metzler implemented the Millennium Project, a $35 million expansion plan to begin utilizing the Arlington woodland, Fort Myer, and Navy Annex land. The project also included converting 40 acres (16 ha) of unused space and 4 acres (16,000 m^{2}) of maintenance property on the cemetery grounds into burial space in 2006 and 2007 to allow an additional 26,000 graves and 5,000 inurnments. The Millennium Project expanded the cemetery's physical boundaries for the first time since the 1960s, and was the largest expansion of burial space at the site since the U.S. Civil War. Several environmental and historical preservation groups criticized Metzler's plans, as did the NPS and the manager of Arlington House.

==== 2010 mismanagement controversy ====
On 9 June 2010, United States Secretary of the Army John M. McHugh reprimanded the cemetery's superintendent, John C. Metzler, Jr., and his deputy, Thurman Higgenbotham, after a DOD inspector general's report revealed that cemetery officials had placed the wrong headstones on tombs, buried coffins in shallow graves, and buried bodies on top of one another. Metzler, who had already announced his intention to retire, admitted some mistakes had been made but denied allegations of widespread or serious mismanagement. The investigation also found that cemetery employees were burdened in their day-to-day work by "dysfunctional management, lack of established policy and procedures, and an overall unhealthy organizational climate." Both Metzler and Higgenbotham retired soon after the investigation commenced.

In March 2011, as a result of the problems discovered, Kathryn Condon, the recently appointed executive director of the Army National Military Cemeteries, announced that the cemetery's staff had been increased from 102 to 159. She added that the cemetery was also acquiring additional equipment because, "They didn't have the proper equipment to do the job really to the standard they needed to do."

The mismanagement controversy included a limitation on mass media access to funerals, which also proved controversial. Until 2005, the cemetery's administration gave free access, with the family's permission, to the press to cover funerals at the cemetery. In July 2008, The Washington Post reported that the cemetery had imposed gradually increasing restrictions on media coverage of funerals beginning three years earlier, in 2005.

After the cemetery's management controversy began to end, the Army appointed Patrick K. Hallinan the acting superintendent of the cemetery in June 2010. He was promoted permanently to the position in October 2010. Hallinan had previously worked for the Office of Field Programs in the National Cemetery Administration, an agency of the United States Department of Veterans' Affairs. In that capacity, Hallinan had oversight of 131 national cemeteries, national cemetery policy, procedures, and operations. Hallinan was promoted to executive director of the Army National Military Cemeteries upon the retirement of Kathryn Condon in spring 2014.

In May 2014, Jack E. Lechner, Jr was superintendent of the cemetery. Lechner had been a funeral director for 10 years in the private sector before joining the U.S. Army. He rose to the rank of colonel, and retired in November 2011 after having spent 2008 to 2010 as chief of the Supply Division of the Joint Chiefs of Staff, overseeing the equipping security forces in Iraq and Afghanistan. Since 2010, he served as executive officer and deputy superintendent of the cemetery under Hallinan.

In September 2008, environmentalists expressed concerns that the agreement would result in the partial destruction of the 24-acre (9.7 ha) remnant of a historically important stand of native trees. A historical marker near the woodland notes that, while visiting Arlington House in 1825, Marquis de Lafayette, the French volunteer to the Continental Army who ultimately became one of George Washington's long-standing friends, warned Mary Lee Fitzhugh Custis, wife of George Washington Parke Custis, "Cherish these forest trees around your mansion. Recollect how much easier it is to cut a tree than to make one grow." The marker notes that the Virginia Native Plant Society recognized the woodland as being one of the best examples of old growth terraced gravel forest remaining in Virginia.

On 12 December 2012, the United States Army Corps of Engineers asked for comments on a draft environmental assessment that described a further expansion of Arlington National Cemetery as part of the Millennium Project.

The 2012 draft environmental assessment was intended to implement conversion into burial space of the 17 acres (6.9 ha) of Fort Myer grounds and 10 acres (4.0 ha) of Section 29 woodland. The draft described seven alternatives. The preferred alternative (Alternative E) called for the removal of about one-half of the 1,700 trees with a diameter of 6 inches (15 cm) or greater on the site. About 640 of the trees were within a 135-year-old portion of Arlington Woods. The draft concluded, "Based on the evaluation of environmental impacts....., no significant impacts would be expected from the Proposed Action; therefore, an Environmental Impact Statement will not be prepared and a Finding of No Significant Impact will be prepared and signed."

In January 2013, the county manager of Arlington County, Virginia, and the executive director of the Army National Military Cemeteries (consisting of Arlington National Cemetery and the United States Soldiers' and Airmen's Home National Cemetery) signed a memorandum of understanding (MOU) between the Arlington County Board and the Department of the Army to expand the cemetery even further. Under the tentative plan, Arlington County would give up the easement for Southgate Road (which lies between the Navy Annex property and the cemetery's 2012 boundary), and obtain a narrow easement along the southwest border of the Navy Annex site for a new Southgate Road. In exchange, the Department of Defense would give the Navy Annex parking lot to the county.

The Army would also transfer land west of South Joyce Street to Columbia Pike to Arlington County. Additionally, the Commonwealth of Virginia would convey to the cemetery roughly the northern half of the Virginia Department of Transportation land bounded by South Joyce Street, Columbia Pike, and South Washington Boulevard. The cloverleaf interchange between Columbia Pike and S. Washington Blvd. would be eliminated, and the hairpin turn in Columbia Pike straightened, to provide a safer, more natural exit from S. Washington Blvd. onto Columbia Pike. Although exact acreages were not specified and the plan depended upon the Commonwealth of Virginia's cooperation, the MOU if implemented would have created a more contiguous plot of land for the cemetery.

On 12 March 2013, the Corps of Engineers released a revised environmental assessment for the Millennium Project.

The revised environmental assessment included copies of a number of public comments on the draft that criticized the project and parts of the assessment while proposing alternative locations for new military burials near the cemetery and elsewhere. However, the Department of Forestry of the Commonwealth of Virginia found that, based on information in the draft environmental assessment, the project would not have a significant adverse impact on the Commonwealth's forest resources. The revised EA did not change the preferred alternative (Alternative E) or the Army's plans to prepare and sign the Finding of No Significant Impact (FONSI) that the draft EA had described.

On 26 March 2013, the Consolidated and Further Continuing Appropriations Act, 2013 (Public Law 113–6) appropriated to the DoD $84 million to plan, design and construct the Millennium Project. The legislation additionally appropriated to the DoD $19 million to study, plan and design a future expansion of the cemetery's burial space.

On 5 June 2013, after reviewing 100 public comments that it had received on the revised environmental assessment, the Corps of Engineers released a final EA and a signed FONSI for the Millennium Project. The Final EA and the FONSI retained Alternative E as the preferred alternative. The final environmental assessment stated that, of the 905 trees to be removed, 771 trees were healthy native trees that had diameters between six and 41 inches.

The project involved removing approximately 211 trees from a less than 2.63 acres (1.06 ha) area containing a portion of a 145-year-old forest that stood within the property boundaries of a historic district that a National Register of Historic Places nomination form for Arlington House had described in 1966. About 491 trees would be removed from an area of trees that was approximately 105 years old. Approximately 203 trees with ages of 50 to 145 years would be removed from a former picnic area. At a public hearing on 11 July 2013, the National Capital Planning Commission approved the site and building plans for the Millennium Project.

In August 2015, the U.S. Army removed Lechner as superintendent of the cemetery after a performance review "called into question his ability to serve successfully as a senior leader". The Army declined to elaborate further until the Army could find a successor. In December 2016, the National Defense Authorization Act for Fiscal Year 2017 (Public Law 114–328) authorized the Secretary of the Army to expand the cemetery by acquiring from Arlington County and the Commonwealth of Virginia by condemnation and other means properties near the cemetery that contain the Southgate Road, South Joyce Street and Washington Boulevard right-of-ways, including the Washington Boulevard-Columbia Pike interchange. The Army then informed the Arlington County government in June 2017 that the Army would no longer pursue a land exchange with the county. The Army told the County that the Army would use the entire Navy Annex site to expand the cemetery and would acquire for the cemetery about 5 acres (2.0 ha) of public land that Arlington County then owned. The Army would also acquire for the cemetery expansion about 7 acres (2.8 ha) of land located between Columbia Pike and Interstate 395 that the Commonwealth of Virginia then owned.

In 2018, the US Army Corps of Engineers announced the expansion would allow for 40,000 to 60,000 additional burials and will incorporate the existing United States Air Force Memorial. Construction of roadways is planned for 2021–2023 and of the actual cemetery 2023–2025. Total cost of the project is $274 million. The project covers 70 acres (28 ha) and by closing and relocating local roadways, allows the cemetery to utilize the former Navy annex property and remain contiguous. The Columbia Pike and interchange will be realigned to maximize burial space. The existing Operations Complex will also be relocated south of the Columbia Pike and its current location will become burial space. The expansion is projected to keep the cemetery open into the middle of the century.

==== 150th anniversary ====
During May and June 2014, the cemetery celebrated the 150th anniversary of its founding with a month-long series of events, tours, and lectures. During these celebrations, cemetery officials formally re-designated the Old Amphitheater as the James Tanner Amphitheater. James R. Tanner was a Union Army officer who lost both legs during the war. He later became a War Department stenographer, and recorded much of the early evidence in the investigation into the assassination of Abraham Lincoln. He later was active in the Grand Army of the Republic, a Union Army veterans group. Tanner is buried a few yards from the amphitheater.

=== Management ===
On 2 March 2017, Katharine Kelley, a former U.S. Army officer and senior executive service civilian employee for the Department of the Army, was appointed superintendent of the cemetery. She moved to another Army position in March 2019 after failing at Arlington National Cemetery as superintendent.

Three years later, on 18 February 2020, Charles R. "Ray" Alexander, a former U.S. Army colonel and senior executive service civilian employee for the Department of the Army, was appointed superintendent of the cemetery.

== Sections ==
Graves of formerly enslaved people, marked "Citizen", in Section 27

The Cemetery is divided into 70 sections, with some sections in the southeast and western part of the cemetery reserved for future expansion. Section 60, in the southeast part of the cemetery, is the burial ground for military personnel killed in the "war on terror" since 2001. Section 21, also known as the Nurses Section, is the burial site for many nurses, and the location of the Spanish–American War Nurses Memorial and the Nurses Memorial. Another section – Chaplains Hill – includes monuments to Jewish, Protestant, and Roman Catholic military chaplains.

In 1901, Confederate soldiers buried at the Soldiers' Home and various locations within Arlington were reinterred in a Confederate section that was authorized by Congress in 1900. On 4 June 1914, the United Daughters of the Confederacy dedicated the Confederate Memorial designed by Moses Ezekiel. Upon his death in 1917, Ezekiel was buried at the base of the monument as he was a veteran of the Confederate army. All Confederate headstones in this section are peaked rather than rounded. The Naming Commission, appointed by Congress, has recommended removing the Confederate memorial down to its foundation.

More than 3,800 formerly enslaved people, called "Contrabands" during the Civil War, were buried in Section 27 between 1864 and 1867. Their headstones are designated with the word "Civilian" or "Citizen".

In early 2025, Arlington National Cemetery's website deleted its lists of "notable graves" of Black, Hispanic, and female service members, while continuing to showcase those of notable politicians, sportspeople and foreigners. Also during this interval histories of the Arlington Freedmen's Village and Section 27—among six other education modules—were removed from history link menus on the U.S. government website for Arlington. Those histories remain live and are linked from a historical narrative published on the website. A spokesperson for the cemetery stated that the changes were prompted by the Trump administration's orders requiring the removal of race and gender-related language and policies, and said that the academic modules would return after review and updating.

== Grave markers, niches, and headstones ==
Gravestones at the cemetery are marked by U.S. flags each Memorial Day

The United States Department of Veterans Affairs oversees the National Cemetery Administration's orders for placement of inscriptions and faith emblems at no charge to the estate of the deceased, submitted with information provided by the next of kin that is placed on upright marble headstones or columbarium niche covers. As of March 2026, the Department of Veterans Affairs offers 98 authorized faith emblems for placement on markers to represent the deceased's faith. Over time this number grew as the result of legal challenges to policy.

Prior to 2007, the United States Department of Veterans Affairs (VA) did not allow the use of the pentacle as an "emblem of belief" on tombstones in military cemeteries. This policy was changed following an out-of-court settlement on 23 April following a series of lawsuits by the family of Patrick Stewart against the VA.

Between 1947 and 2001, privately purchased markers were permitted in the cemetery. The sections in which the cemetery permitted such markers are nearly filled and the cemetery generally does not allow new burials in these sections. Nevertheless, the older sections of the cemetery have a wide variety of private markers placed prior to 2001, including an artillery piece.

There are 32 British Commonwealth war dead burials, 12 from World War I and 20 from World War II and some headstones are Commonwealth War Graves Commission style.

== Arlington Memorial Amphitheater ==
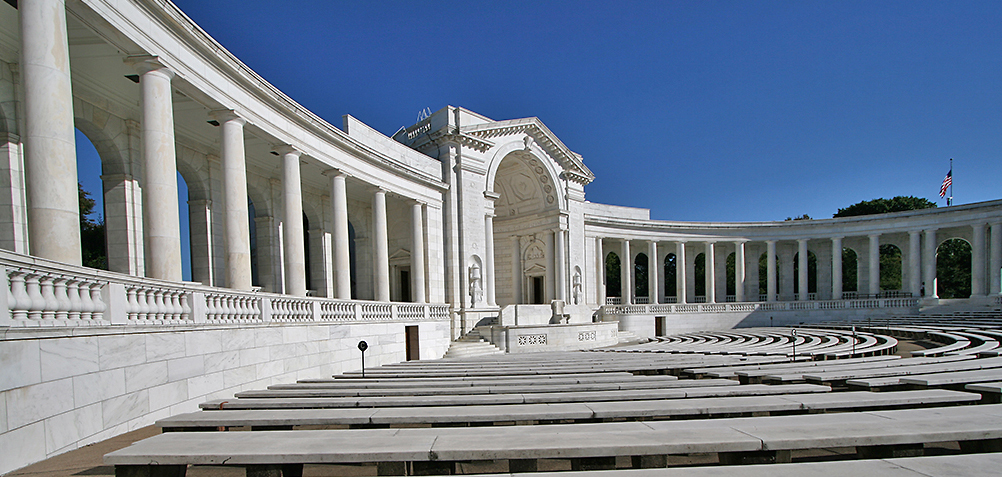
The interior of Memorial Amphitheater

The Tomb of the Unknown Soldier is part of the Arlington Memorial Amphitheater. The Memorial Amphitheater has hosted state funerals and Memorial Day and Veterans Day ceremonies. Ceremonies are also held for Easter. About 5,000 people attend these holiday ceremonies each year. The structure is mostly built of Imperial Danby marble from Vermont. The Memorial Display room, between the amphitheater and the Tomb of the Unknown Soldier, uses Botticino stone, imported from Italy. The amphitheater was the result of a campaign by Ivory Kimball to construct a place to honor America's servicemen/women. Congress authorized the structure on 4 March 1913. Woodrow Wilson laid the cornerstone for the building on 15 October 1915. The cornerstone contained 15 items including a Bible and a copy of the Constitution.

Before the Arlington Memorial Amphitheater was completed in 1921, important ceremonies were held at what is now known as the "Old Amphitheater". This structure sits where Robert E. Lee once had his gardens. The amphitheater was built in 1868 under the direction of Civil War General John A. Logan. Gen. James A. Garfield was the featured speaker at the Decoration Day dedication ceremony, 30 May 1868, later being elected as President of the United States in 1880. The amphitheater has an encircling colonnade with a latticed roof that once supported a web of vines. The amphitheater has a marble dais, known as "the rostrum", which is inscribed with the U.S. national motto found on the Great Seal of the United States, E pluribus unum ("Out of many, one"). The rostrum was designed by General Montgomery C. Meigs, then Quartermaster General of the U.S. Army. The amphitheater seats 1,500 people and has hosted speakers such as William Jennings Bryan.

== Memorials ==
=== Tomb of the Unknown Soldier ===
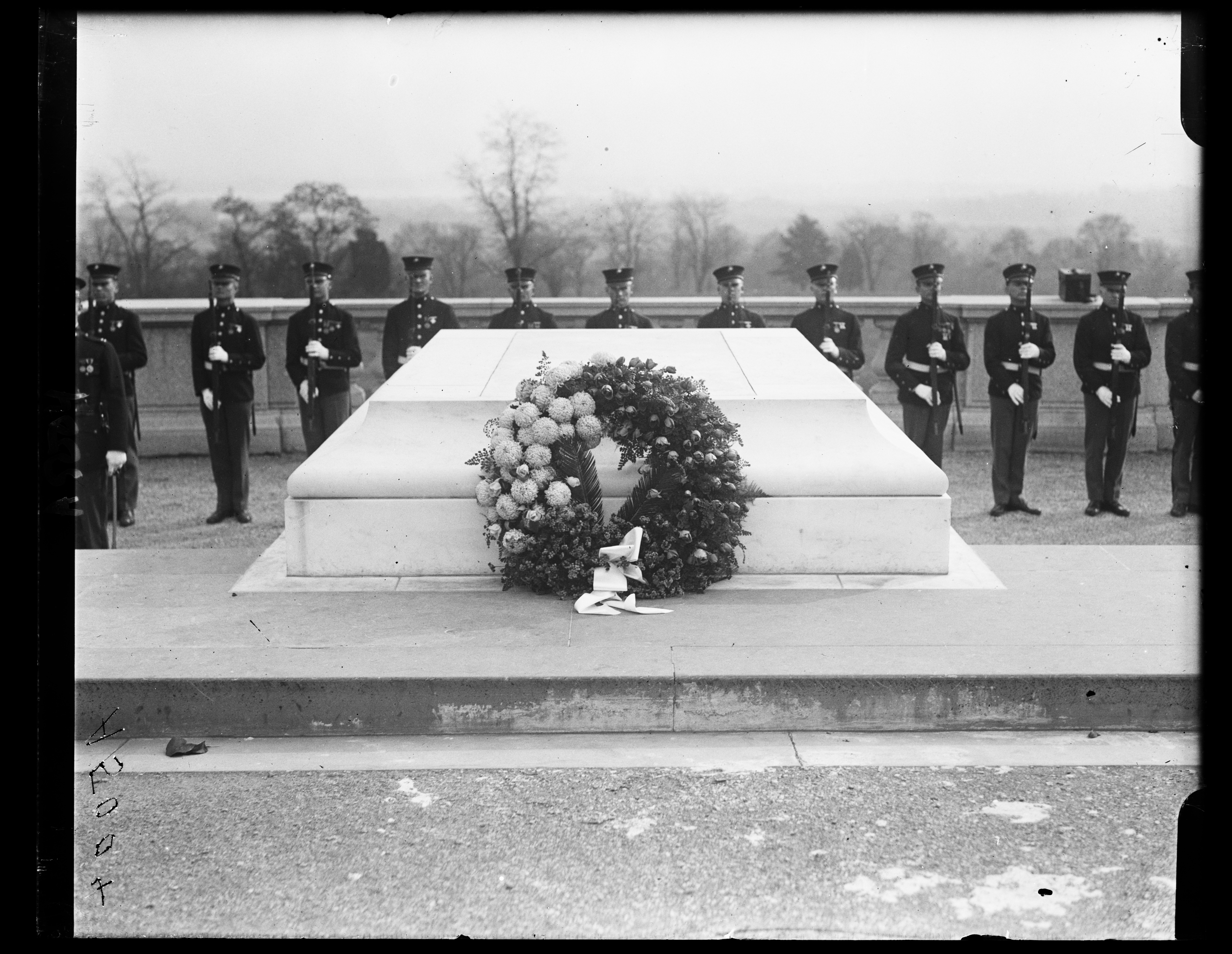
Tomb of the Unknown Soldier in 1922

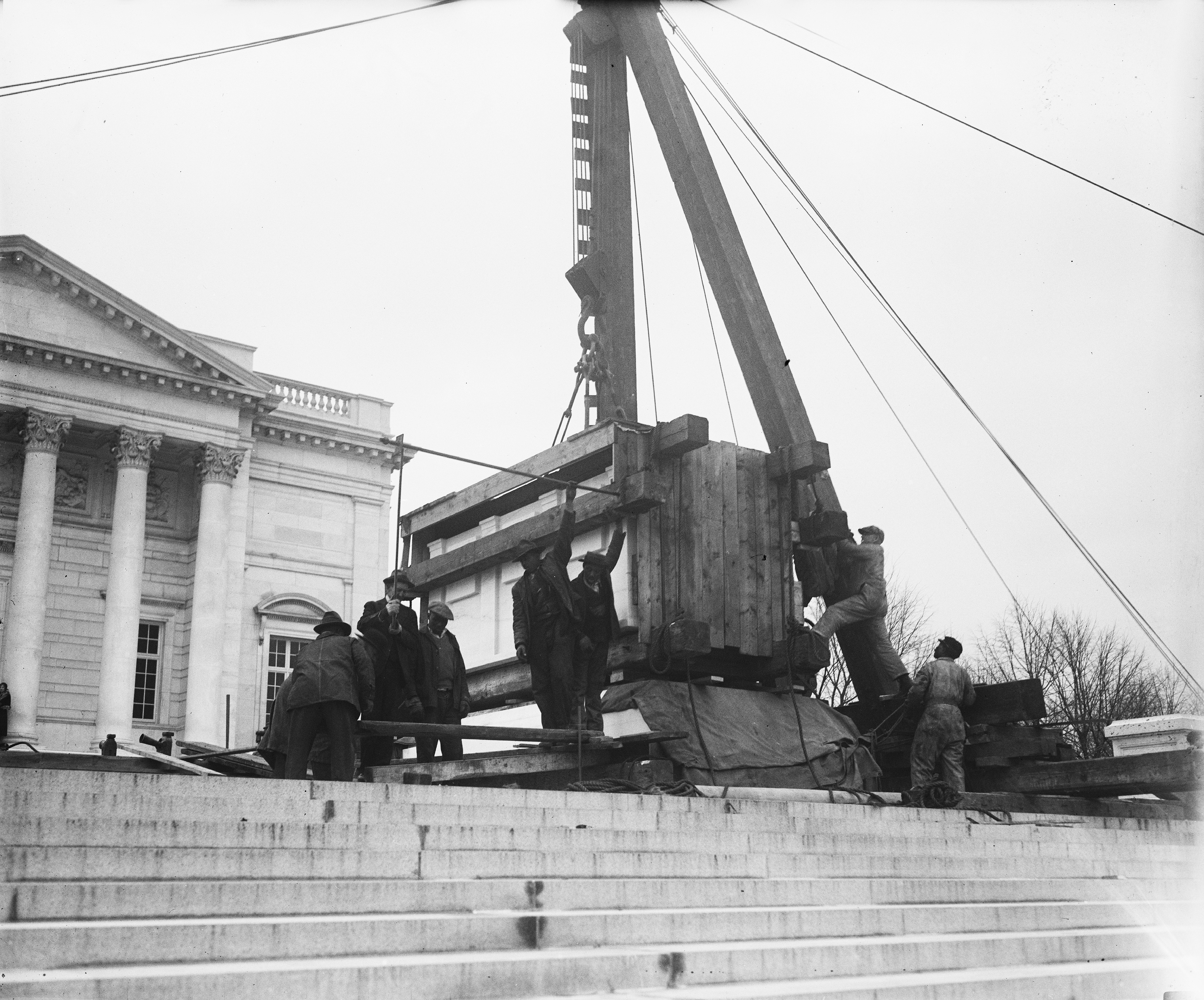
Installation of the marble sarcophagus on top of the unknown WWI veteran tomb (1931)

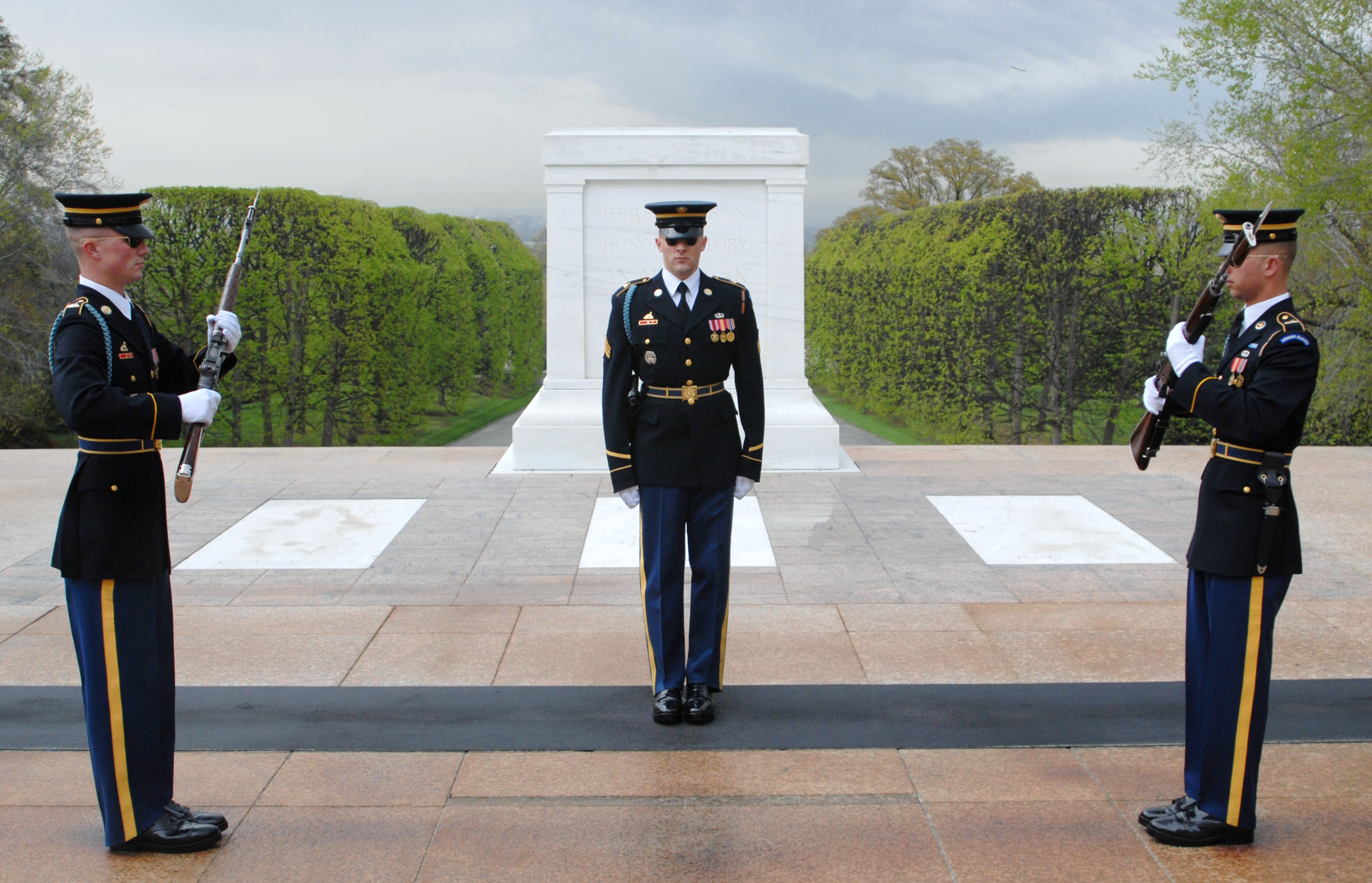
Honor guards (2005)

The Tomb of the Unknown Soldier stands on top of a hill overlooking Washington, D.C. One of the more well-attended sites at the cemetery, the tomb is made from Yule marble quarried in Colorado. It consists of seven pieces, with a total weight of 79 short tons (72 metric tons). The tomb was completed and opened to the public 9 April 1932, at a cost of $48,000.

Other unknown servicemen were later placed in crypts there, and it also became known as the Tomb of the Unknowns, though it has never been officially named. The soldiers entombed there are:

- Unknown Soldier of World War I, entombed 11 November 1921; President Warren G. Harding presided
- Unknown Soldier of World War II, interred 30 May 1958; President Dwight D. Eisenhower presided
- Unknown Soldier of the Korean War, also interred 30 May 1958; President Dwight Eisenhower presided again, Vice President Richard Nixon acted as next of kin
- Unknown Soldier of the Vietnam War, interred 28 May 1984; President Ronald Reagan presided. The remains of the Vietnam Unknown were disinterred, under the authority of President Bill Clinton, on 14 May 1998, and were identified as those of Air Force first Lt. Michael J. Blassie, whose family had them reinterred near their home in St. Louis, Missouri. It has been determined that the crypt at the Tomb of the Unknowns that contained the remains of the Vietnam Unknown will remain empty.

The Tomb of the Unknown Soldier has been perpetually guarded since 2 July 1937, by the U.S. Army. The 3rd U.S. Infantry Regiment ("The Old Guard") began guarding the Tomb on 6 April 1948. There is a meticulous routine that the guard follows when watching over the graves. The Tomb Guard:

1. Marches 21 steps southward down the black mat behind the Tomb
2. Turns left, facing east for 21 seconds
3. Turns left, facing north for 21 seconds
4. Takes 21 steps down the mat
5. Repeats the routine until the soldier is relieved of duty at the changing of the guard

After each turn, the Guard executes a sharp "shoulder-arms" movement to place the weapon on the shoulder closest to the visitors to signify that the Guard stands between the Tomb and any possible threat.

Twenty-one was chosen because it symbolizes the highest military honor that can be bestowed – the 21-gun salute. The numbers in 1776, the founding of the Republic, add up to 21.

At each turn, the guard makes precise movements followed by a loud click of the heels as the soldier snaps them together. The guard is changed every half-hour during daylight in the summer, and every hour during daylight in the winter and every two hours at night (when the cemetery is closed to the public), regardless of weather conditions.

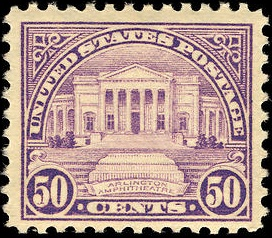
Arlington Amphitheater 1922 issue

A commemorative stamp was issued on 11 November 1922, the first anniversary of the first entombment picturing the Amphitheater. It encompasses the original Tomb of the Unknown Soldier. The remains of an unidentified American soldier from World War I were entombed on Armistice Day, 11 November 1921, later covered in 1931 by a more elaborate marble sarcophagus.

=== Other memorials ===
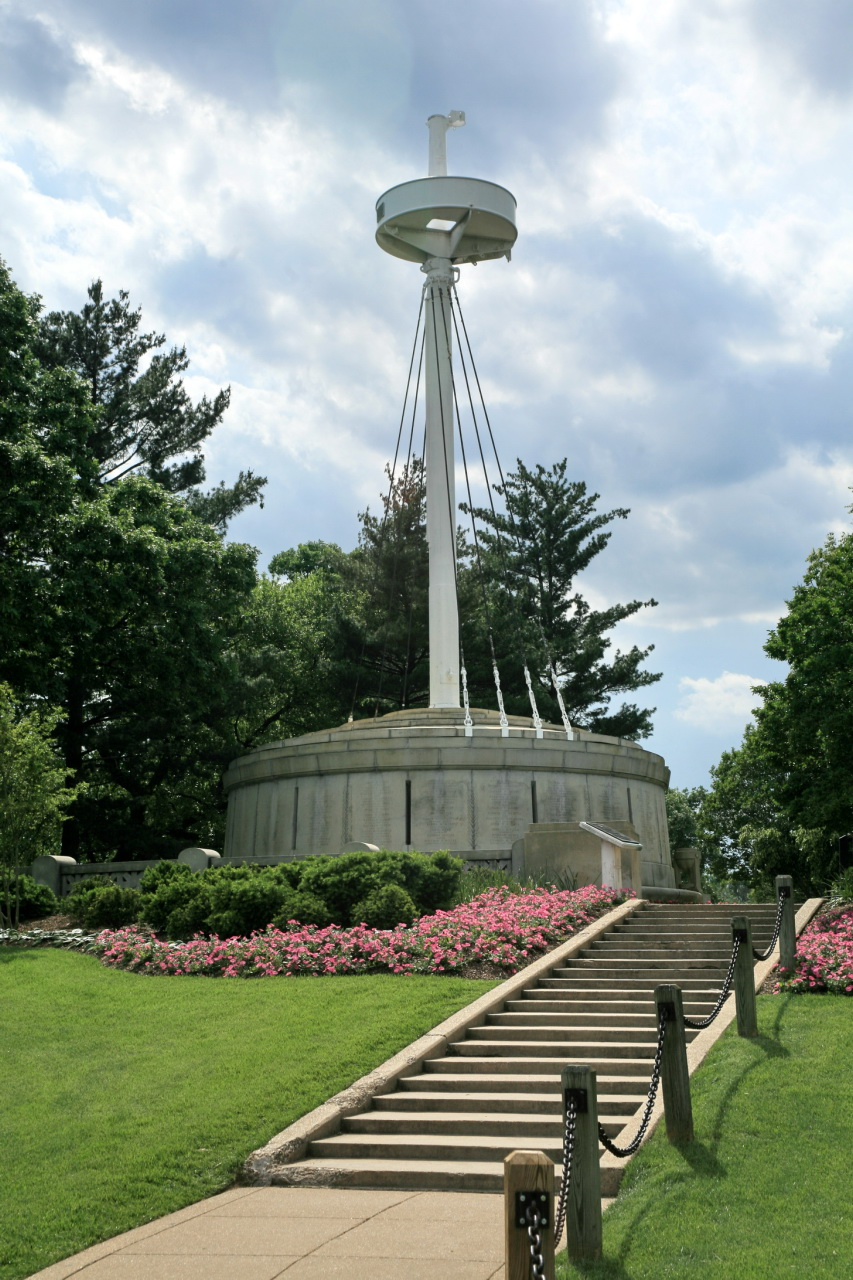
The USS Maine Mast Memorial

There are several memorials on the grounds of the cemetery. However, due to the lack of space for burials and the large amount of space that memorials take up, the U.S. Army now requires a joint or concurrent resolution from Congress before it will place new memorials at Arlington.

Near the Tomb of the Unknowns stands the USS Maine Mast Memorial, which commemorates the 266 men who died aboard the USS Maine. The memorial is built around a mast salvaged from the ship's wreckage. The memorial served as the temporary resting place for two foreign heads of state or government who died in exile in the United States during World War II, Manuel L. Quezon of the Philippines and Ignacy Jan Paderewski of Poland.

The Space Shuttle Challenger Memorial was dedicated on 20 May 1986, in memory of the crew of flight STS-51-L, who died during launch on 28 January 1986. Transcribed on the back of the stone is the text of the John Gillespie Magee, Jr. poem "High Flight", which was quoted by then President Ronald Reagan when he addressed the disaster. Although many remains were identified and returned to the families for private burial, some were not, and were laid to rest under the marker. Two crew members, Dick Scobee and Michael Smith, are buried in Arlington. On 1 February 2004, NASA Administrator Sean O'Keefe dedicated a similar memorial to those who died when the Shuttle Columbia broke apart during reentry on 1 February 2003. Astronauts Laurel Clark, David Brown, and Michael Anderson, who were killed in the Columbia disaster, are also buried in Arlington.

The Lockerbie Cairn is a memorial to the 270 killed in the bombing of Pan Am Flight 103 over Lockerbie, Scotland. The memorial is constructed of 270 stones, one for each person killed in the disaster. In section 64, a memorial to the 184 victims of the 11 September attacks on the Pentagon was dedicated 11 September 2002. The memorial takes the shape of a pentagon, and lists the names of all the victims who were killed. Unidentified remains from the victims are buried beneath it.

On 25 June 1925, President Calvin Coolidge approved a request to erect a Commonwealth Cross of Sacrifice with the names of all the citizens of the United States who died fighting in the Canadian forces during World War I. The monument was dedicated 11 November 1927, and after the Korean War and World War II the names of US citizens who died in those conflicts were added.

In 2008, a bronze Braille flag was installed as a monument to blinded or blind veterans, service members, and other Americans after the passing of the H.R. 4169 American Braille Flag Memorial Act.

The Laos Memorial, or Lao Veterans of America memorial, dedicated to Lao and Hmong veterans who served with US Special Forces and CIA advisors during the Vietnam War, to defend the Royal Kingdom of Laos from the North Vietnamese invasion of Laos, is located on Grant Avenue near the eternal flame memorial to U.S. President John F. Kennedy.

In 2012, legislation began moving through Congress to approve a "Place of Remembrance" at the cemetery. The memorial will be an ossuary designed to contain fragments of remains which are unidentifiable through DNA analysis. The remains will be cremated before placement in the memorial.

== Burial procedures ==
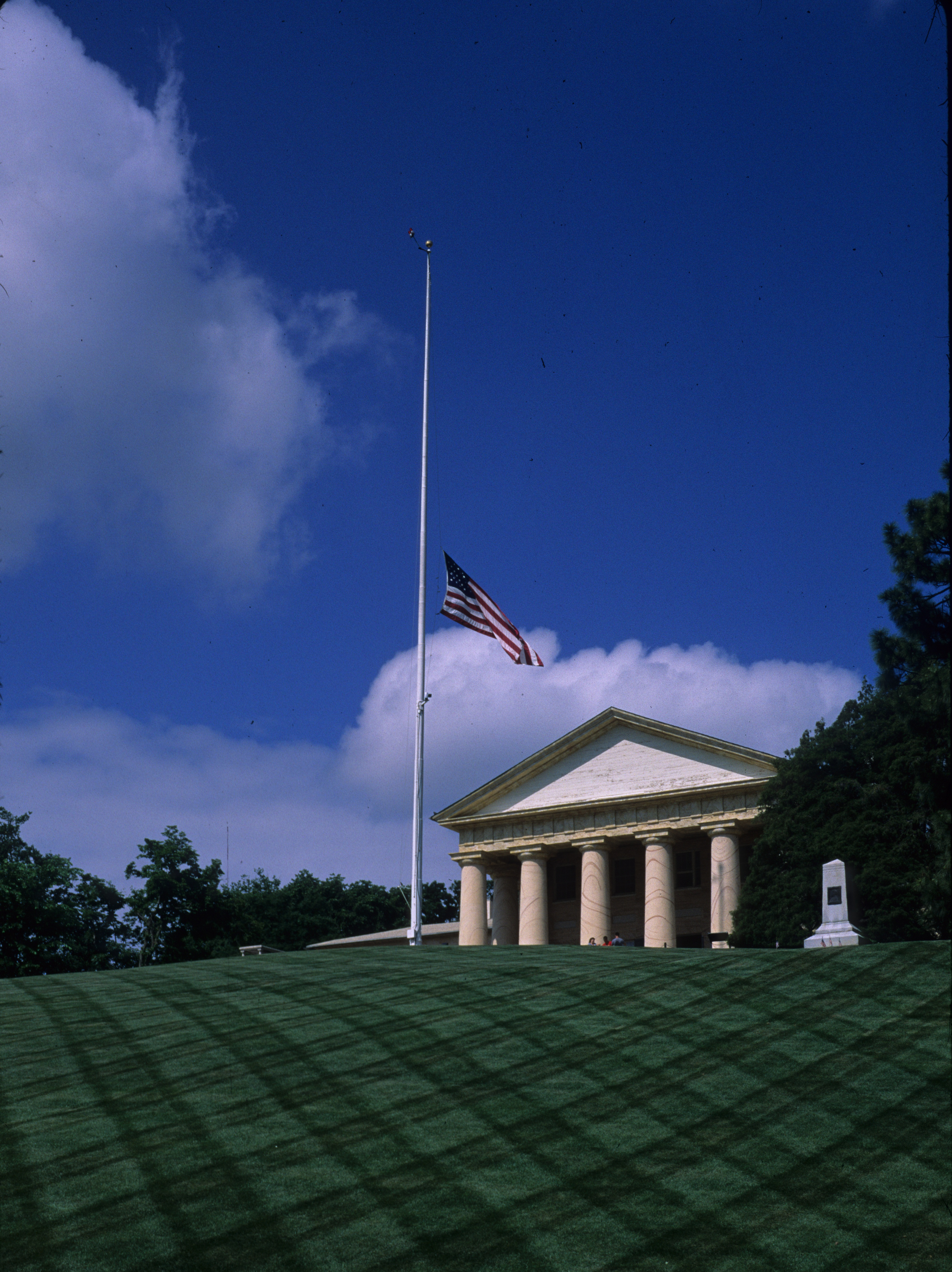
The flag at Arlington House is lowered to half-staff during interments.

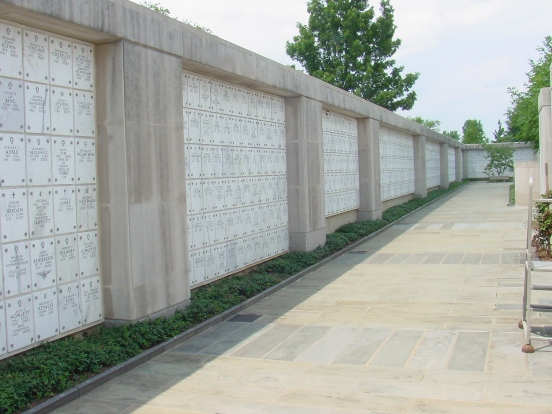
The columbarium is for individuals whose remains were cremated.

The flags in the cemetery are flown at half-staff from a half-hour before the first funeral until a half hour after the last funeral each day. Funerals are normally conducted five days a week, excluding weekends.

Funerals, including interments and inurnments, average between 27 and 30 per day. The cemetery conducts approximately 6,900 burials each year.

With more than 400,000 interments, the cemetery has the second-largest number of burials of any national cemetery in the United States. The largest of the 130 national cemeteries is Calverton National Cemetery, on Long Island, near Riverhead, New York, which conducts more than 7,000 burials annually.

In addition to in-ground burial, the cemetery also has one of the larger columbaria for cremated remains in the country. Four courts are currently in use, each with 5,000 niches. When construction is complete, there will be nine courts with a total of 50,000 niches; capacity for 100,000 remains. Any honorably discharged veteran is eligible for inurnment in the columbarium, if they served on active duty at some point in their career (other than for training).

=== Burial criteria ===
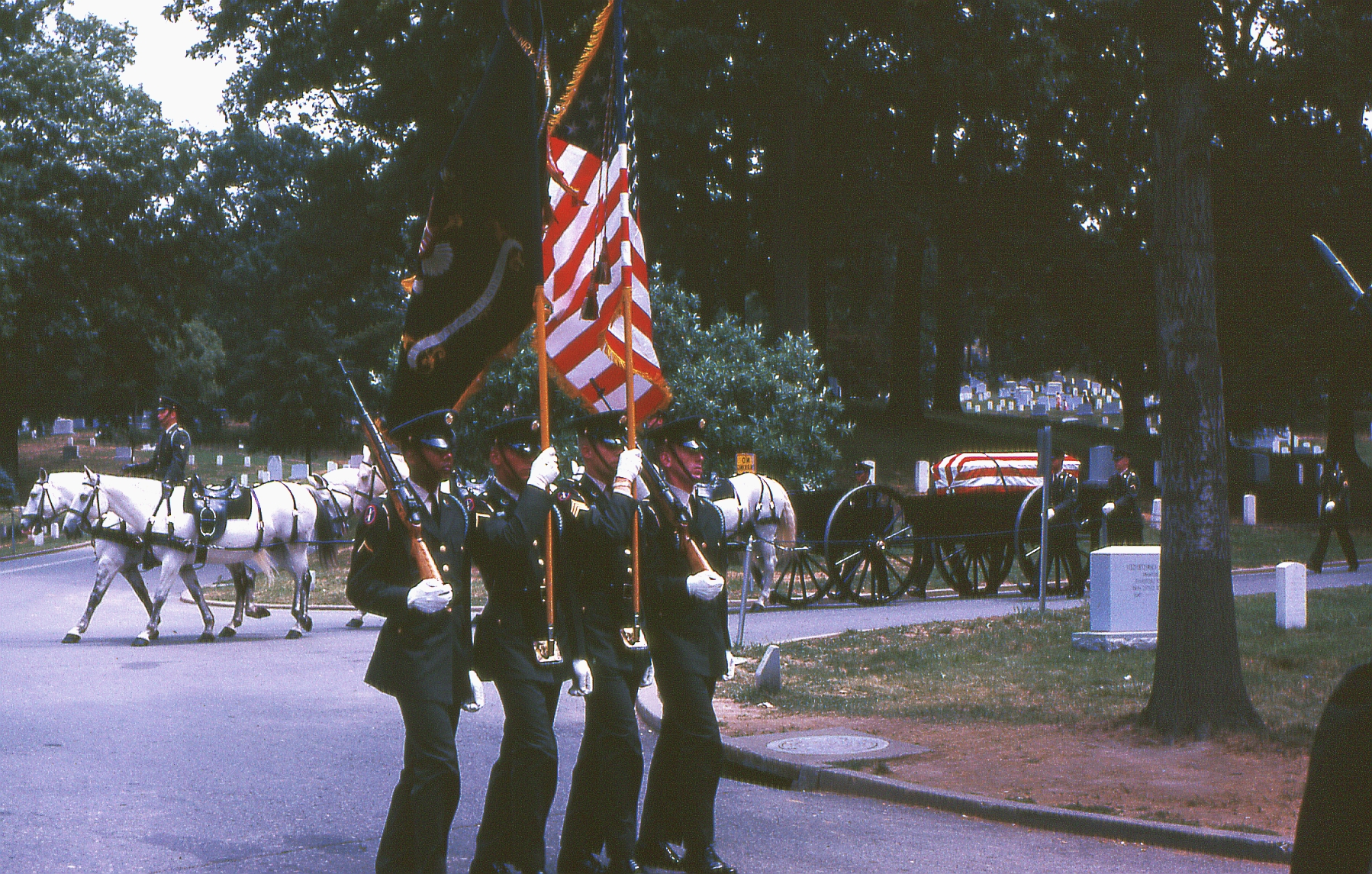
Military funeral procession in Arlington National Cemetery, July 1967

Part 553 (Army National Military Cemeteries) of Title 32 of the Code of Federal Regulations (CFR) establishes regulations for the cemetery, including eligibility for interment (ground burial) and inurnment. Due to limited space, the criteria for ground burial eligibility are more restrictive than at other national cemeteries, as well as more restrictive than for inurnment in the columbarium.

The persons specified below are eligible for ground burial in the cemetery, unless otherwise prohibited. The last period of active duty of former members of the armed forces must have ended honorably. Interment may be of casketed or cremated remains.

- Any active-duty member of the armed forces (except those members serving on active duty for training only)
- Any veteran who is retired and eligible for retirement pay from service in the armed forces, including service members retired from a reserve component who served a period of active duty (other than for training)
- Any former member of the armed forces separated honorably prior to 1 October 1949, for medical reasons and who was rated at 30% or greater disabled effective on the day of discharge
- Any former member of the armed forces who has been awarded one of the following decorations:
  - Medal of Honor
  - Distinguished Service Cross, Navy Cross, or Air Force Cross
  - Silver Star
  - Purple Heart
- Any former member of the armed forces who served on active duty (other than for training) and who held any of the following positions:
  - An elective office of the U.S. Government (such as a term in Congress)
  - Office of the Chief Justice of the United States or of an Associate Justice of the Supreme Court of the United States
  - An office listed, at the time the person held the position, in 5 USC 5312 or 5313 (Levels I and II of the Executive Schedule)
  - The chief of a mission who was at any time during his/her tenure classified in Class I under the provisions of Section 411, Act of 13 August 1946, 60 Stat. 1002, as amended (22 USC 866) or as listed in State Department memorandum dated 21 March 1988
- Any former prisoner of war who, while a prisoner of war, served honorably in the active military, naval, or air service, whose last period of military, naval or air service terminated honorably and who died on or after 30 November 1993
- The spouse, widow or widower, minor child, or permanently dependent child, and certain unmarried adult children of any of the above eligible veterans
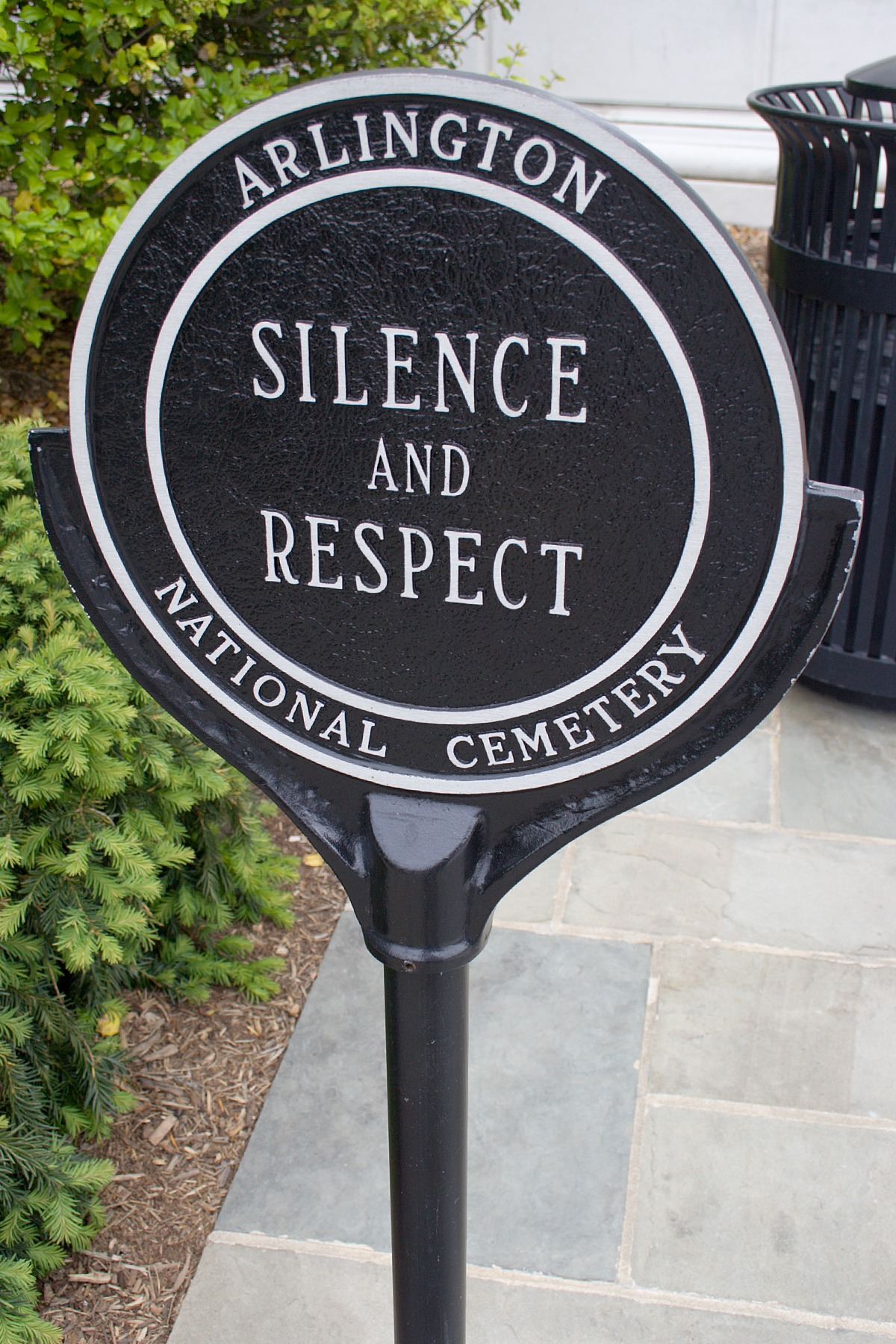
  Respectful silence is requested at Arlington National Cemetery.
- The widow or widower of:
  - a member of the armed forces who was lost or buried at sea or fell out of a plane or officially determined to be permanently absent with a status of either missing or missing in action
  - a member of the armed forces who is interred in a US military cemetery overseas that is maintained by the American Battle Monuments Commission
- The spouse, minor child, or permanently dependent child of any person already buried in Arlington National Cemetery
- The parents of a minor child, or permanently dependent child whose remains, based on the eligibility of a parent, are already buried at Arlington. A spouse divorced from the primary eligible, or widowed and remarried, is not eligible for interment
- Provided certain conditions are met, a former member of the armed forces may be buried in the same grave with a close relative who is already buried and is the primary eligible

=== Inurnment criteria for columbarium ===
Due at least partly to the lack of space at the cemetery for ground burial, standards for inurnment (burial of cremated remains) in the columbarium are currently much less restrictive than for ground burial at the cemetery. In general, any former member of the armed forces who served on active duty (other than for training) and whose last service terminated honorably is eligible for inurnment. Eligibility for inurnment is described fully in 32 C.F.R. § 553.15a.

=== Prohibitions against interment or memorialization ===
Congress has from time to time created prohibited categories of persons who, even if otherwise eligible for burial, lose that eligibility. One such prohibition is against certain persons who are convicted of committing certain state or federal capital crimes, as defined in 38 U.S. Code § 2411. Capital crime is a specifically defined term in the statute, and for state offenses can include offenses that are eligible for a life sentence (with or without parole). The reasoning for this provision originally was to prevent Timothy McVeigh from being eligible for burial at Arlington National Cemetery, but it has since been amended to bar others.

== Notable burials ==
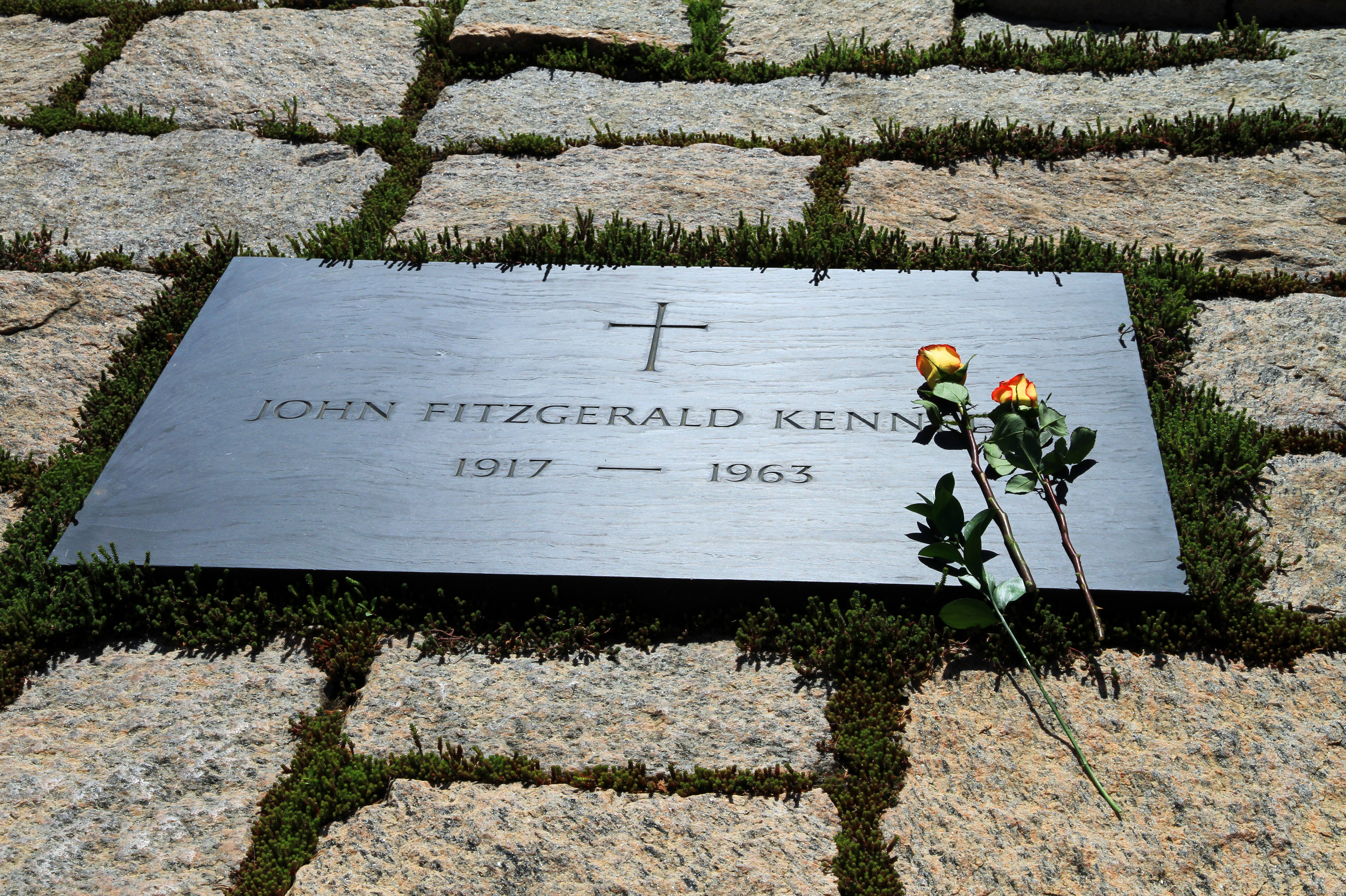
The grave marker of President John F. Kennedy

The first soldier to be buried in Arlington was Private William Henry Christman of Pennsylvania on 13 May 1864. There are 396 Medal of Honor recipients buried in Arlington National Cemetery as of 2016.

Three state funerals have been held at Arlington: those of Presidents William Howard Taft and John F. Kennedy, as well as General of the Armies John J. Pershing. Whether or not they were wartime service members, U.S. presidents are eligible to be buried at Arlington, since they oversaw the armed forces as commanders-in-chief.

Among the most frequently visited sites in the cemetery is the grave of President John F. Kennedy and Jacqueline Kennedy, who is buried nearby along with their son Patrick and their stillborn daughter Arabella. Kennedy's remains were interred there on 14 March 1967, a reinterment from his original Arlington burial site, some 20 feet (6.1 m) away, where he was buried in November 1963. The grave is marked with an "eternal flame". The remains of his brothers, Senator Robert F. Kennedy and Senator Edward M. "Ted" Kennedy along with Robert's wife Ethel Kennedy, are buried nearby. The latter two graves are marked with simple crosses and footstones. On 1 December 1971, Robert Kennedy's body was re-interred 100 feet (30 m) from its original June 1968 burial site.

Military figures from all backgrounds and walks of life are buried in Arlington National Cemetery. Among many African American veterans is General Benjamin O. Davis, Jr., commander of the World War II Tuskegee Airmen and the first Black brigadier general of the United States Air Force. American veterans with Spanish and Latin American roots are also laid to rest at Arlington. They include Hispanic Americans such as Rear Admiral Henry Gabriel Sanchez of the U.S. Navy, who commanded air squadrons during World War II. Women memorialized at Arlington National Cemetery span many decades of U.S. military history, from Anna Etheridge Hooks, a Civil War Army nurse awarded the Kearny Cross; to Master Sergeant Catherine Murray who enlisted in the Marine Corps Women's Reserve after the attack on Pearl Harbor; to Gulf War pilot Major Marie Therese Rossi, the first female Army commander to engage in active combat.

The Secretary of Commerce, Ron Brown, was buried at Arlington after he and 34 others died in the crash of a CT-43 in Croatia in 1996.

Two of the astronauts who were killed on 27 January 1967, by a flash fire inside the Apollo 1 command module, Gus Grissom and Roger Chaffee, are buried at the cemetery. John Glenn, the first American to orbit Earth and a longtime U.S. Senator from Ohio, was buried at the cemetery in April 2017.

British diplomat and Field Marshal Sir John Dill was buried at the cemetery when he died in Washington D.C. during World War II. The equestrian statue on Dill's grave is one of only two such statues at the cemetery; the other is Major General Philip Kearny's.

Lauri Törni, known for having served in the Finnish army during the Winter War, the German Waffen-SS during World War II, and the US Army during the Vietnam War is buried at Arlington. He died while he was a Captain and was promoted to Major posthumously on 16 December 1965. He is the only former member of the Waffen-SS to be interred here.

Richard McKinley, who died during the SL-1 reactor explosion in 1961, is buried at Arlington. His body is so radioactive it is in a special lead-lined casket.

== Visitor requirements ==
In 2016, the cemetery announced policies and procedures that limit visitor access to the cemetery's grounds, some of which were thought to possibly create delays for visitors.

=== Bicycle use ===
Pursuant to the Department of the Army final rule established in 2016, the cemetery's bicycle policy states bicycling presents a potential safety hazard, and is only allowed on its grounds with a family pass.

=== Security procedures ===
In September 2016, acting superintendent of the cemetery Patrick Hallinan announced that the cemetery was increasing security measures for its visitors. In addition to random identification checks and other security measures already in place, the cemetery would require pedestrians to enter at set access points: the main entrance on Memorial Avenue, the Ord and Weitzel gate, and the Old Post Chapel gate at Joint Base Myer-Henderson Hall. Before entering the cemetery through its main entrance, all pedestrians are now screened through the cemetery's Welcome Center. All vehicle access requires presenting valid, government-issued photo identification, such as a driver's license or passport, when entering the cemetery. Vehicles are also subject to random inspections. Hallinan stated that these processes could result in delays when entering the cemetery.

== See also ==
- List of national cemeteries
- List of burial places of presidents and vice presidents of the United States
- List of burial places of justices of the Supreme Court of the United States
- McKee Grave
- Theodore Wint Grave
- Donald Trump Arlington National Cemetery incident
- United States Department of Veterans Affairs emblems for headstones and markers
- United States Soldiers' and Airmen's Home National Cemetery, the other cemetery administered by the United States Department of the Army
