= Braille flag =

Tactile graphic representing the United States flag

The Braille flag is a fully tactile graphic accompanied with a user key that aides the blind in denoting the orientation, and colors of the American flag's stripes, stars and blue field. It also contains the Pledge of Allegiance in raised print and grades one and two Braille. It was created by Randolph Cabral, president of the Kansas Braille Transcription Institute, in Wichita, Kansas, to honor his dad a WWII veteran that lost his sight.

The Braille flag was endorsed by the Blinded Veterans Association during its 61st Annual Convention in Buffalo, New York, in 2006.

Congressman Todd Tiahrt of Kansas, along with 16 others, co-sponsored a bill asking the 110th Congress to place the Braille flag as a monument to Americas' blinded veterans, blind service members, and other blind Americans at the Arlington National Cemetery. H.R. 4169 passed the House on 14 Feb 2008.
