= Christopher Columbus Quincentenary coins =

Series of commemorative coins

The Christopher Columbus Quincentenary commemorative coins are a series of commemorative coins which were issued by the United States Mint in 1992 for the Columbus Quincentenary.

== Legislation ==
The Christopher Columbus Quincentenary Coin Act (Pub. L. 102–281) authorized the production of three coins, a clad half dollar, a silver dollar, and a gold half eagle, to commemorate the 500th anniversary of Christopher Columbus' discovery of America. The act allowed the coins to be struck in both proof and uncirculated finishes. The coins were first released on August 28, 1992.

== Designs ==
=== Half Dollar ===
The obverse of the Christopher Columbus Quincentennary half dollar, designed by T. James Ferrell, features a full-body image of Christopher Columbus at landfall, arms outstretched, with his disembarking crew and a small boat behind him to his right, and a ship in the background to his left. The reverse, also designed by Ferrell, portrays Columbus' ships the Niña, Pinta, and Santa María.

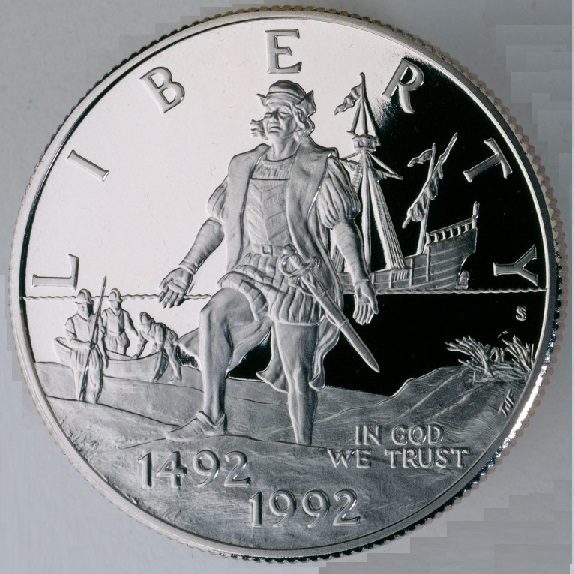
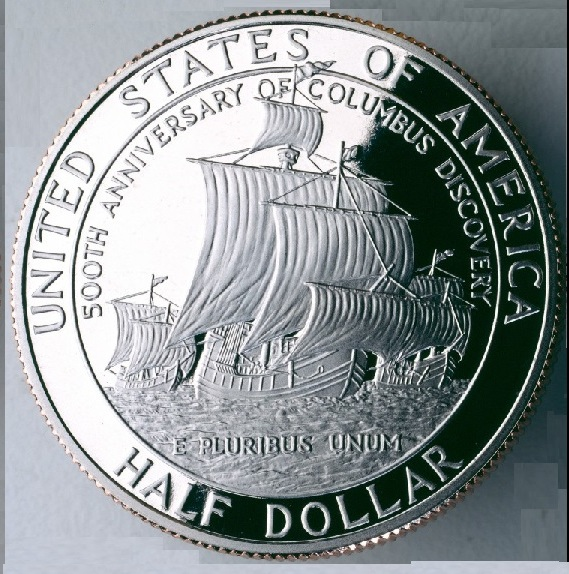
Obverse (left) and reverse (right) of the half dollar

=== Dollar ===
The obverse of the Christopher Columbus Quincentennary dollar, designed by John Mercanti, features a full-body image of Christopher Columbus holding a banner in his right hand, a scroll in his left hand, and standing next to a globe atop a pedestal to his left. The reverse, designed by Thomas D. Rogers, features an image of the left half of the Santa Maria and the right half the U.S. Space Shuttle Discovery, along with the Earth and a star to the upper right of the shuttle.

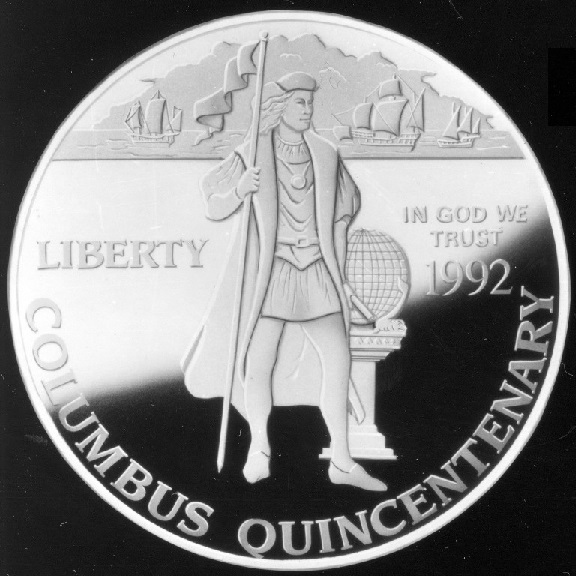
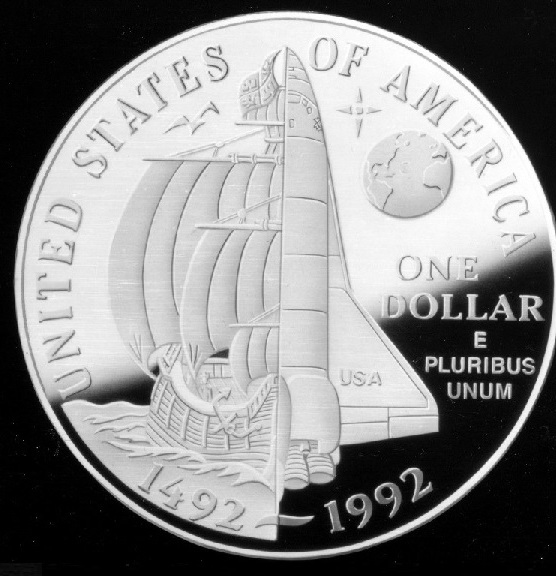
Obverse (left) and reverse (right) of the dollar

=== Half eagle ===
The obverse of the Christopher Columbus Quincentennary half eagle, designed by T. James Ferrell, shows Columbus facing a map of the Americas. The reverse, designed by Thomas D. Rogers, features the crest of the Admiral of the Oceans, an honor that was bestowed upon Columbus, and a map overlapping the Old World with the date 1492.

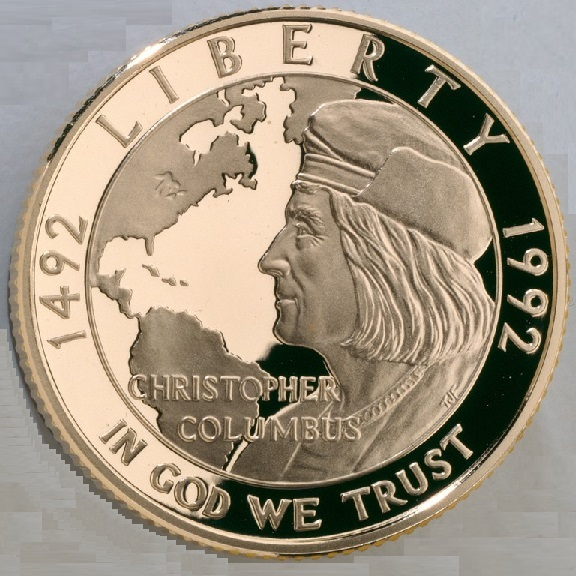

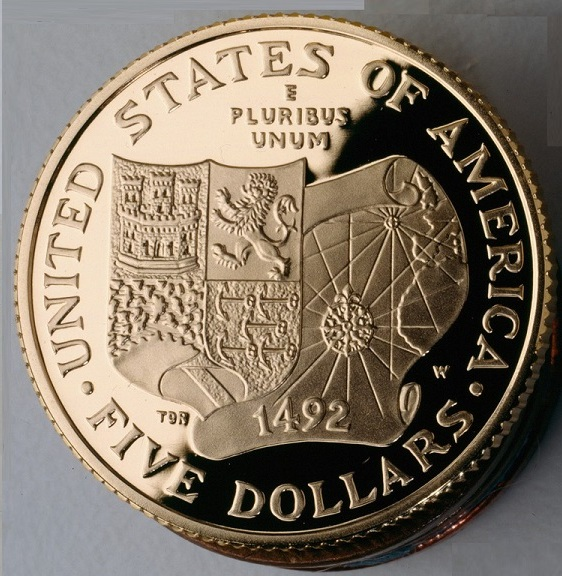

Obverse (left) and reverse (right) of the half eagle

== Specifications ==
Half Dollar

- Display Box Color: Dark Green
- Edge: Reeded
- Weight: 11.34 grams
- Diameter: 30.61 millimeters; 1.205 inches
- Composition: 92% Copper, 8% Nickel
- Maximum Mintage: 6,000,000

Dollar

- Display Box Color: Dark Green
- Edge: Reeded
- Weight: 26.730 grams; 0.8594 troy ounce
- Diameter: 38.10 millimeters; 1.50 inches
- Composition: 90% Silver, 10% Copper
- Maximum Mintage: 4,000,000

Half Eagle

- Display Box Color: Dark Green
- Edge: Reeded
- Weight: 8.359 grams; 0.2687 troy ounce
- Diameter: 21.59 millimeters; 0.850 inch
- Composition: 90% Gold, 6% Silver, 4% Copper
- Maximum Mintage: 500,000

== See also ==
- United States commemorative coins
- List of United States commemorative coins and medals (1990s)
- Columbian half dollar
