= Smithsonian Institution 150th Anniversary commemorative coins =

1996 series of United States Mint coins

The Smithsonian Institution 150th Anniversary commemorative coins are a series of commemorative coins which were issued by the United States Mint in 1996.

== Legislation ==
The Smithsonian Institution Sesquicentennial Commemorative Coin Act of 1995 (Pub. L. 104–96 (text) (PDF)) authorized the production of a silver dollar and a gold half eagle. Congress authorized the coins to commemorate the 150th anniversary of the founding of the Smithsonian Institution in 1846. The act allowed the coins to be struck in both proof and uncirculated finishes. The coins were released August 5, 1996.

== Designs ==
=== Dollar ===
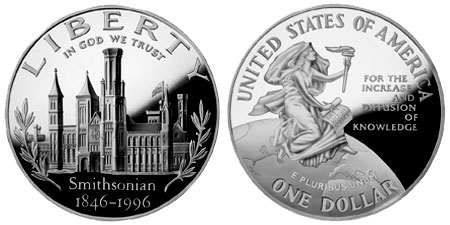
Smithsonian 150th Anniversary silver dollar obverse (left) and reverse (right)

The obverse of the Smithsonian Institution 150th Anniversary commemorative dollar, designed by Thomas D. Rogers, features an image of the first Smithsonian Institution building (known as the "Castle"), laurel leaves, and the dual date "1846-1996". The reverse of the coin, designed by John Mercanti, features a design of an allegorical figure carrying the torch of knowledge and sitting atop the world. This figure holds a scroll inscribed with the words, "art, history, and science," and "For the increase and diffusion of knowledge."

=== Half eagle ===
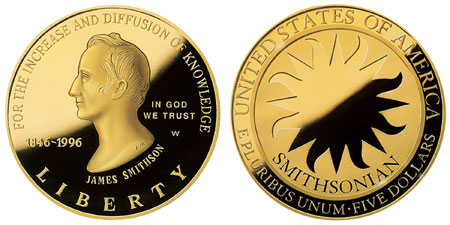
Smithsonian 150th Anniversary gold half eagle obverse (left) and reverse (right)

The obverse of the Smithsonian Institution 150th Anniversary commemorative half eagle, designed by Alfred Maletsky, features a classical bust of James Smithson with the double date "1846-1996". The reverse of the coin, designed by T. James Ferrell, features a design of the Smithsonian's sunburst logo and the word "Smithsonian".

== Specifications ==
Dollar

- Display Box Color: Dark Blue
- Edge: Reeded
- Weight: 26.730 grams; 0.8594 troy ounce
- Diameter: 38.10 millimeters; 1.50 inches
- Composition: 90% Silver, 10% Copper

Half Eagle

- Display Box Color: Dark Blue
- Edge: Reeded
- Weight: 8.359 grams; 0.2687 troy ounce
- Diameter: 21.59 millimeters; 0.850 inch
- Composition: 90% Gold, 3.6% Silver, 6.4% Copper

== See also ==
- United States commemorative coins
- List of United States commemorative coins and medals (1990s)
