= World War II 50th Anniversary commemorative coins =

1993 series of American coins

The World War II 50th Anniversary commemorative coins are a series of commemorative coins which were issued by the United States Mint in 1993.

== Legislation ==
The World War II 50th Anniversary Commemorative Coins Act (Pub. L. 102–414) authorized the production of three coins, a clad half dollar, a silver dollar, and a gold half eagle. Congress authorized the coins to commemorate the 50th anniversary of the United States’ involvement in World War II. The act allowed the coins to be struck in both proof and uncirculated finishes. Released on May 28, 1993, the coins feature the dual date “1991-1995”, which represents the 50th anniversary of American involvement in the war from 1941 to 1945.

== Designs ==
=== Half Dollar ===
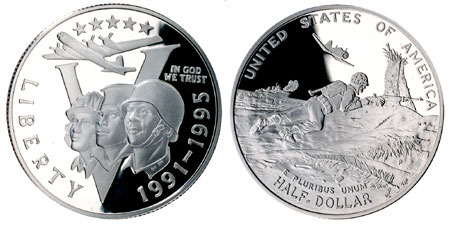
World War II 50th Anniversary half dollar obverse (left) and reverse (right)

The obverse of the World War II 50th Anniversary commemorative half dollar, designed by George Klauba, features the faces of three U.S. service personnel superimposed upon the "V" for victory symbol at center, beneath a B-17 bomber with five stars above the bomber at the top. The reverse of the coin, designed by Bill J. Leftwich, features an American serviceman on the beach of a Pacific island while a landing craft, a ship, and a fighter plane appear in the background.

=== Dollar ===
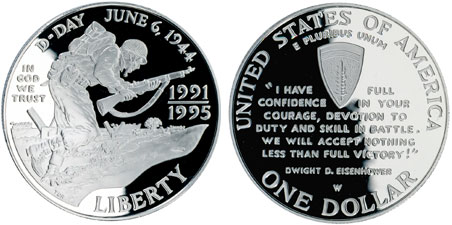
World War II 50th Anniversary silver dollar obverse (left) and reverse (right)

The obverse of the World War II 50th Anniversary commemorative dollar, designed by Thomas D. Rogers, features an American soldier advancing on the beach at Normandy and other servicemen in the trenches. The reverse of the coin, also designed by Rogers, features the shoulder sleeve insignia of Supreme Headquarters Allied Expeditionary Force (SHAEF) and a quote from General Eisenhower's D-Day message to the troops.

=== Half eagle ===
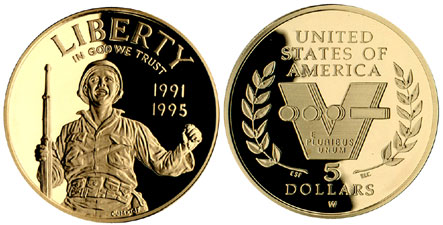
World War II 50 Anniversary gold half eagle obverse (left) and reverse (right)

The obverse of the World War II 50th Anniversary half eagle, designed by Charles J. Madsen, features an American serviceman with his rifle and arm raised celebrating victory. The reverse of the coin, designed by Edward Southworth Fisher, features "V" for victory at the center of the coin, with the Morse code cryptic for the letter "V" superimposed along laurel leaves.

== Specifications ==
Half Dollar

- Display Box Color: Dark Blue
- Edge: Reeded
- Weight: 11.340 grams
- Diameter: 30.61 millimeters; 1.205 inches
- Composition: 92% copper; 8% nickel (Cupronickel)

Dollar

- Display Box Color: Dark Blue
- Edge: Reeded
- Weight: 26.730 grams; 0.8594 troy ounce
- Diameter: 38.10 millimeters; 1.50 inches
- Composition: 90% Silver, 10% Copper

Half Eagle

- Display Box Color: Dark Blue
- Edge: Reeded
- Weight: 8.359 grams; 0.2687 troy ounce
- Diameter: 21.59 millimeters; 0.850 inch
- Composition: 90% Gold, 3.6% Silver, 6.4% Copper

== See also ==
- United States commemorative coins
- List of United States commemorative coins and medals (1990s)
