= List of United States commemorative coins (1990s) =

== 1990 ==
=== Non-circulating coins ===
Face value	Coin	Obverse design	Reverse design	Composition	Mintage	Available	Obverse	Reverse
$1	Eisenhower Centennial dollar	2 profiles of Eisenhower	Eisenhower's house near Gettysburg, PA, now part of Eisenhower Nat'l Historic Site	Ag 90%, Cu 10%	Authorized: 4,000,000 (max) Uncirculated: 241,669 W Proof: 1,144,461 P	1990		

== 1991 ==
=== Non-circulating coins ===
Face value	Coin	Obverse design	Reverse design	Composition	Mintage	Available	Obverse	Reverse
50¢	Mount Rushmore Anniversary half dollar	Mount Rushmore	American bison	Cu 92%, Ni 8%	Authorized: 2,500,000 (max) Uncirculated: 172,754 D Proof: 753,257 S	1991		
$1	Mount Rushmore Anniversary dollar	Mount Rushmore	Great Seal of the United States and United States map	Ag 90%, Cu 10%	Authorized: 2,500,000 (max) Uncirculated: 133,139 P Proof: 738,419 S	1991		
$5	Mount Rushmore Anniversary half eagle	Eagle flying over Mount Rushmore	The words "Mount Rushmore National Memorial"	Au 90%, Ag 6%, Cu 4%	Authorized: 500,000 (max) Uncirculated: 31,959 W Proof: 111,991 W	1991		
$1	Korean War Memorial dollar	Soldier	Map of Korea and a bald eagle	Ag 90%, Cu 10%	Authorized: 1,000,000 (max) Uncirculated: 213,049 D Proof: 618,488 P	1991		
$1	USO 50th Anniversary dollar	USO pennant and the words "50th Anniversary"	Eagle on top of a globe	Ag 90%, Cu 10%	Authorized: 1,000,000 (max) Uncirculated: 124,958 D Proof: 321,275 S	1991		

== 1992 ==
=== Non-circulating coins ===
Face value	Coin	Obverse design	Reverse design	Composition	Mintage	Available	Obverse	Reverse
50¢	1992 Summer Olympics half dollar	Gymnast	"Citius, Altius, Fortius," the Olympic torch and a branch	Cu 92%, Ni 8%	Authorized: 6,000,000 (max) Uncirculated: 161,607 P Proof: 519,645 S	1992		
$1	1992 Summer Olympics dollar	Pitcher	Olympic rings, two olive branches, shield, and "USA"	Ag 90%, Cu 10%	Authorized: 4,000,000 (max) Uncirculated: 187,552 D Proof: 504,505 S	1992		
$5	1992 Summer Olympics half eagle	Sprinter	Olympic rings and the Great Seal of the United States	Au 90%, Ag 6%, Cu 4%	Authorized: 500,000 (max) Uncirculated: 27,732 W Proof: 77,313 W	1992		
$1	White House Bicentennial dollar	The White House	Bust of James Hoban	Ag 90%, Cu 10%	Authorized: 500,000 (max) Uncirculated: 123,803 D Proof: 375,851 W	1992		
50¢	Christopher Columbus Quincentenary half dollar	Christopher Columbus landing on the New World	Christopher Columbus and the Niña, Pinta, and Santa María	Cu 92%, Ni 8%	Authorized: 1,000,000 (max) Uncirculated: 135,702 D Proof: 390,154 S	1992 – 1993		
$1	Christopher Columbus Quincentenary dollar	Christopher Columbus, a globe, and ships	Half of a ship and half of the U.S. Space Shuttle Discovery	Ag 90%, Cu 10%	Authorized: 4,000,000 (max) Uncirculated: 106,949 D Proof: 385,241 P	1992 – 1993		
$5	Christopher Columbus Quincentenary half eagle	Christopher Columbus facing a map of the Americas	Coat of arms of Christopher Columbus	Au 90%, Ag 6%, Cu 4%	Authorized: 500,000 (max) Uncirculated: 24,329 W Proof: 79,730 W	1992 – 1993		

== 1993 ==
=== Non-circulating coins ===
Face value	Coin	Obverse design	Reverse design	Composition	Mintage	Available	Obverse	Reverse
50¢	Bill of Rights half dollar	James Madison and Montpelier.	The Statue of Liberty's torch	Ag 90%, Cu 10%	Authorized: 1,000,000 (max) Uncirculated: 193,346 W Proof: 586,315 S	1993		
$1	Bill of Rights dollar	James Madison	Montpelier	Ag 90%, Cu 10%	Authorized: 900,000 (max) Uncirculated: 98,383 D Proof: 534,001 S	1993		
$5	Bill of Rights half eagle	James Madison	Madison quote, an eagle, torch, and laurel branch	Au 90%, Ag 6%, Cu 4%	Authorized: 300,000 (max) Uncirculated: 22,266 W Proof: 78,561 W	1993		
50¢	World War II 50th Anniversary half dollar (dated 1991–1995)	Three soldiers and a V for victory	Battle scene	Cu 92%, Ni 8%	Authorized: 2,000,000 (max) Uncirculated: 197,072 P Proof: 317,396 P	1993		
$1	World War II 50th Anniversary dollar (dated 1991–1995)	U.S. soldier on Normandy	Shoulder sleeve insignia of Supreme Headquarters Allied Expeditionary Force with Eisenhower quote	Ag 90%, Cu 10%	Authorized: 1,000,000 (max) Uncirculated: 94,708 D Proof: 342,041 W	1993		
$5	World War II 50th Anniversary half eagle (dated 1991–1995)	U.S. soldier	A V for victory, a quote by James Madison, an eagle, torch, and laurel branch	Au 90%, Ag 6%, Cu 4%	Authorized: 300,000 (max) Uncirculated: 23,089 W Proof: 65,461 W	1993		

== 1994 ==
=== Non-circulating coins ===
Face value	Coin	Obverse design	Reverse design	Composition	Mintage	Available	Obverse	Reverse
50¢	1994 World Cup half dollar	Soccer Player	1994 World Cup Logo	Cu 92%, Ni 8%	Authorized: 5,000,000 (max) Uncirculated: 168,208 D Proof: 609,354 P	1994		
$1	1994 World Cup dollar	Competing Soccer Players	1994 World Cup Logo	Ag 90%, Cu 10%	Authorized: 5,000,000 (max) Uncirculated: 81,698 D Proof: 576,978 S	1994		
$5	1994 World Cup half eagle	World Cup Trophy	1994 World Cup logo	Au 90%, Ag 6%, Cu 4%	Authorized: 750,000 (max) Uncirculated: 22,464 W Proof: 89,619 W	1994		
$1	Thomas Jefferson 250th Anniversary dollar (dated 1993)	Thomas Jefferson	Monticello	Ag 90%, Cu 10%	Authorized: 600,000 (max) Uncirculated: 266,927 P Proof: 332,891 S	1994		
$1	Vietnam War Memorial dollar	Outstretched hand touching a name on the Vietnam Veterans Memorial	Three medals awarded during the Vietnam War	Ag 90%, Cu 10%	Authorized: 500,000 (max) Uncirculated: 57,317 W Proof: 226,262 P	1994		
$1	Prisoners of War dollar	A chained eagle breaks free through a ring to represent "Freedom"	Proposed design for the National Prisoner of War Museum	Ag 90%, Cu 10%	Authorized: 500,000 (max) Uncirculated: 54,790 W Proof: 220,100 P	1994		
$1	Women in Military Service for America Memorial dollar	Servicewomen representing the five branches of the United States military	Approved design of the Women In Military Service for America Memorial	Ag 90%, Cu 10%	Authorized: 500,000 (max) Uncirculated: 53,054 W Proof: 213,201 P	1994		
$1	U.S. Capitol Bicentennial dollar	View of the Capitol dome	An eagle, a shield, and American flags	Ag 90%, Cu 10%	Authorized: 500,000 (max) Uncirculated: 68,352 D Proof: 279,416 S	1994		

== 1995 ==
=== Non-circulating coins ===
Face value	Coin	Obverse design	Reverse design	Composition	Mintage	Available	Obverse	Reverse
50¢	Civil War Battlefield half dollar	Civil War drummer boy	Battlefield scene; inscription “Enriching Our Future By Preserving Our Past”	Cu 92%, Ni 8%	Authorized: 2,000,000 (max) Uncirculated: 119,520 S Proof: 330,099 S	1995		
$1	Civil War Battlefield dollar	Infantryman raising a canteen to the lips of a wounded foe	Quotation from Joshua Chamberlain: "In great deeds something abides. On great fields something stays. Forms change and pass, bodies disappear, but spirits linger to consecrate ground for the visionplace of souls."	Ag 90%, Cu 10%	Authorized: 1,000,000 (max) Uncirculated: 45,866 P Proof: 330,002 S	1995		
$5	Civil War Battlefield half eagle	Civil War bugler on horseback	Bald eagle	Au 90%, Ag 6%, Cu 4%	Authorized: 300,000 (max) Uncirculated: 12,735 W Proof: 55,246 W	1995		
50¢	Centennial Olympics half dollar (Basketball)	Men's basketball	The Atlanta Committee for the Olympic Games mark superimposed over a globe	Cu 92%, Ni 8%	Authorized: 2,000,000 (max) Uncirculated: 171,001 S Proof: 169,655 S	1995		
50¢	Centennial Olympics half dollar (Baseball)	Men's baseball	The Atlanta Committee for the Olympic Games mark superimposed over a globe	Cu 92%, Ni 8%	Authorized: 2,000,000 (max) Uncirculated: 164,605 S Proof: 118,087 S	1995		
$1	Centennial Olympics dollar (Paralympic Running)	Blind tethered runner and the Paralympic mark	Clasped hands symbolizing brotherhood and team spirit	Ag 90%, Cu 10%	Authorized: 750,000 (max) Uncirculated: 28,649 D Proof: 138,337 P	1995		
$1	Centennial Olympics dollar (Gymnastics)	Men's gymnastics	Clasped hands symbolizing brotherhood and team spirit	Ag 90%, Cu 10%	Authorized: 750,000 (max) Uncirculated: 42,497 D Proof: 182,676 P	1995		
$1	Centennial Olympics dollar (Cycling)	Men cycling	Clasped hands symbolizing brotherhood and team spirit	Ag 90%, Cu 10%	Authorized: 750,000 (max) Uncirculated: 19,662 D Proof: 118,795 P	1995		
$1	Centennial Olympics dollar (Track & Field)	Men's track and field competition	Clasped hands symbolizing brotherhood and team spirit	Ag 90%, Cu 10%	Authorized: 750,000 (max) Uncirculated 24,796 D Proof: 136,935 P	1995		
$5	Centennial Olympics half eagle (Torch Runner)	Runner carrying torch	Side view of a bald eagle with a banner in its beak	Au 90%, Ag 6%, Cu 4%	Authorized: 175,000 (max) Uncirculated: 14,675 W Proof: 57,442 W	1995		
$5	Centennial Olympics half eagle (Stadium)	Picture of the Olympic Stadium	Side view of a bald eagle with a banner in its beak	Au 90%, Ag 6%, Cu 4%	Authorized: 175,000 (max) Uncirculated: 10,579 W Proof: 43,124 W	1995		
$1	Special Olympics World Games dollar	Special Olympics founder Eunice Kennedy Shriver	Special Olympics Medal, a rose and quote	Ag 90%, Cu 10%	Authorized: 800,000 (max) Uncirculated: 89,301 W Proof: 351,764 P	1995		

== 1996 ==
=== Non-circulating coins ===
Face value	Coin	Obverse design	Reverse design	Composition	Mintage	Available	Obverse	Reverse
50¢	Centennial Olympics half dollar (Swimming)	Male Swimmer	Mark of The Atlanta Committee for the Olympic with a torch and flame	Cu 92%, Ni 8%	Authorized: 3,000,000 (max) Uncirculated: 49,533 S Proof: 77,962 S	1996		
50¢	Centennial Olympics half dollar (Soccer)	Women playing soccer	Atlanta Committee for the Olympic Games mark with a flame, torch, rings, a Greek column and a "100" to mark the centennial of the Modern Olympic Games	Cu 92%, Ni 8%	Authorized: 3,000,000 (max) Uncirculated: 52,836 S Proof: 122,412 S	1996		
$1	Centennial Olympics dollar (Paralympic Track & Field)	Wheelchair athlete competing in a track and field event	The Atlanta Committee for the Olympic Games mark with a torch and flame	Ag 90%, Cu 10%	Authorized: 1,000,000 (max) Uncirculated: 14,497 D Proof: 84,280 P	1996		
$1	Centennial Olympics dollar (Tennis)	Women playing tennis	The Atlanta Committee for the Olympic Games mark with a torch and flame	Ag 90%, Cu 10%	Authorized: 1,000,000 (max) Uncirculated: 15,983 D Proof: 92,016 P	1996		
$1	Centennial Olympics dollar (Rowing)	Men rowing	The Atlanta Committee for the Olympic Games mark with a torch and flame	Ag 90%, Cu 10%	Authorized: 1,000,000 (max) Uncirculated: 16,258 D Proof: 151,890 P	1996		
$1	Centennial Olympics dollar (High Jump)	Athlete performing the "Fosbury Flop"	The Atlanta Committee for the Olympic Games mark with a torch and flame	Ag 90%, Cu 10%	Authorized: 1,000,000 (max) Uncirculated: 15,697 D Proof: 124,502 P	1996		
$5	Centennial Olympics half eagle (Cauldron)	The lighting of the Olympic flame	The Atlanta Committee for the Olympic Games mark, encompassed by laurel leaves	Au 90%, Ag 6%, Cu 4%	Authorized: 300,000 (max) Uncirculated: 9,210 W Proof: 38,555 W	1996		
$5	Centennial Olympics half eagle (Flag Bearer)	Athlete bearing a flag and a following crowd	The Atlanta Committee for the Olympic Games mark, encompassed by laurel leaves	Au 90%, Ag 6%, Cu 4%	Authorized: 300,000 (max) Uncirculated: 9,174 W Proof: 32,886 W	1996		
$1	National Community Service dollar	Standing figure of Liberty	Inscribed with "Service for America" at center, encircled by a laurel wreath	Ag 90%, Cu 10%	Authorized: 500,000 (max) Uncirculated: 23,500 S Proof: 101,543 S	1996		
$1	Smithsonian 150th Anniversary dollar	Smithsonian Institution, known as the Castle	Allegorical figure atop the world	Ag 90%, Cu 10%	Authorized: 650,000 (max) Uncirculated: 31,230 D Proof: 129,152 P	1996		
$5	Smithsonian 150th Anniversary half eagle	Picture of James Smithson	Smithsonian starburst symbol	Au 90%, Ag 6%, Cu 4%	Authorized: 100,000 (max) Uncirculated: 9,068 W Proof: 29,474 W	1996		

== 1997 ==
=== Non-circulating coins ===
Face value	Coin	Obverse design	Reverse design	Composition	Mintage	Available	Obverse	Reverse
$1	Botanic Garden dollar	Multi-arched French façade of the U.S. Botanic Garden	A rose garland around a rose	Ag 90%, Cu 10%	Authorized: 500,000 (max) Uncirculated: 57,272 P Proof: 264,528 P	1997		
$1	Jackie Robinson dollar	Jackie Robinson stealing home plate during the 1955 World Series	50th anniversary logo of the Jackie Robinson Foundation surrounded by "Rookie of the Year 1947," and "Hall of Fame 1962"	Ag 90%, Cu 10%	Authorized: 200,000 (max) Uncirculated: 30,007 S Proof: 110,495 S	1997 – 1998		
$5	Jackie Robinson half eagle	Portrait of Jackie Robinson	Inscription "Legacy of Courage"	Au 90%, Ag 6%, Cu 4%	Authorized: 100,000 (max) Uncirculated: 5,202 W Proof: 24,072 W	August 16, 1997 – August 16, 1998		
$1	Law Enforcement Officers Memorial dollar	United States Park Police officers Robert Chelsey and Kelcy Stefansson making a rubbing of a fellow officer's name	Emblem of the National Law Enforcement Memorial	Ag 90%, Cu 10%	Authorized: 500,000 (max) Uncirculated: 28,575 P Proof: 110,428 P	September 19, 1997 – December 15, 1998		
$5	Franklin Delano Roosevelt half eagle	Portrait of President Roosevelt	Presidential seal displayed at FDR's 1933 inaugural	Au 90%, Ag 6%, Cu 4%	Authorized: 100,000 (max) Uncirculated: 11,894 W Proof: 29,474 W	1997		

== 1998 ==
=== Non-circulating coins ===
Face value	Coin	Obverse design	Reverse design	Composition	Mintage	Available	Obverse	Reverse
$1	Robert F. Kennedy dollar	Robert F. Kennedy	Seal of the United States Department of Justice and Seal of the United States Senate	Ag 90%, Cu 10%	Authorized: 500,000 (max) Uncirculated: 106,422 S Proof: 99,020 S	January 2, 1998 – December 31, 1998		
$1	Black Revolutionary War Patriots dollar	Crispus Attucks	Proposed Black Patriots Memorial	Ag 90%, Cu 10%	Authorized: 500,000 (max) Uncirculated: 37,210 S Proof: 75,070 S	February 13, 1998 – December 31, 1998		

== 1999 ==
=== Non-circulating coins ===
Face value	Coin	Obverse design	Reverse design	Composition	Mintage	Available	Obverse	Reverse
$1	Dolley Madison dollar	Dolley Madison	Image of Montpelier	Ag 90%, Cu 10%	Authorized: 500,000 (max) Uncirculated: 22,948 P Proof: 158,247 P	January 1, 1998 – December 31, 1998		
$1	Yellowstone National Park dollar	Old Faithful spouting with the park's tree-lined landscape in the background	American buffalo on the plains with the brilliant Sun rising above the mountains in the background	Ag 90%, Cu 10%	Authorized: 500,000 (max) Uncirculated: 23,614 P Proof: 128,646 P	July 16, 1999 – July 15, 2000		
$5	George Washington half eagle	Profile of George Washington	Traditional view of a bald eagle	Au 90%, Ag 6%, Cu 4%	Authorizing: 100,000 (max) Uncirculated: 22,511W Proof: 41,693 W	May 1, 1999 – November 31, 1999		

=== Circulating coins ===
Face value	Coin	Obverse design	Reverse design	Mintage	Obverse	Reverse
25¢	Delaware quarter	George Washington	Caesar Rodney on horseback Captions: "The First State", "Caesar Rodney"	Circulation: 373,400,000 P 401,424,000 D Proof: 3,713,359 S (clad); 804,565 S (silver)		
25¢	Pennsylvania quarter	George Washington	Commonwealth statue, state outline, keystone Caption: "Virtue, Liberty, Independence"	Circulation: 349,000,000 P 358,332,000 D Proof: 3,713,359 S (clad); 804,565 S (silver)		
25¢	New Jersey quarter	George Washington	Washington Crossing the Delaware, which includes George Washington (standing) and James Monroe (holding the flag) Caption: "Crossroads of the Revolution"	Circulation: 363,200,000 P 299,028,000 D Proof: 3,713,359 S (clad); 804,565 S (silver)		
25¢	Georgia quarter	George Washington	Peach, live oak (state tree) sprigs, state outline Banner with text: "Wisdom, Justice, Moderation" (the state motto)	Circulation: 451,188,000 P 488,744,000 D Proof: 3,713,359 S (clad); 804,565 S (silver)		
25¢	Connecticut quarter	George Washington	Charter Oak Caption: "The Charter Oak"	Circulation: 688,744,000 P 657,880,000 D Proof: 3,713,359 S (clad); 804,565 S (silver)		

== Notes ==
^1 This is a non-circulating variety of a circulating coin.
