= Women in Military Service for America Memorial silver dollar =

- United States
- Value: 1 United States dollar
- Mass: 26.73 g (0.859 troy oz)
- Diameter: 38.1 mm (1.500 in)
- Years of minting: 1994
- Mint marks: Philadelphia Mint

Obverse
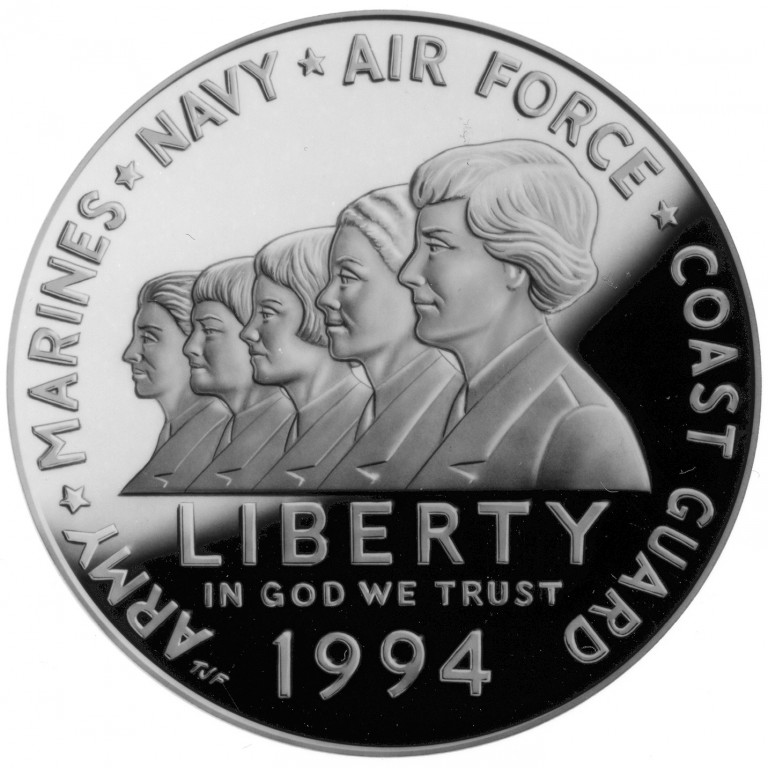
- Design: Profile of servicewomen representing the five branches of the United States Military
- Designer: T. James Ferrell

Reverse
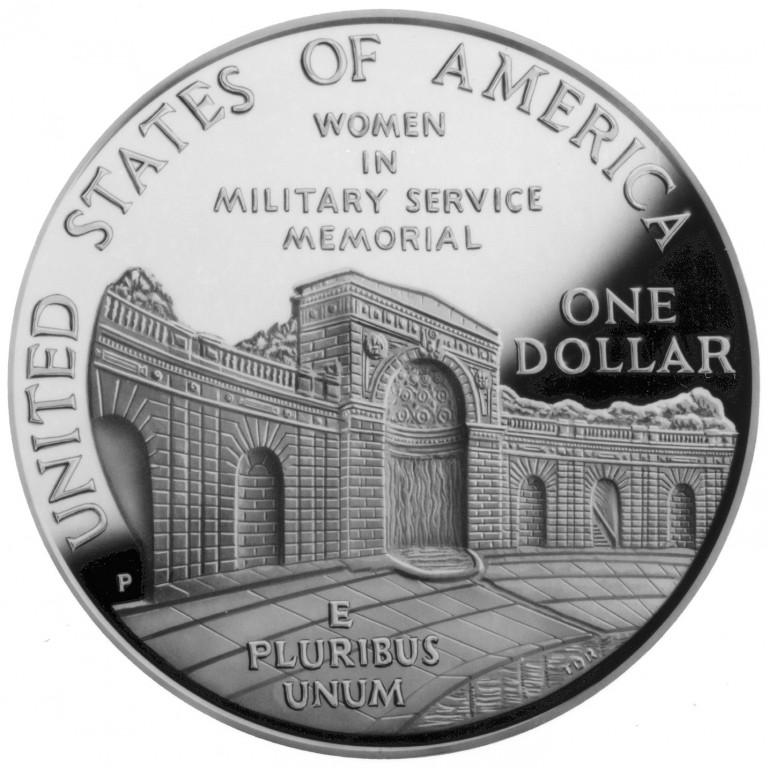
- Design: Approved design for the Women In Military Service for American Memorial.
- Designer: Thomas D. Rogers, Sr.

The Women in Military Service for America Memorial silver dollar is a commemorative dollar, related to the Women in Military Service for America Memorial, issued by the United States Mint in 1994. It was one of three coins in the 1994 Veterans Program, along with the Vietnam War Memorial and Prisoners of War silver dollar.

== Specifications ==
The following specifications are given by H.R. 3616.

- Weight: 26.73 grams (0.859 troy ounces)
- Diameter: 1.500 inches (38.1 mm)
- Composition: 90% Silver, 10% Copper

== See also ==
- United States commemorative coins
- List of United States commemorative coins and medals (1990s)
