= National Community Service silver dollar =

Commemorative silver US dollar

- United States
- Value: 1 U.S. dollar
- Mass: 26.73 g
- Diameter: 38.1 mm (1.500 in)
- Edge: Reeded
- Composition: 90% Ag, 10% Cu
- Years of minting: 1996
- Mintage: 23,500 Uncirculated 101,543 Proof
- Mint marks: S

Obverse
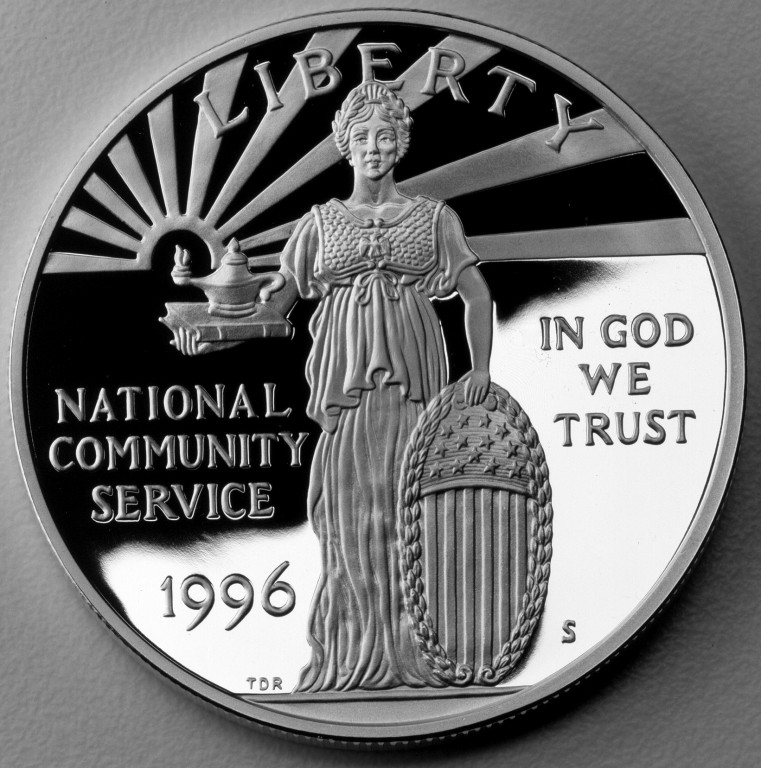
- Design: Standing figure of Liberty adapted from a 1905 Augustus Saint-Gaudens medal
- Designer: Thomas D. Rogers
- Design date: 1996

Reverse
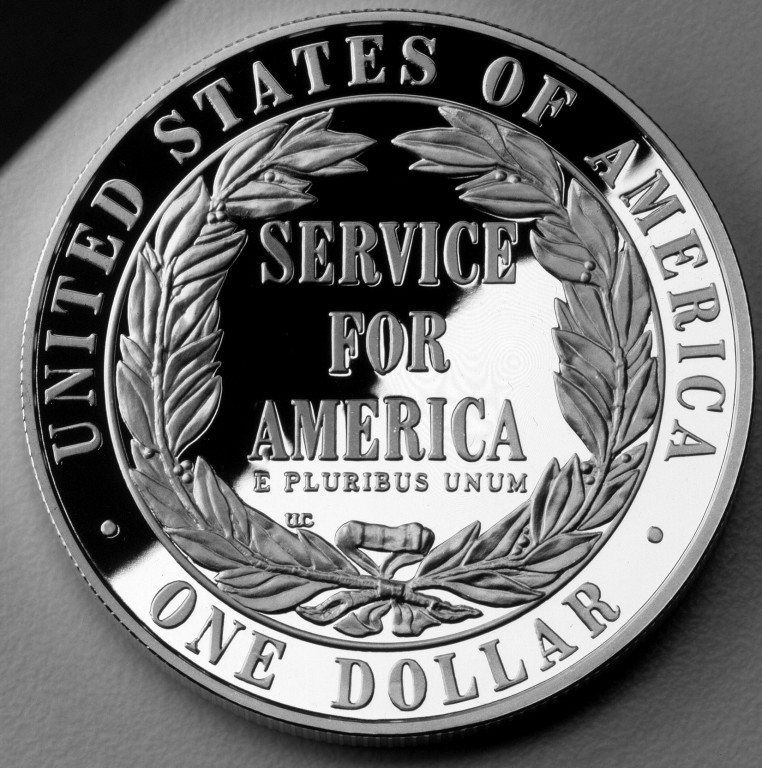
- Design: Inscribed with "Service for America" at center, encircled by a laurel wreath
- Designer: William C. Cousins
- Design date: 1996

The National Community Service silver dollar is a commemorative coin issued by the United States Mint in 1996. The coin commemorates Americans who devoted their time to community service. The coin received criticism from collectors at the time who viewed the increasing amount of commemorative coin issues as tiring, especially after the Centennial Olympics commemorative coins series.

== Legislation ==
Legislation for the coin was sponsored by Representative Joseph P. Kennedy of Massachusetts. The Riegle-Neal Interstate Banking and Branching Efficiency Act of 1994 (Pub. L. 103–328) included provisions for the minting the National Community Service dollar alongside several other commemorative coins. A maximum of 500,000 coins were authorized.

== Design ==
The obverse features a figure of Liberty with a shield holding a lamp emanating light, in a similar style to the reverse of the 1986 Statue of Liberty half dollar. Designer and sculptor Thomas D. Rogers adapted the design from a 1905 medal for the Women's Auxiliary of the Massachusetts Civil Service Reform Association created by Augustus Saint-Gaudens and Frances Grimes. The reverse design features a wreath inscribed with "Service for America". The designs were revealed on May 3, 1996 and were well-received by coin collectors.

== Production and release ==
The Mint produced 23,500 uncirculated coins and 101,543 proof coins.

== See also ==
- List of United States commemorative coins and medals (1990s)
- United States commemorative coins
