= Vietnam Veterans Memorial silver dollar =

1994 U.S. commemorative coin

Vietnam Veterans Memorial commemorative dollar
- United States
- Value: 1 U.S. dollar
- Mass: 26.73 g (0.859 troy oz)
- Diameter: 38.1 mm (1.500 in)
- Composition: 90% Ag; 10% Cu
- Years of minting: 1994
- Mintage: 57,290 Uncirculated 227,671 Proof
- Mint marks: Philadelphia Mint

Obverse
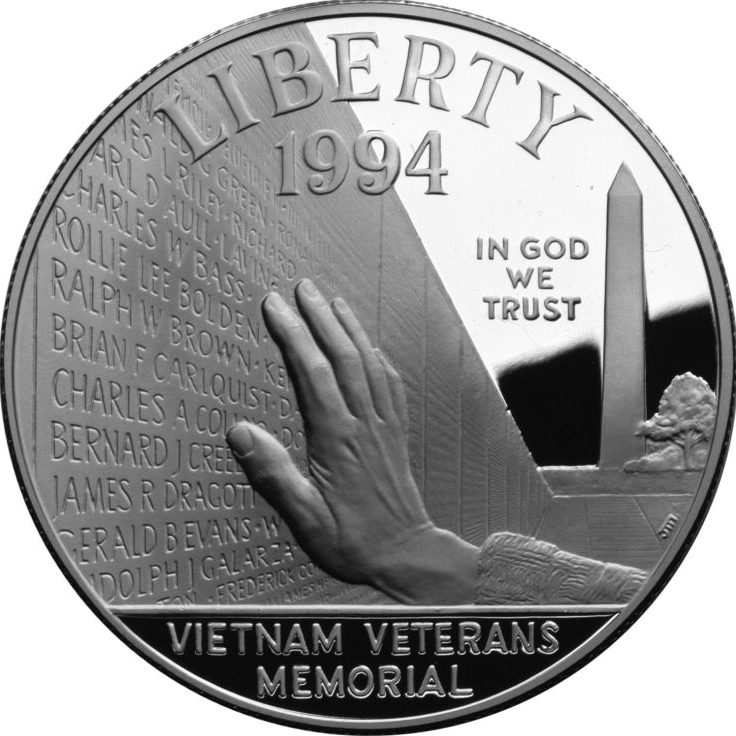
- Design: Outstretched hand touching a name on the Wall
- Designer: John Mercanti

Reverse
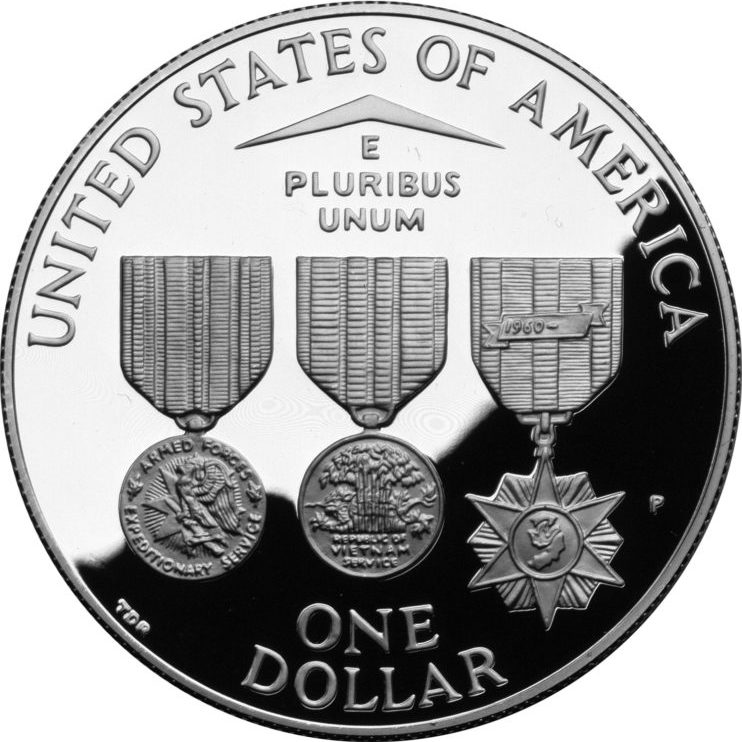
- Design: Three medals awarded during the war
- Designer: Thomas D. Rogers

The Vietnam Veterans Memorial silver dollar is a commemorative coin issued by the United States Mint in 1994. It was one of three coins in the 1994 Veterans Program, along with the Prisoners of War and Women in Military Service for America Memorial silver dollars.

== Legislation ==
The United States Veterans Commemorative Coin Act of 1993 (Pub. L. 103–186) authorized the production of a commemorative silver dollar to pay tribute to veterans of the Vietnam War and the Vietnam War Memorial in Washington, D.C. The act allowed the coins to be struck in both proof and uncirculated finishes. The coin was first released on July 29, 1994, the 10th anniversary of the dedication of the memorial.

== Design ==
The obverse of the Vietnam Veterans Memorial commemorative dollar, designed by John Mercanti, features a section of the Vietnam Veterans Memorial Wall, with an outstretched hand touching a name, and the Washington Monument and a tree in the background. The reverse, designed by Thomas D. Rogers, features three medals awarded during war.

== Production ==
The coins were minted at the Philadelphia Mint, where 57,290 uncirculated coins and 227,671 proof coins were struck.

== Specifications ==
The following specifications are given by H.R. 3616.

- Weight: 26.73 grams (0.859 troy ounces)
- Diameter: 1.500 inches (38.1 mm)
- Composition: 90% Silver, 10% Copper

The coin has reeded edges, and is distributed in a dark green display box.

== See also ==
- United States commemorative coins
- List of United States commemorative coins and medals (1990s)
