= Black Revolutionary War Patriots silver dollar =

- United States
- Value: $1
- Years of minting: 1998

Obverse
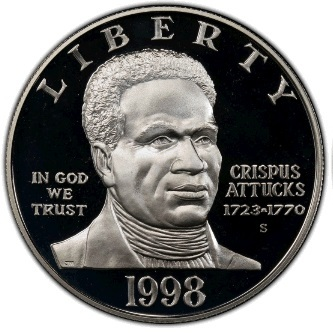

Reverse
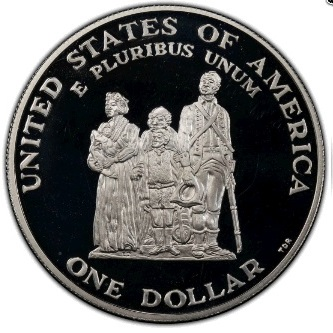

The Black Revolutionary War Patriots silver dollar is a commemorative dollar issued by the United States Mint in 1998.

The obverse of the coin features Crispus Attucks, a dockworker and freed slave who is generally considered to be the first man killed in the Boston Massacre.

== See also ==
- List of United States commemorative coins and medals (1990s)
- United States commemorative coins
