= White House Bicentennial silver dollar =

U.S. commemorative silver dollar

White House Bicentennial dollar
- United States
- Value: 1 U.S. Dollar
- Mass: 26.730 g
- Diameter: 38.1 mm (1.500 in)
- Thickness: 2.58 mm
- Edge: Reeded
- Composition: 90% Ag / 10% Cu
- Years of minting: 1992
- Mintage: 123,803 Uncirculated 375,849 Proof
- Mint marks: D for uncirculated pieces, W for proof pieces

Obverse
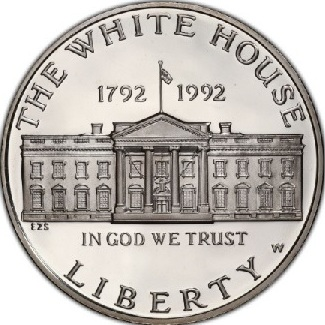
- Design date: 1992

Reverse
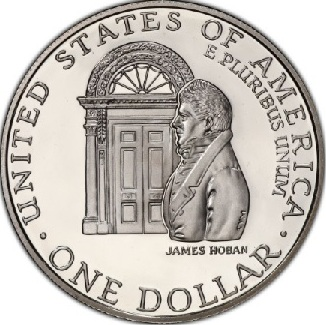
- Design date: 1992

The White House Bicentennial silver dollar is a commemorative silver dollar issued by the United States Mint in 1992.

== Legislation ==
The 1992 White House Commemorative Coin Act (Pub. L. 102–281) authorized the production of a silver dollar to commemorate the 200th anniversary of the laying of the White House cornerstone in 1792. The act allowed the coin to be struck in both proof and uncirculated finishes.

== Designs ==
The obverse design of the coin, designed by Edgar Z. Steever, IV, features the north portico of the White House. The reverse, designed by Chester Y. Martin, features a bust of James Hoban, the original architect of the White House, and the main entrance that he designed.

== See also ==
- List of United States commemorative coins and medals (1990s)
- United States commemorative coins
