= Columbus Quincentenary =

500th anniversary of Christopher Columbus' arrival in America

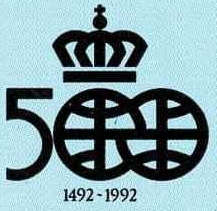
Official logo of the commemoration

The Columbus Quincentenary (1992) was the 500th anniversary of Christopher Columbus' 1492 arrival in America. Similar to Columbus Day, the annual celebration of Columbus' arrival, the quincentenary was viewed contentiously, as different cultures and peoples had different ways of understanding Columbus' role in history. Certain institutions sought to celebrate this anniversary in commemoration of Columbus' momentous colonial and imperial achievements. Spain's Universal Exposition of Seville (1992) was elaborately planned to highlight Columbus' work and the overall European Age of Discovery. Italy's International Exposition of Genoa (1992) was themed "Christopher Columbus, The Ship and the Sea." In 1984, the United States designated the Christopher Columbus Quincentenary Jubilee Commission to execute a commemoration in honor of Columbus. In total, over 20 countries, including several Latin American countries and Japan, had committees to plan quincentennial celebrations.

Alternatively, anti-celebration efforts emerged in the United States preceding the quincentenary. Indigenous Peoples' Day, a holiday honoring Native Americans and their presence in the Americas before 1492, gained traction in the United States leading up to the quincentenary and has since seen widespread adoption. This trend is also seen in Latin America regarding Columbus Day-like October 12 holidays.

The Columbus Quincentenary became a focal point for competing narratives on European exploration and indigenous rights abuses. Criticism of the celebration of the Columbus Quincentenary stems from the violent and oppressive treatment by European colonialists, including Columbus, towards indigenous peoples across the Americas. And thus, opposing efforts have focused on education surrounding the indigenous side of history. Following the quincentenary, new pedagogies prominently emerged that centered on listening to Native American perspectives on European colonization as well as thinking critically about the implications of Columbus' arrival in the Americas.

== Background ==
Christopher Columbus was an Italian explorer who led four trans-Atlantic voyages—1492, 1493, 1498, and 1502—from Spain. In his 1492 voyage, which was an attempt to find a direct ship route from Europe to Asia, Columbus stumbled across the Bahamas and became the first European explorer to find the Americas. By 1492, there were already millions of indigenous peoples inhabiting North and South America. For the Europeans, Columbus' arrival in the Americas began the Age of Discovery, where thousands of European-sponsored trans-Atlantic trips would be made to colonize the Americas and conduct trade.

On October 12, 1892, the 400th anniversary of Columbus' arrival, U.S. President Benjamin Harrison proclaimed a national celebration of American heritage that would be known as Columbus Day. Columbus' achievements in terms of expanding the Western world have since been formally commemorated through Columbus Day, the annual U.S. holiday that takes place on October 12 or, since 1971, the second Monday in October. European and Latin American countries have their own holidays to remember Columbus on October 12. More recently, Columbus Day celebrations have sparked controversy over Columbus' treatment of indigenous peoples in the Americas and the subsequent implications of European colonization for native populations. This has led to the emergence of counter-commemorative holidays to replace or coincide with Columbus Day in several countries.

== European celebration of Columbus ==
=== Universal Exposition of Seville ===
Between April 20 and October 12, 1992, Spain hosted an international exposition in Seville to celebrate Columbus' "discovery" of America. The final day of the celebration was intended to coincide with the Columbus Quincentenary. On La Cartuja island, next to the old city of Seville, a new city was built to represent the entire world. Attendees had the opportunity to navigate different parts of the globe staged within this city. This was intended to be commemorative of the idea that Columbus connected all parts of the world through his journeys overseas.

As an overarching theme, the exposition sought to celebrate the encounter of different cultures through human discovery, and Spain's intention was to landmark Seville as the center of this progress. Spain wanted to remind the world that Columbus launched his journeys from Spain. The exposition itself was a display of Spanish-nationalist pride for what the country believed was among the greatest contributions to mankind: sponsoring Columbus to expand the Western world.

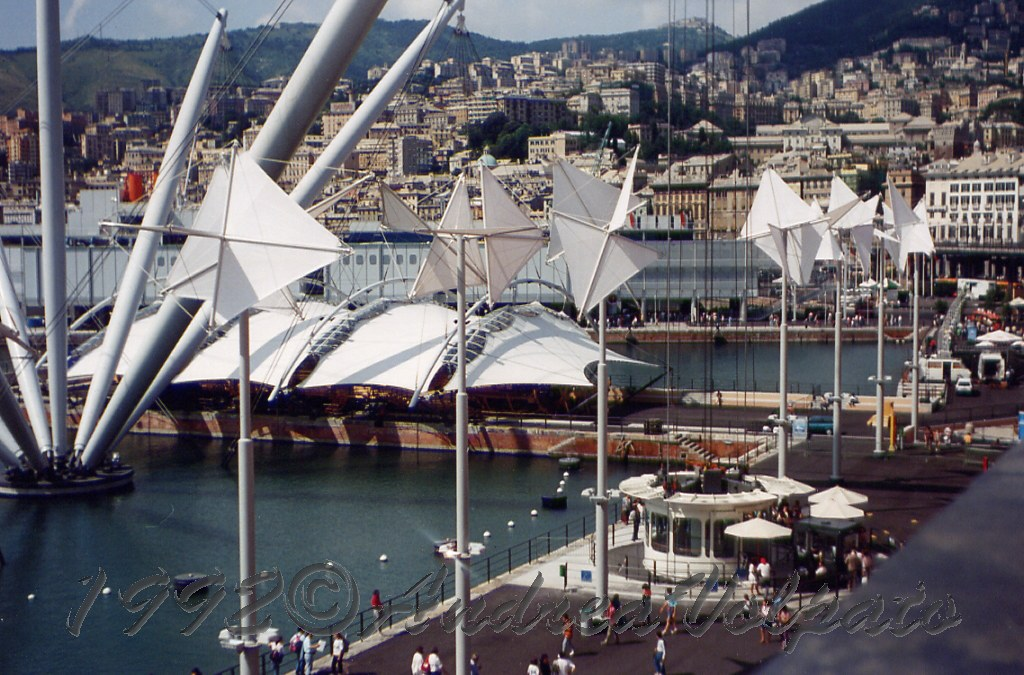
International Exposition of Genoa in Genoa, Italy (1992)

=== International Exposition of Genoa ===
Similar to Spain, Italy sought to commemorate the European arrival in the Americas through an international exposition. The fair was built on the ancient port of Genoa and lasted from May 15 to August 15, 1992. Less than one million attendees came to Genoa for the exposition, which was seen as a disappointment. The United States actively participated in the Genoa exposition along with dozens of other countries, and the U.S. pavilion was given its own location and seen as a "small jewel" of the fair. The elaborate display of U.S. involvement in the European Age of Discovery, which Italy sought to nationalize given the fact that Columbus was Italian, highlighted the strong relationship between the U.S. and Italy as well as the fact that both countries were proud of their involvement in the Columbus story.

=== Other events ===
Air France staged a special Concorde supersonic flight, dubbed Flight 1492, which circumnavigated the world in 32 hours and 49 minutes on 12–13 October 1992, starting and ending in Lisbon. This flight set a new world record for the fastest non-orbital circumnavigation of the Earth, a record which stood until Air France surpassed it with another special Concorde flight in 1995.

== North American celebration of Columbus ==
=== Christopher Columbus Quincentenary Jubilee Commission ===
The Christopher Columbus Quincentenary Jubilee Commission was established in 1984 under the Christopher Columbus Quincentenary Jubilee Act to execute a national commemoration of Columbus in 1992. The commission was to exist until 1993, and it operated on $2 million of seed money from the federal government and thousands of dollars from private donations and sponsorships. Despite its funding, the commission fell short on its expenses and could not conduct sufficient fundraising—in part due to the controversy surrounding the celebration of Columbus. In a 1987 report to Congress, the commission recognized that it would be more of a coordinator than a direct leader of the nationwide commemorative activities being planned for the quincentenary. Certain events, however, were directly organized by the commission, such as tour of Columbus replica ships—the Nina, Pinta, and Santa Maria—around 20 US cities.

The Jubilee Commission also became a center for Columbus opposition. Leading up to 1992, several Native American groups stressed their opposition by planning protests for quincentenary celebrations being planned by the Jubilee Commission. Additionally, Dave Warren, a Native American serving as an honorary member on the commission, stepped down from his role in 1990.

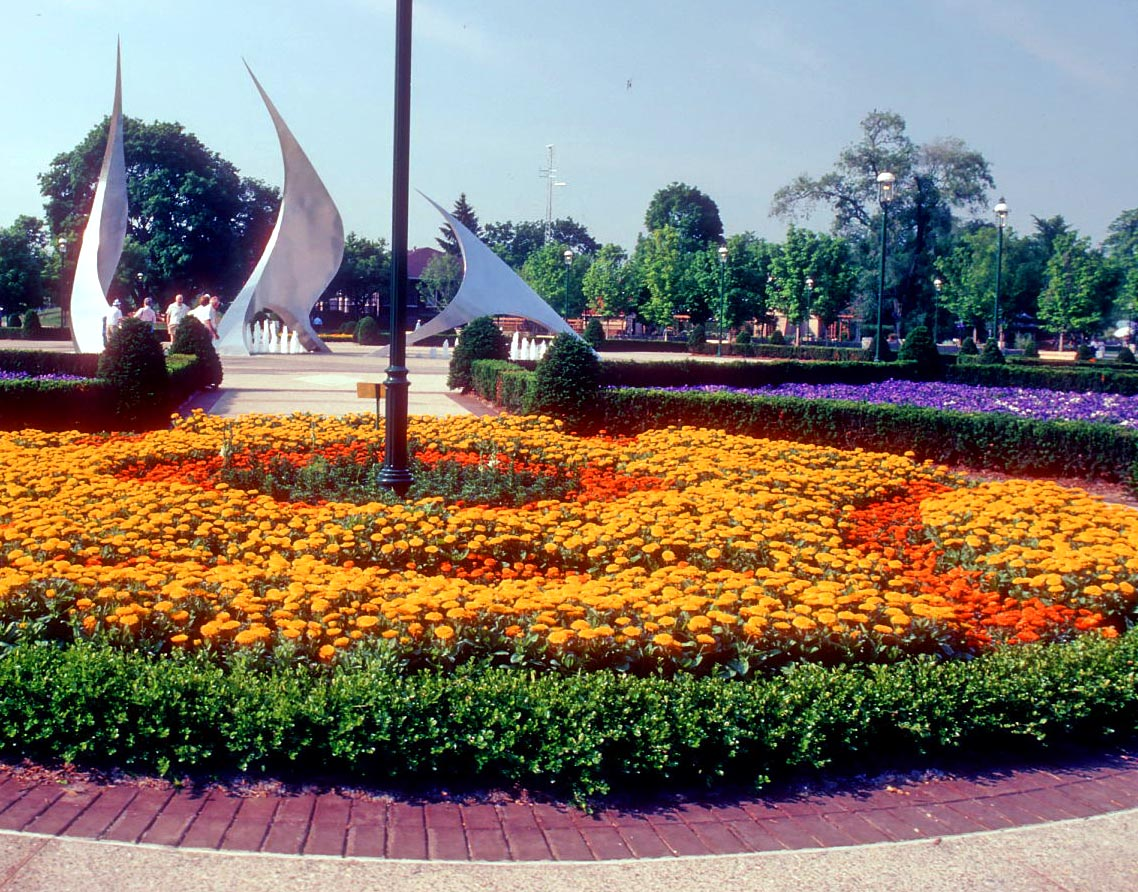
AmeriFlora exhibition in Columbus, Ohio (1992)

==== AmeriFlora ====
In 1989, the Christopher Columbus Quincentenary Jubilee Commission approved AmeriFlora '92, a global exhibition of horticulture, as a commemorative event for Columbus. The exhibition took place in Columbus, Ohio in 1992, cost around $100 million in production, and hosted 5.5 million attendees. However, attendance was significantly less than anticipated and AmeriFlora experienced a financial loss. Among other things, the event was hindered by a Native American boycott regarding the celebratory nature of the exposition.

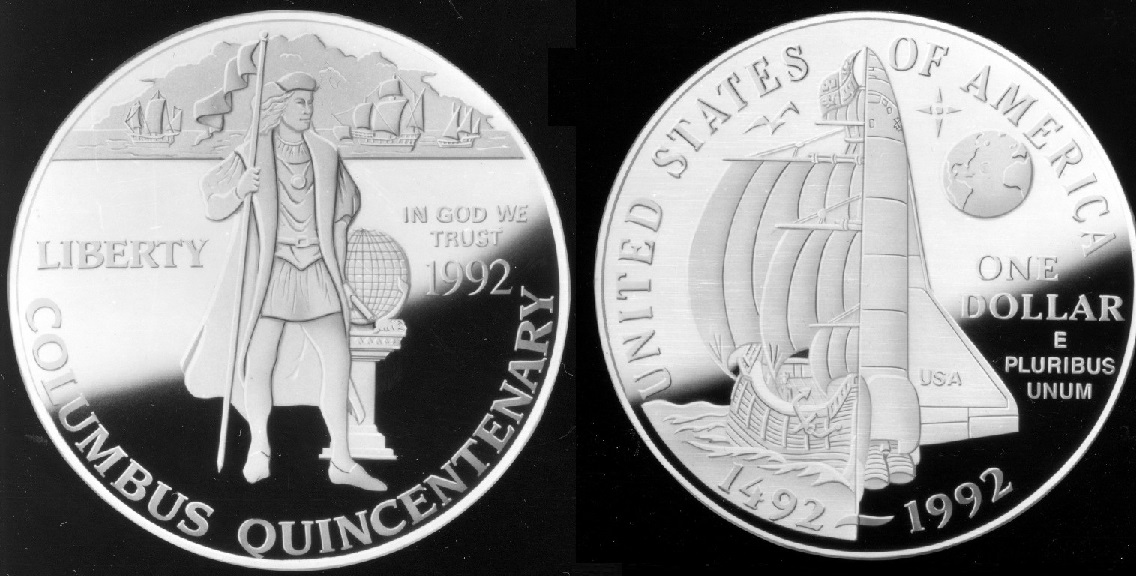
Columbus Quincentenary dollar coin issued by U.S. Mint (1992)

=== Christopher Columbus Quincentenary Dollar ===
Among other Christopher Columbus Quincentenary coins, on August 28, 1992, a Christopher Columbus Quincentenary dollar coin was issued by the United States Mint. The coin honored the achievements of Columbus, and the proceeds from its surcharges were given to the Christopher Columbus Fellowship Foundation in order to further its research. The Mint sold these coins only for a limited time as designated by Congress.

=== Public opinion ===
Six years after the Columbus Quincentenary, 1,511 Americans participated in a public opinion poll on Columbus. The researchers ultimately broke participants into five categories based on their attitude towards Columbus: heroic traditional Columbus, simple traditional Columbus, other Europeans, Indians already here, and villainous Columbus. The poll revealed that over 90% of participants fell into the "heroic traditional Columbus" (6.2%) and "simple traditional Columbus" (84.7%) categories. In other words, the vast majority of respondents saw Columbus as the discoverer of America (simple traditional), and some even viewed Columbus as a hero (heroic traditional). Alternatively, less than 10% of participants collectively believed that either Columbus was not a particularly unique European explorer (other Europeans, 3.3%), other people were present in America before Columbus' arrival (Indians already here, 2.2%), or Columbus was a terrorizer of Native Americans (villainous Columbus, 3.6%).

== North American opposition ==
=== Native Americans ===
Native Americans do not remember Columbus in a celebratory manner. In the years leading to 1992, the Native American community continuously denounced the celebration of the Columbus Quincentenary. Kirkpatrick Sale's 1990 publication of The Conquest of Paradise: Christopher Columbus and the Columbian Legacy spurred a high point in the opposition towards Columbus. This book was considered the first widespread anti-Columbus text and it highlighted the oppression and destruction caused by Columbus and Spanish colonialism. For Native Americans, the quincentenary was a critical time to highlight their history and promote goals of identity preservation and self-governance.

==== Public opinion ====
A survey of Native Americans conducted in 1989 revealed that the majority opposed a celebration of the Columbus Quincentenary and instead saw it as a learning opportunity for the general public. More specifically, 70% of respondents felt that the quincentenary represented five hundred years of Native resistance to colonization. 78% felt that educational activities were appropriate to celebrate the 500th anniversary, 19% instead favored legal actions against the United States, and 3% wanted public apologies by Western institutions. No respondents suggested that a commemoration of Columbus was appropriate for the quincentenary.

==== Indian Indigenous Survival Summit 1991 ====
In 1991, over 200 indigenous representatives from a variety of tribes in the United States and Canada gathered to discuss and plan a formal opposition to the Columbus Quincentenary celebrations. Among these participants were representatives of the Shoshone, Navajo, Hopi, Sioux, and Mixtec tribes. This opposition was centered around the fact the Columbus represents the oppression and persecution of Native Americans who had been living in America for hundreds of years prior to his arrival in 1492. Further, these activists believed that the United States federal government should be making reciprocity by offering displaced indigenous peoples more resources, including education and food.

==== Protests ====
On the day of the quincentenary, countless Native American-driven protests against the celebration of Columbus occurred in cities across the U.S. Certain demonstrations, such as at AmeriFlora, directly coincided with U.S.-sponsored quincentennial celebrations. In Washington, D.C., the Columbus Day Parade was cancelled as a result of Native Americans and their supporters promising to disrupt any celebration.

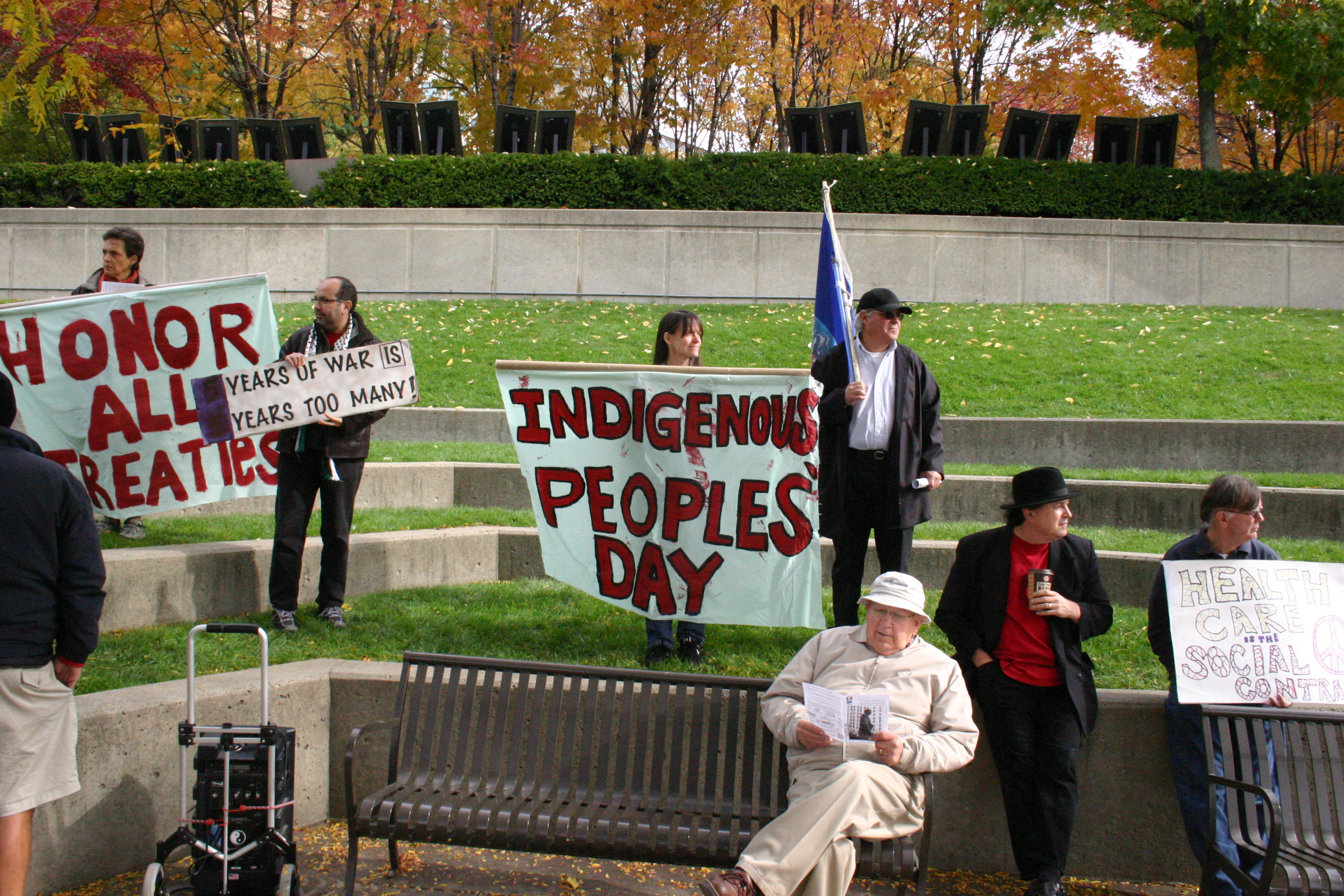
Advocacy for better treatment of Native Americans (2009)

=== Indigenous Peoples' Day ===
In 1990, South Dakota became the first state to rename Columbus Day as Native American Day. In 1992, the year of the Columbus Quincentenary, Berkeley, California became the first city to adopt Indigenous Peoples' Day, serving as a direct counter to the celebration of Columbus. This holiday has been widely adopted across cities and communities in the United States since then and continues to serve as opposition to the notion that Christopher Columbus discovered an uninhabited Americas. Today, more than 15 states as well as the District of Columbia observe some form of Indigenous People's Day, either in addition to or in lieu of Columbus Day.

== Latin American resistance ==
=== History of indigenous discrimination ===
The transnational movement for indigenous rights has made tremendous strides following the Columbus Quincentenary. Before the 1980s, with the goal of fostering greater cultural assimilation, Latin American policies discouraged indigenous identification. For example, the Constitution of Argentine sought to systematically assimilate and forget about its indigenous groups. And the Bolivian and Peruvian class-based policies effectively required their indigenous populations to identify as campesinos (peasant farmers). However, this trend has been significantly reversed in the last 30 years. In many instances, this change has come from the top, as "Constitutional reforms recognizing multicultural nations containing plural citizenries occurred in Guatemala, Nicaragua, Brazil, Colombia, Mexico, Paraguay, Ecuador, Argentina, Peru, and Venezuela."

=== Renaming holidays ===
Two years after the quincentenary, Costa Rica changed its Día de la Raza (Day of Race) holiday to Día del Encuentro de las Culturas (Day of the Encounter of Cultures) in order to celebrate cultural diversity rather than Columbus. A few years later, Chile followed suit, renaming its Aniversario del Descubrimiento de América (Anniversary of the Discovery of America) to Día del Descubrimiento de Dos Mundos (Day of the Discovery of Two Worlds). In 2002, Venezuela formally renamed its Día de la Raza to Día de la Resistencia Indígena (Day of Indigenous Resistance).

=== Protests ===
In Latin America, a tremendous amount of oppositional efforts and protests occurred leading up to the quincentenary as well as on the anniversary itself. The National Association of Salvadoran Indigenous (ANIS) gave a petition to the Legislative Assembly of El Salvador demanding a ban on any celebrations scheduled for the quincentenary, punishment for government officials who do celebrate the quincentenary, and the removal of Columbus from the national currency. On October 12, 1992, approximately 2,000 activists marched through San Jose, Costa Rica demanding respect for the country's indigenous population and favorable resolutions of native land disputes. In at least four Guatemalan cities, indigenous peoples protested the celebration of Columbus in addition to delivering a formal petition to the National Congress that called for better living conditions for indigenous communities in Guatemala. In Panama City, Panama around 3,000 indigenous rights activists protested the quincentenary celebrations and demanded the creation of a plurinational state.

=== Rigoberta Menchú ===
In 1992, the Nobel Peace Prize was awarded to Guatemalan human rights activist Rigoberta Menchú. Menchú, recognized for her impactful social justice work for indigenous peoples, was intentionally given this prize in 1992 to coincide with the Columbus Quincentenary. After being lobbied by various indigenous organizations, the Norwegian Nobel Committee that selects each year's winner chose to highlight that Columbus's arrival in America symbolizes oppression for indigenous peoples. The committee decided to bring an indigenous rights champion to the international stage at the same time the Western world was celebrating the European Age of Discovery.

== Shifting narratives ==
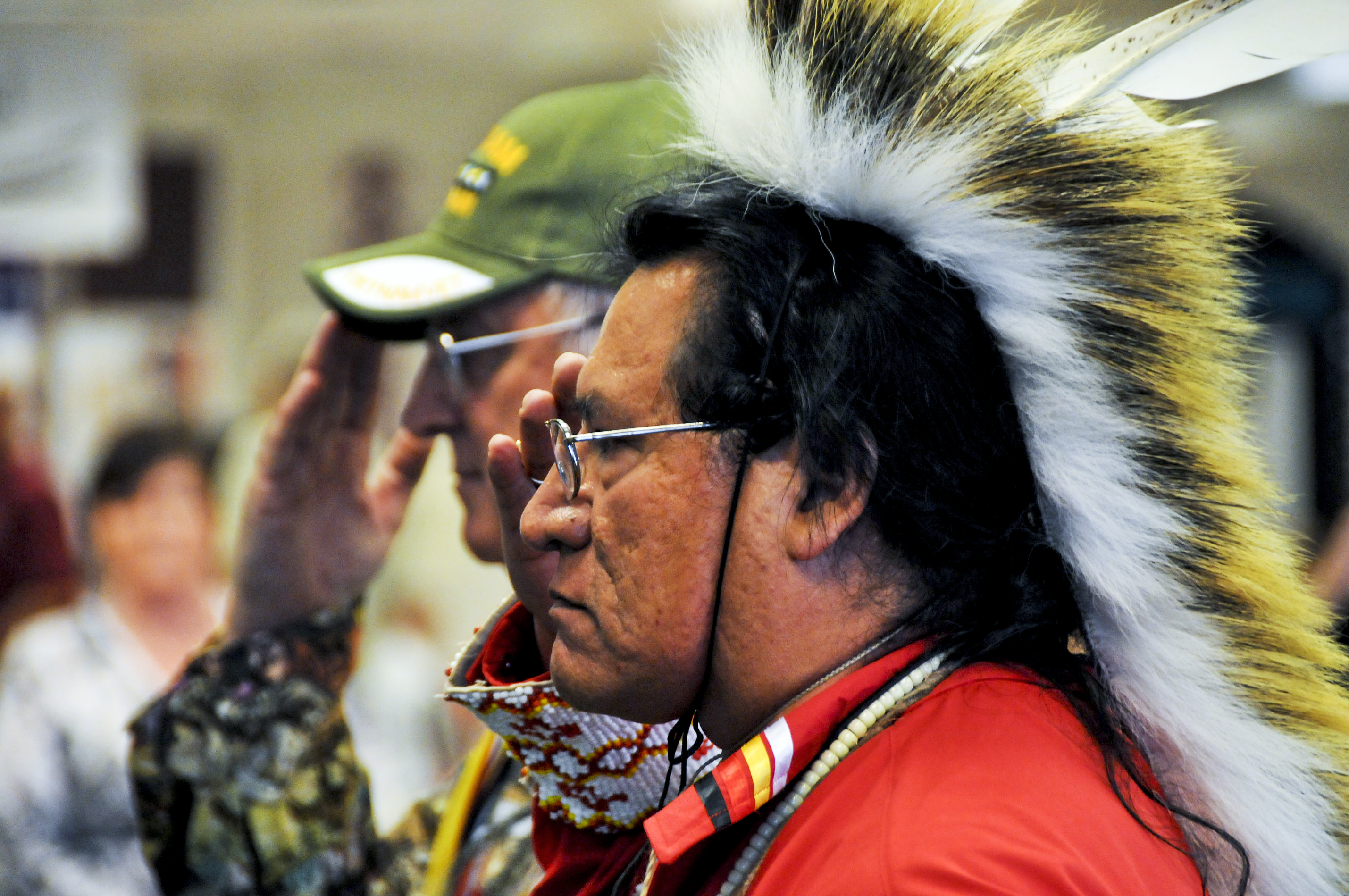
Native American Heritage Celebration in Fort Rucker, Alabama (2010)

The Columbus Quincentenary provided a unique opportunity to restudy European colonization and better understand its present-day implications. The clash between cultural conservatism and deep-rooted resistance on this anniversary called for a reexamination of the dominant pedagogy that teaches Columbus as a father of discovery and Western development. As the anniversary of Columbus was celebrated through exhibits, festivals, publications, and several other public outlets, it was critical to also consider the perspectives that viewed Columbus in a drastically different way.

The quincentenary has influenced the amount of media coverage and attention given to Native Americans in more recent years. As the world continues to develop economically, the important role of indigenous peoples as stewards of the land has become increasingly relevant, particularly in Western society. Indigenous territories have gotten geographically closer to developmental projects, and intrusion into these lands for economic purposes serves as a modern-day reminder of what colonization looked like a few hundred years ago. Periodicals around the time of the quincentenary identified four major issues surrounding the development of resources in the U.S. that involved conflicting interests with Native Americans. These conflicts included "salmon fish protection in the Columbia River, water and its use in Navajo and Hopi coal slurry transportation in Arizona, river diversion in northwestern New Mexico, and opposition to oil and gas exploration in Montana."

Increased awareness of Columbus' negative colonial consequences resulted in greater polarization of those perpetuating different narratives of American history. Following Sale's release of The Conquest of Paradise: Christopher Columbus and the Columbian Legacy, which united the anti-Columbus movement, cultural conservatives pushed harder to celebrate accomplishments of Columbus that greatly contributed to the European Age of Discovery. The Commission for 500 Years of Indigenous and Popular Resistance claims that this ideological campaign is driven by the idea that European colonization of the Americas was an encounter of different cultures, when in reality it was a harsh imposition of European culture.

=== Counter-commemorative pedagogy ===
The Columbus Quincentenary as a whole is regarded by many as a failure due to lack of public interest in actually attending celebrations to the extent that was anticipated and the numerous indigenous protests. The quincentenary is also considered a success for its strides in the anti-Columbus movement. More people began to look critically at what exactly Columbus brought to America in terms of his treatment towards natives.

The counter-commemorative pedagogy challenges and reinterprets dominant narratives pertaining to Columbus and greater European exploration. This way of teaching often suggests that the celebratory nature of Columbus anniversaries perpetuates supremacist logic that does not consider the experiences of a marginalized community to the same degree.

Commemorative practice has a significant visual element as images represent ways of remembering the past, and the images from Columbus' arrival overwhelmingly depict discovery and accomplishment. This is seen through famous artwork, such as John Vanderlyn's painting of the landing of Columbus, as well as institutionalized imagery, including a U.S. postage stamp from 1893 that uses Vanderlyn's artwork. In 1992, there was a shift towards commemorative images depicting the cruel European treatment of Native Americans during the colonialist period. In particular, paintings by William Snyder challenged the dominant narrative by showing explicit, gruesome acts of Europeans against Native Americans, such as lynchings.
