= Korean War Memorial silver dollar =

1991 U.S. commemorative coin

Korean War Memorial dollar
- United States
- Value: 1 U.S. Dollar
- Mass: 26.73 g
- Diameter: 38.1 mm
- Thickness: 2.58 mm
- Edge: Reeded
- Composition: 90% Ag; 10% Cu
- Years of minting: 1991
- Mintage: 213,049 Uncirculated 618,488 Proof
- Mint marks: D for uncirculated coins P for proof coins

Obverse
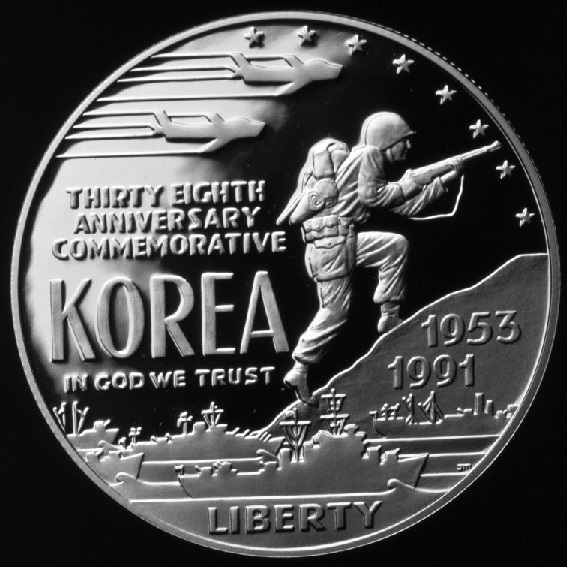
- Design: Soldier
- Designer: John Mercanti
- Design date: 1991

Reverse
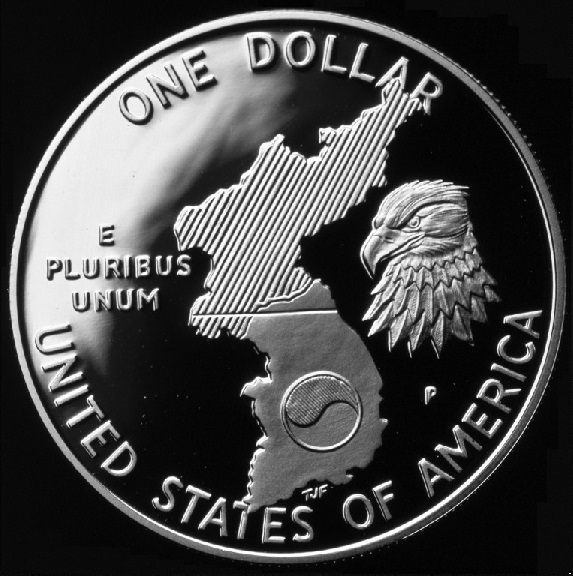
- Design: Map of Korea and a bald eagle
- Designer: T. James Ferrell
- Design date: 1991

The Korean War Memorial silver dollar is a commemorative silver dollar issued by the United States Mint in 1991. The coin commemorated the 38th anniversary of the end of the Korean War.

== Legislation ==
The Korean War Veterans Memorial Thirty-Eighth Anniversary Commemorative Coin Act (Pub. L. 101–495) authorized the production of a silver dollar to commemorate the 38th anniversary of the ending of the Korean War and in honor of those who served. The act allowed the coins to be struck in both proof and uncirculated finishes. The coins were released May 6, 1991.

== Design ==
The obverse of the coin was designed by John Mercanti. It features a soldier climbing a hill with naval ships in the foreground, and two F-86 Sabres flying overhead. The reverse was designed by T. James Ferrell and features a map of Korea and the head of a Bald eagle.

== Production and sales ==
A maximum mintage of 1,000,000 Korean War Memorial dollars was authorized. A higher mintage was requested, but Mint Director Donna Pope cautioned that it would be difficult to sell over a million coins. The coin was struck in two versions, a proof coin (struck at the Philadelphia Mint) and an uncirculated coin (struck at the Denver Mint). Surcharges raised by the sale of the coins went towards the construction of the Korean War Veterans Memorial.

618,488 proof and 213,049 uncirculated coins were sold, for a total mintage of 831,537.

== See also ==
- List of United States commemorative coins and medals (1990s)
- United States commemorative coins
