= Robert F. Kennedy silver dollar =

1998 United States commemorative coin

Robert F. Kennedy dollar
- United States
- Value: 1 U.S. Dollar
- Mass: 26.730 g
- Diameter: 38.1 mm
- Thickness: 2.58 mm
- Edge: Reeded
- Composition: 90% Ag; 10% Cu
- Years of minting: 1997
- Mintage: 106,422 Uncirculated 99,020 Proof
- Mint marks: S

Obverse
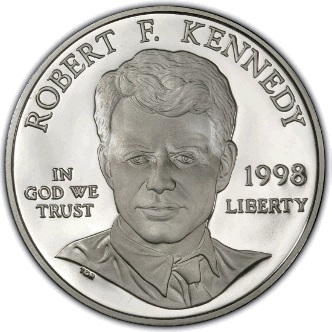
- Design: Robert F. Kennedy
- Designer: Thomas D. Rogers

Reverse
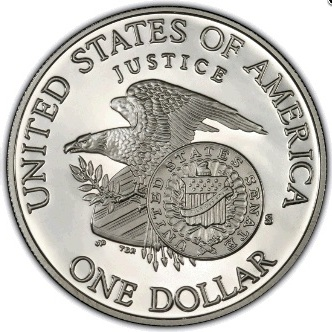
- Design: Eagle perched on shield
- Designer: James Peed and Thomas D. Rogers

The Robert F. Kennedy silver dollar is a commemorative coin issued by the United States Mint in 1998. It honors former United States Attorney General, U.S. Senator from New York, and assassinated presidential candidate Robert F. Kennedy.

== Legislation ==
Section 206 of Pub. L. 103–328 on September 29, 1994, authorized the production of the Robert F. Kennedy silver dollar coin to commemorate the life and work of Kennedy, former Attorney General of the United States and Senator from New York. The act allowed the coins to be struck in both proof and uncirculated finishes.

== Design ==
The obverse of the Robert F. Kennedy dollar, designed by Thomas D. Rogers, features a portrait of Kennedy. The reverse, designed by James Peed and modeled by Rogers, portrays the eagle and shield from the Seal of the Department of Justice overlapped by the Seal of the United States Senate. Robert Kennedy had served in both of these organizations.

== Specifications ==
- Display Box Color: Maroon
- Edge: Reeded
- Weight: 26.730 grams; 0.8594 troy ounce
- Diameter: 38.10 millimeters; 1.50 inches
- Composition: 90% Silver, 10% Copper

== See also ==
- List of United States commemorative coins and medals (1990s)
- United States commemorative coins
