= Prisoners of War silver dollar =

US commemorative coin

American Prisoners of War Silver Dollar
- United States
- Value: 1 U.S. dollar
- Mass: 26.73 g (0.859 troy oz)
- Diameter: 38.1 mm (1.500 in)
- Edge: Reeded
- Composition: 90% Ag, 10% Cu
- Years of minting: 1994
- Mint marks: P

Obverse
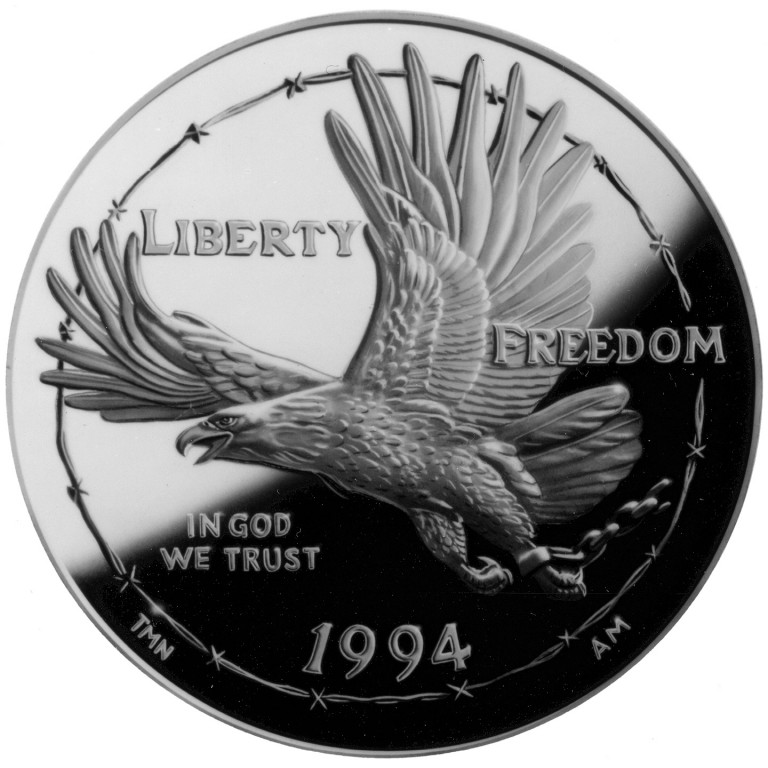
- Design: Chained eagle breaking free through a ring of barbed wire.
- Designer: Tom Nielsen
- Design date: 1994

Reverse
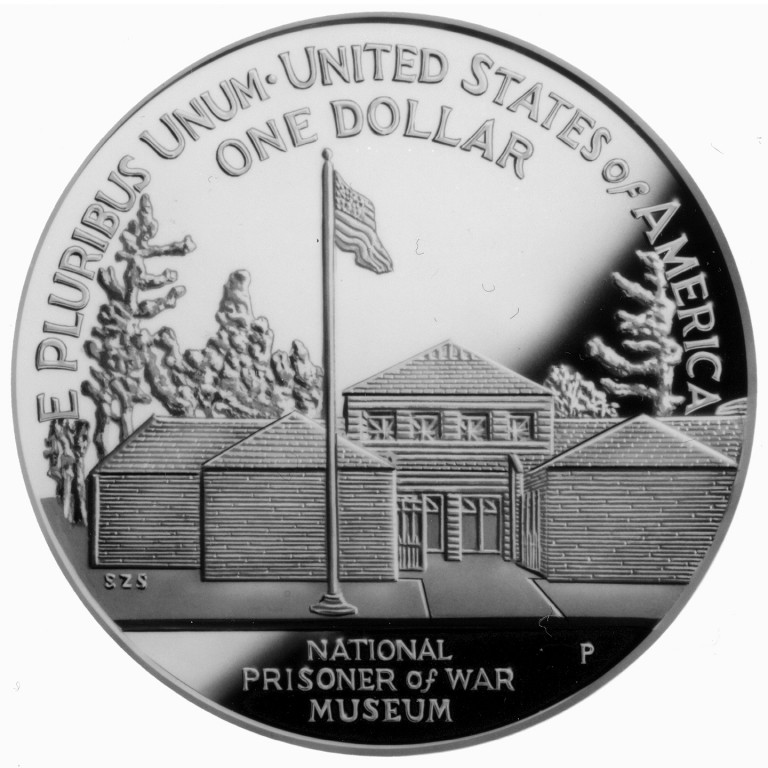
- Design: Proposed design for the National Prisoner of War Museum.
- Designer: Edgar Z. Steever, IV
- Design date: 1994

The Prisoners of War silver dollar is a commemorative coin issued by the United States Mint in 1994. It was one of three coins in the 1994 Veterans Program, along with the Vietnam Veterans Memorial and Women in Military Service for America Memorial silver dollars.

== Specifications ==
The following specifications are given by H.R. 3616.

- Weight: 26.73 grams (0.859 troy ounces)
- Diameter: 1.500 inches (38.1 mm)
- Composition: 90% Silver, 10% Copper

== See also ==
- List of United States commemorative coins and medals (1990s)
- United States commemorative coins
