= USO 50th Anniversary silver dollar =

U.S. commemorative silver dollar

- United States
- Value: 1 U.S. Dollar
- Mass: 26.73 g
- Diameter: 38.1 mm (1.5 in)
- Thickness: 2.58 mm
- Edge: Reeded
- Composition: 90% silver 10% copper
- Years of minting: 1991
- Mintage: 124,958 Uncirculated 321,275 Proof
- Mint marks: D (Denver Mint, uncirculated strikes); S (San Francisco Mint, proof strikes)

Obverse
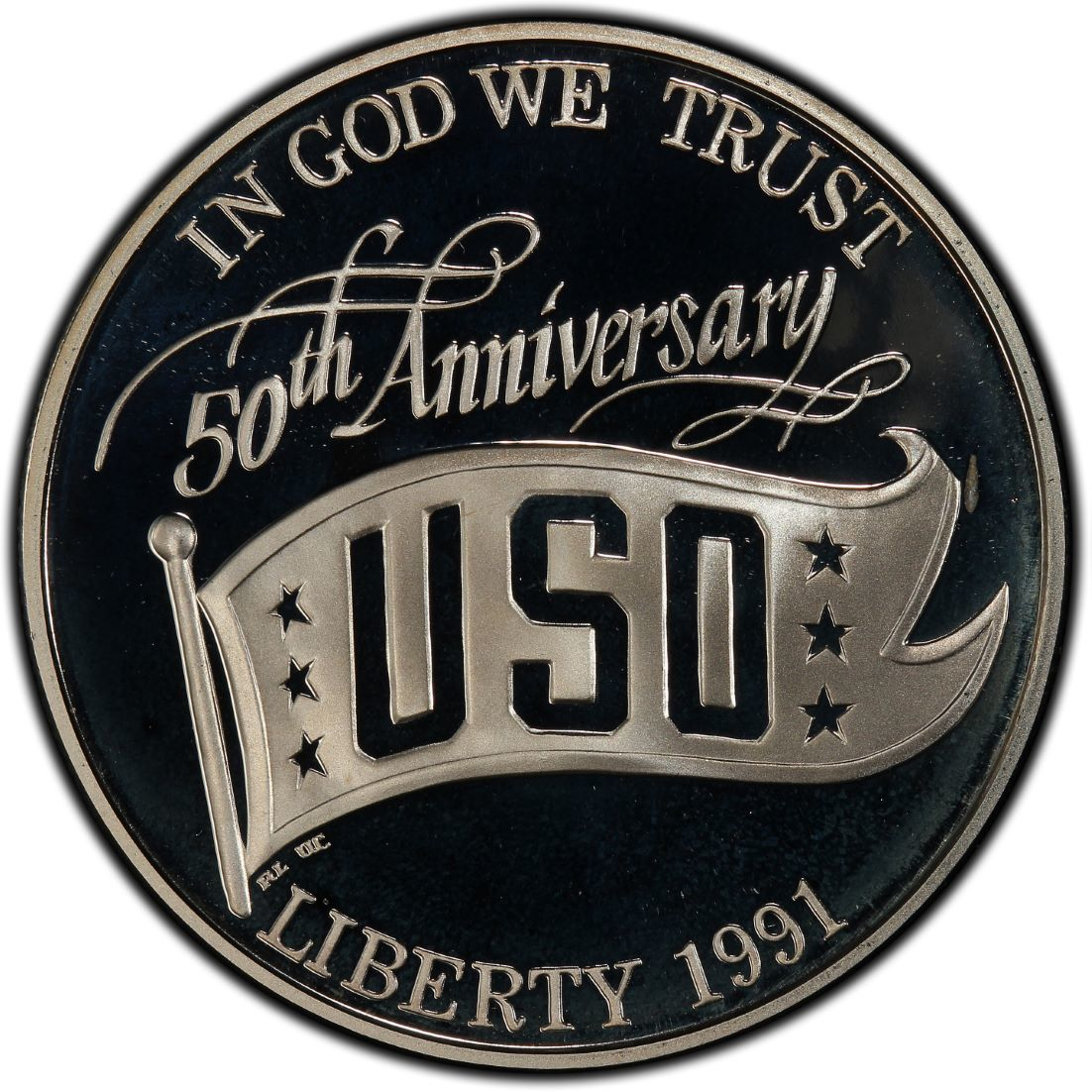
- Design: USO pennant and the words "50th Anniversary"
- Designer: Robert Lamb
- Design date: 1991

Reverse
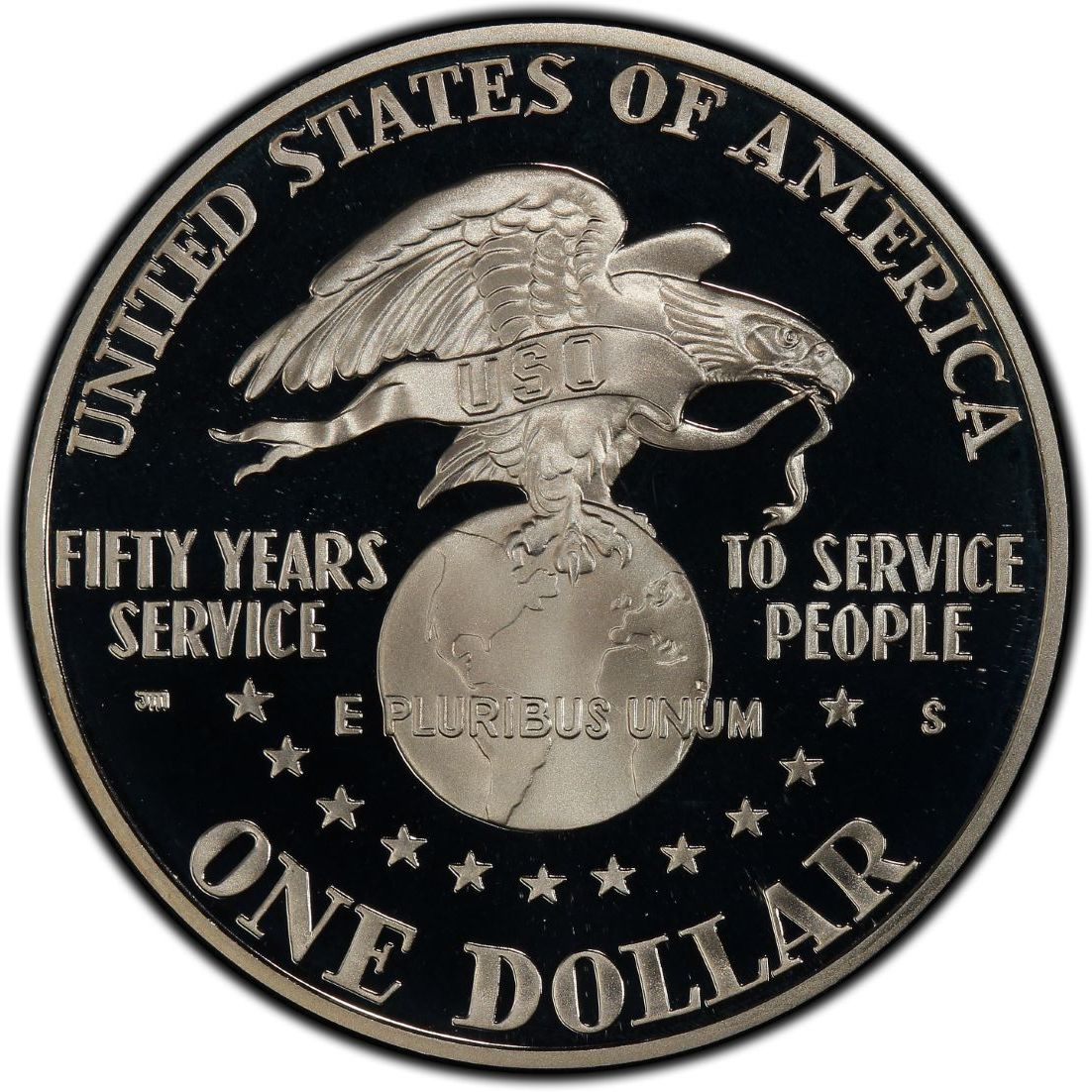
- Design: Eagle on top of a globe
- Designer: John Mercanti
- Design date: 1991

The United Service Organizations (USO) 50th Anniversary silver dollar is a commemorative coin issued by the United States Mint in 1991. The coin commemorates the 50th anniversary since the founding of the United Service Organizations in 1941.

== See also ==
- List of United States commemorative coins and medals (1990s)
- United States commemorative coins
