= Botanic Garden silver dollar =

United States commemorative coin

- United States
- Value: $1
- Years of minting: 1997

Obverse
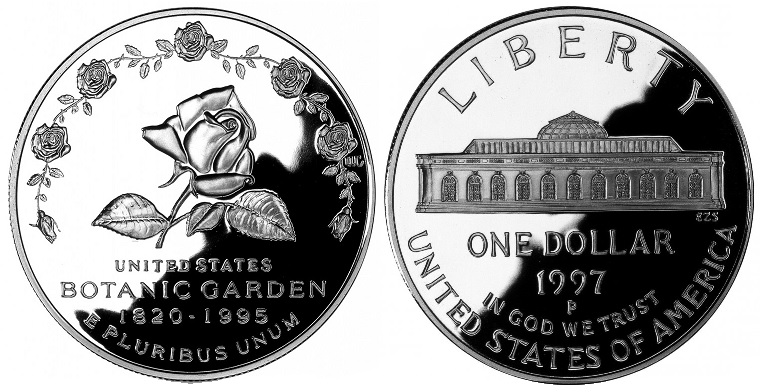

Reverse

The Botanic Garden silver dollar is a commemorative dollar issued by the United States Mint in 1997.

== See also ==
- List of United States commemorative coins and medals (1990s)
- United States commemorative coins
