= Symbols of the United States Senate =

Emblem used to authenticate official U.S. Senate documents

Seal of the United States Senate
- Armiger: United States Senate
- Adopted: 1886
- Crest: Liberty Cap
- Shield: Arms of the United States
- Supporters: Olive and Oak branches
- Motto: E pluribus unum
- Other elements: Fasces
- Earlier version(s): 1798 and 1831
- Use: Sealing of Senate documents, and by the Senate Majority and Minority Leaders

The United States Senate is represented by many symbols, including its official seal, several other unofficial seals, the eagle and shield, and the Senate gavel.

== Seal ==
The seal of the United States Senate is the seal officially adopted by the United States Senate to authenticate certain official documents. Its design also sometimes serves as a sign and symbol of the Senate, appearing on its official flag among other places. The current version dates from 1886, and is the third seal design used by the Senate since its inception in 1789. The use of the seal is restricted by federal law and other regulations, and so is used sparingly, to the point that there are alternate, non-official seal designs more commonly seen in public.

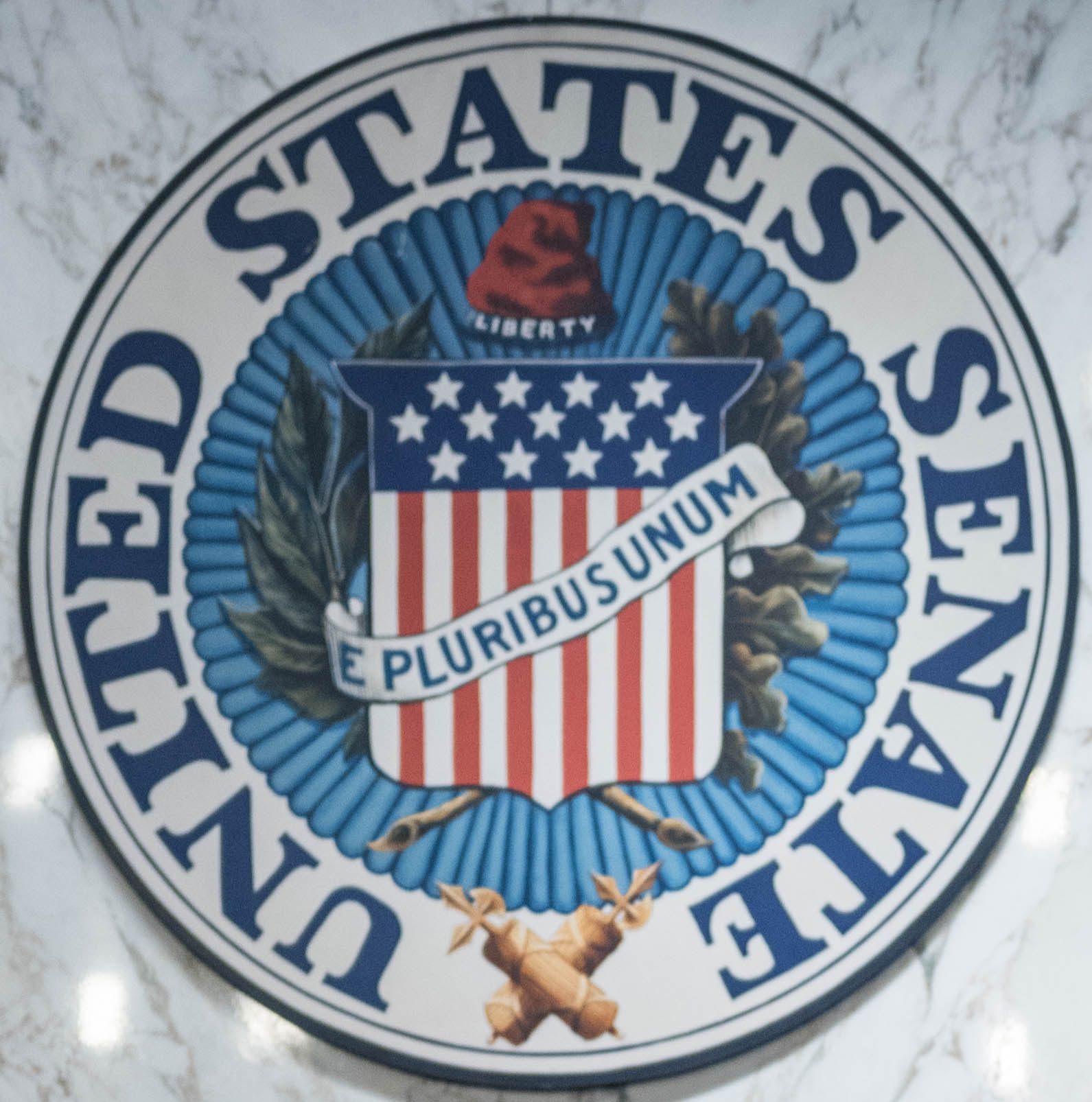
The Seal in a Senate hearing chamber.

The seal has a shield with 13 stars on top and 13 vertical stripes on the bottom, with a scroll inscribed with E pluribus unum floating across the top. An olive branch, symbolizing peace, graces the left side of the shield, while an oak branch, symbolizing strength, is on the right. A red liberty cap above the shield and crossed fasces below the shield represent freedom and authority, respectively. Blue beams of light emanate from the shield. Surrounding the seal is the legend "United States Senate". Several of the elements are derived from the Great Seal of the United States.

=== Usage ===
The seal is affixed to impeachment documents and resolutions of consent to international treaties. It also appears on presentation copies of Senate resolutions recognizing appointments, commendations, and notable achievements. Other uses include authentication of senator credentials, and also electoral votes for President and Vice President. The seal is kept in the custody of the Secretary of the Senate, who also can authorize other specific uses. In the twentieth century, the Secretary has authorized its official use by the majority and minority leaders.

It is illegal to use the Senate seal in any manner reasonably calculated to convey a false impression of sponsorship or approval by the Government of the United States.

=== Depictions ===
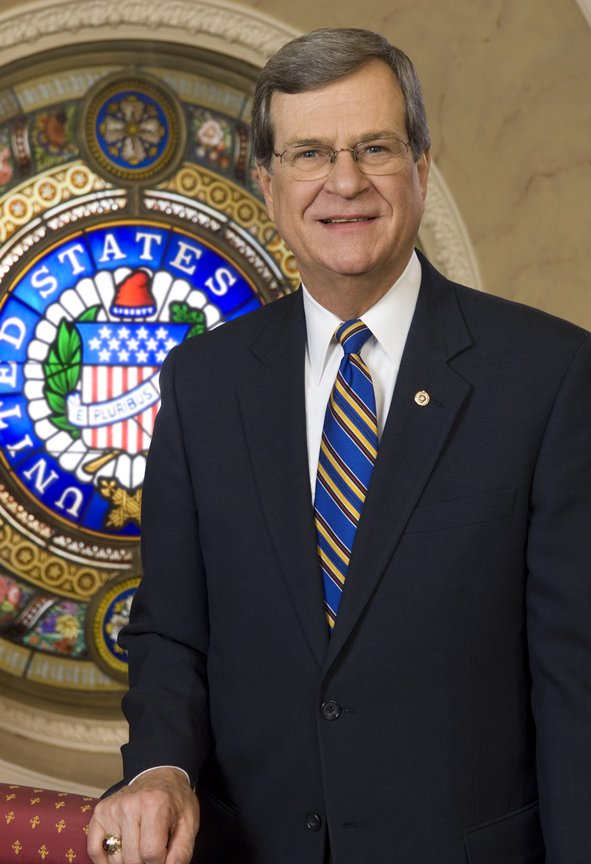
Trent Lott posing next to the Senate seal

The seal is depicted in a stained glass window in the United States Capitol. There are four grand staircases in the building, and all four stairwells contain a large stained glass window, each with a different design. One of these windows, on the Senate side of the Capitol, originally depicted an eagle with a shield and flags of the United States but it was accidentally destroyed in the 1960s. The window was initially filled in with frosted glass, but was later replaced with a colorful design depicting the senate seal. The window is also visible from the office on the other side (room S-210, currently the majority whip's office). An image of this window served as the theme of the Senate's web page from about 2002 to 2006.

The Senate never had an official flag until the 1980s, even though by then most other government agencies, departments, and offices had one. In April 1984, Senator Daniel Inouye of Hawaii proposed that the Senate commission an official flag using the design of the Senate seal. After turning down several submitted designs, the committee turned to the Army Institute of Heraldry, which proposed a navy blue flag with the seal in the center. This was approved in 1987, and the flags were made available in March 1988. Each senator and committee were limited to two flags apiece, and in keeping with the usual limits on the seal, use of the flags is restricted to Senate offices only, and commercial use is prohibited. A Senate flag is also hung above the dais of the Hart Building’s central hearing room.

The Senate seal, along with the seal of the Department of Justice, was used on the reverse of the 1998 commemorative dollar coin honoring Robert F. Kennedy. The seals symbolized Kennedy's career in the U.S. government, first as United States Attorney General and later as a senator from New York.

At least during the 1960s, a painted version of the seal was also on the ceiling of the office of the Secretary of the Senate.

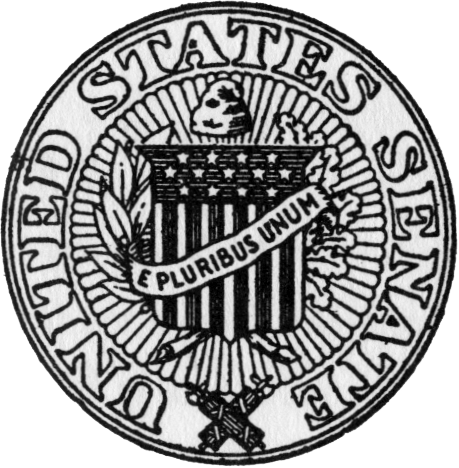
From the 1966 History of the Senate Seals

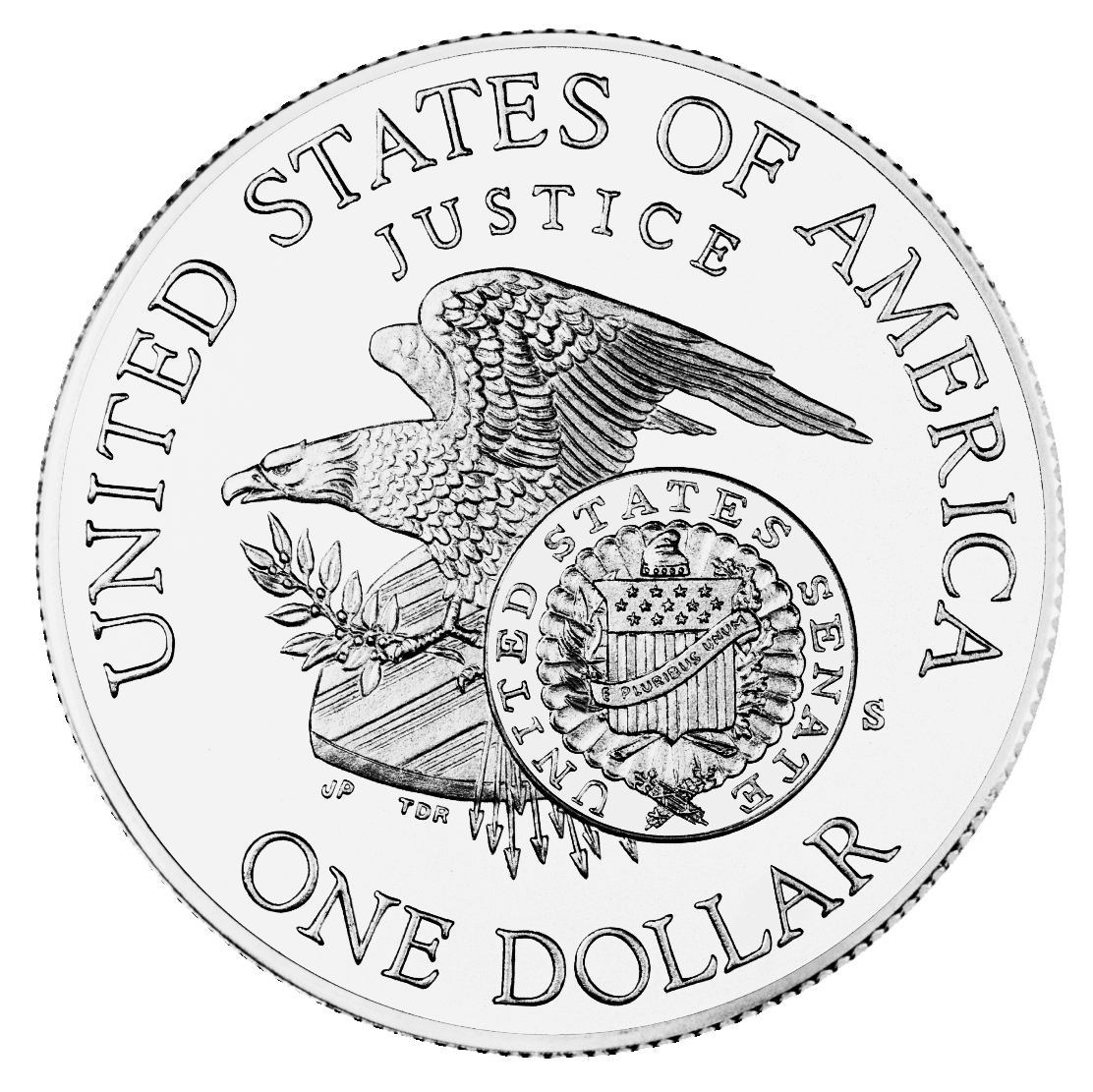
Robert F. Kennedy silver dollar reverse

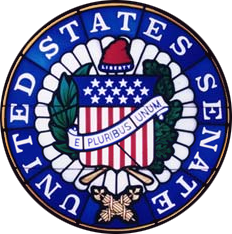
Stained glass window in Capitol

=== History ===
==== 1790s seal ====
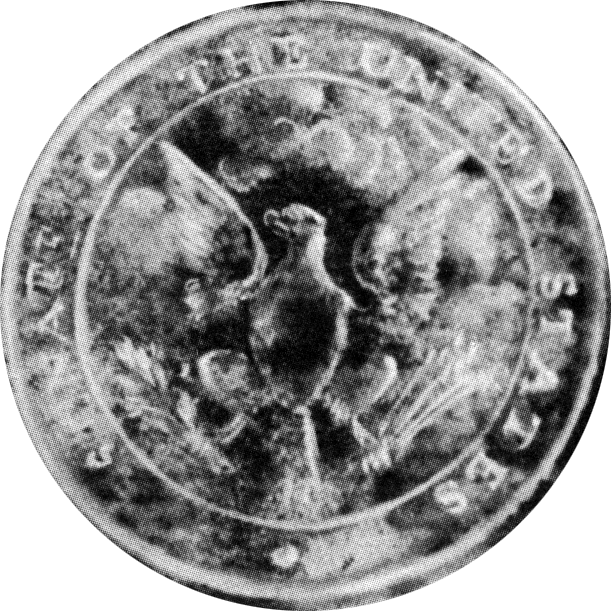
Seal used from 1798 to 1804

When first meeting in Philadelphia in the 1790s, members of the early Senate admired the visually appealing Great Seal enough that they had it reproduced on a carpet woven for their chamber. They also selected a similar design for the first official Senate seal.

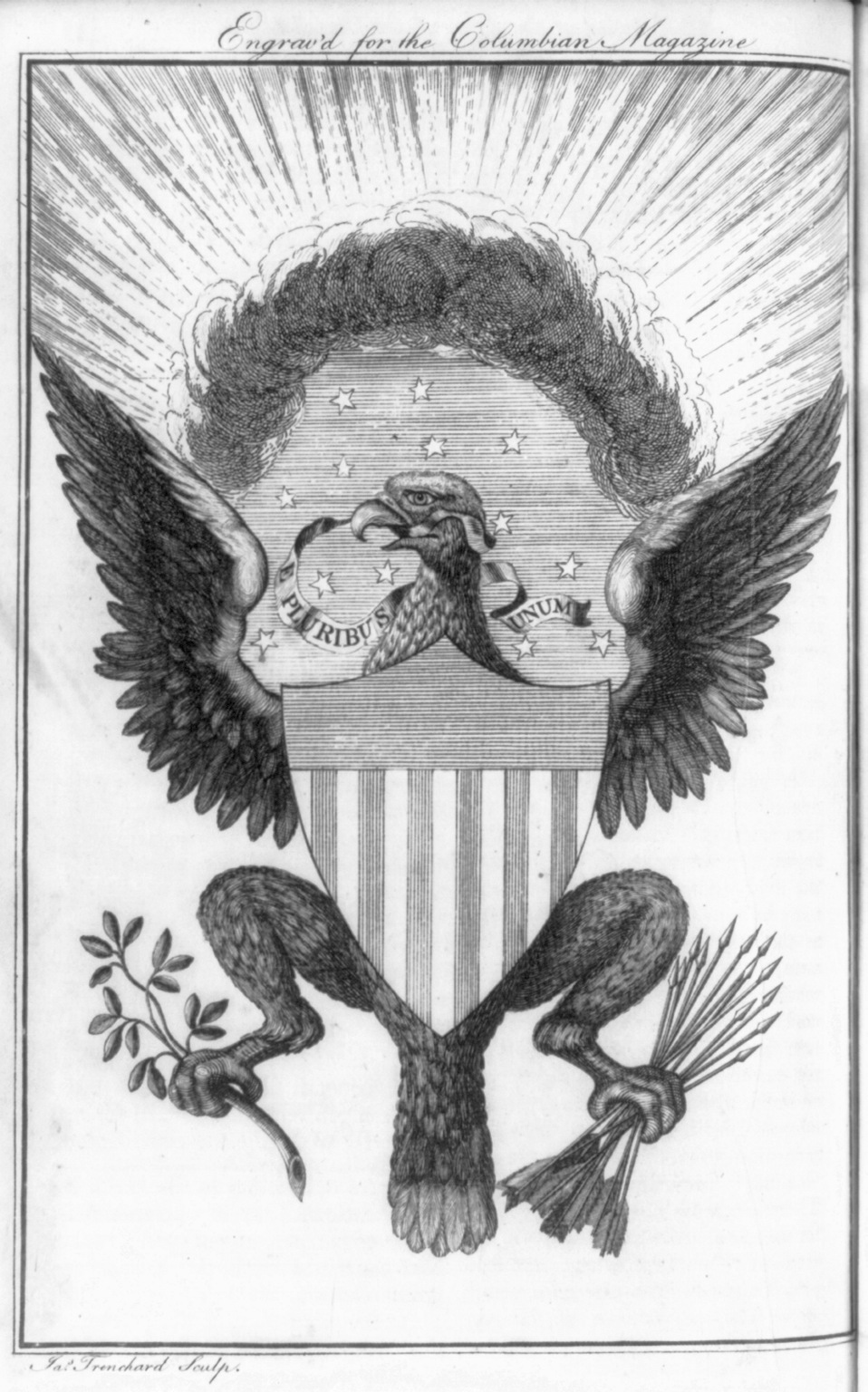
James Trenchard's 1786 Great Seal

This first design had an eagle with a shield on its breast, olive branches in its left talon, and arrows in its right. Above the eagle were rays of light emanating from clouds, representing the emergence of the new nation. Encircling the design was the legend SENATE OF THE UNITED STATES. While the design was clearly based on the Great Seal of the United States, the engraving was distinctly different. It had a spade shield instead of the more familiar shape on the Great Seal, and the eagle had no scroll in its beak. The design of the clouds and light rays was also different, and the inscription showed it was a seal made specifically for the Senate (the Great Seal has no inscription at all). The design is actually closer to a rendition made by James Trenchard for the September 1786 Columbian Magazine, which was also later used on the reverse side of a few Indian Peace Medals given by President Washington in about the same time frame as the Senate seal was made.

Exactly when this first seal was made, or by whom, is not known.

The first known use of this seal was on the March 1798 impeachment summons of Tennessee Senator William Blount. Six years later, the seal appeared on another impeachment summons, this time for Federal Judge John Pickering, and other documents during his trial.

==== 1831 seal ====
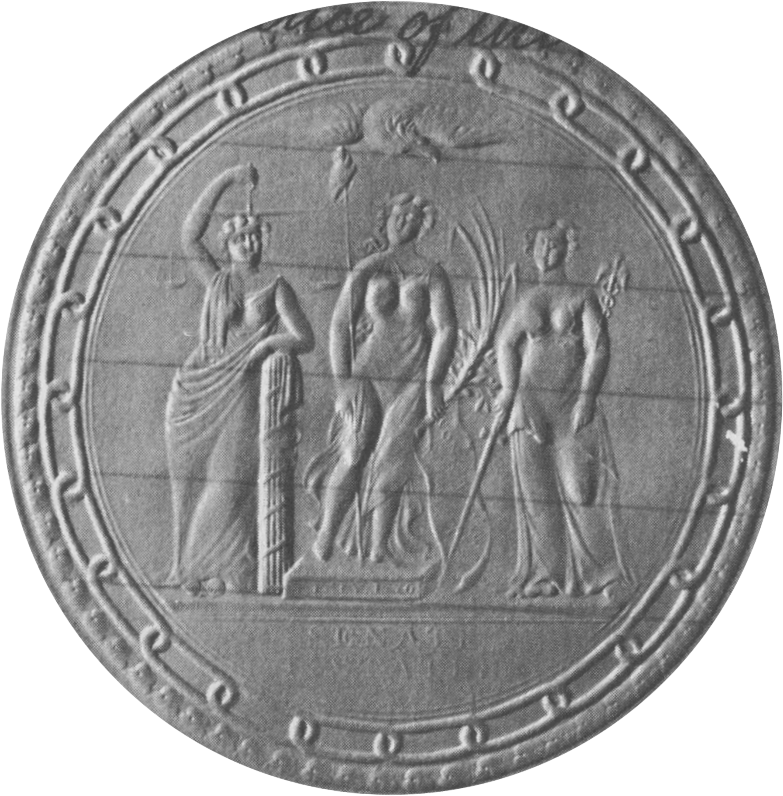
Seal used from 1831 to 1880

By 1830, the first Senate seal was either unserviceable due to wear or simply lost after a period of not being used. A new seal was commissioned from Robert G. Lanphier Jr., a French artist, engraver and jeweler living in Washington D.C. at the time. The press and counterseal were made by Edward Stabler, the postmaster at Sandy Spring, Maryland from 1830 until his death in 1883. Stabler had engraved the seal for the House of Representatives in 1830, and also would later make the seals for most federal government departments of the time, some states, and several municipalities.

This second design was inspired by the then-popular Greek and Roman models, depicting three female figures which symbolized liberty, justice, and power. An eagle is above the figures, and twenty-four links of a chain bordering the seal represent the number of states then in the Union. The central Liberty figure is standing on a platform inscribed with 4 JULY 1776, and is holding a pole with a Phrygian cap, a palm branch of victory and rejoicing, and a scroll inscribed with CONSTITUTION, MARCH 4, 1789. She is depicted in the process of walking, with one toe leaving the ground and her weight on her left foot. The Justice figure is holding the scales of justice, and leaning on fasces, a symbol of authority. The Power figure holds a sword in her right hand, and a caduceus in her left, a symbol of commerce and peace.

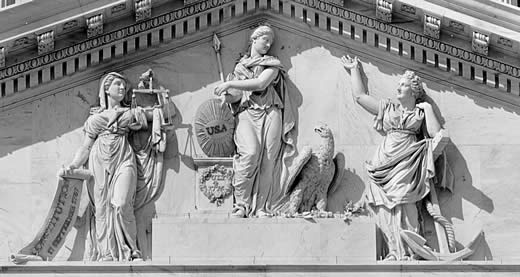
Genius of America by Luigi Persico

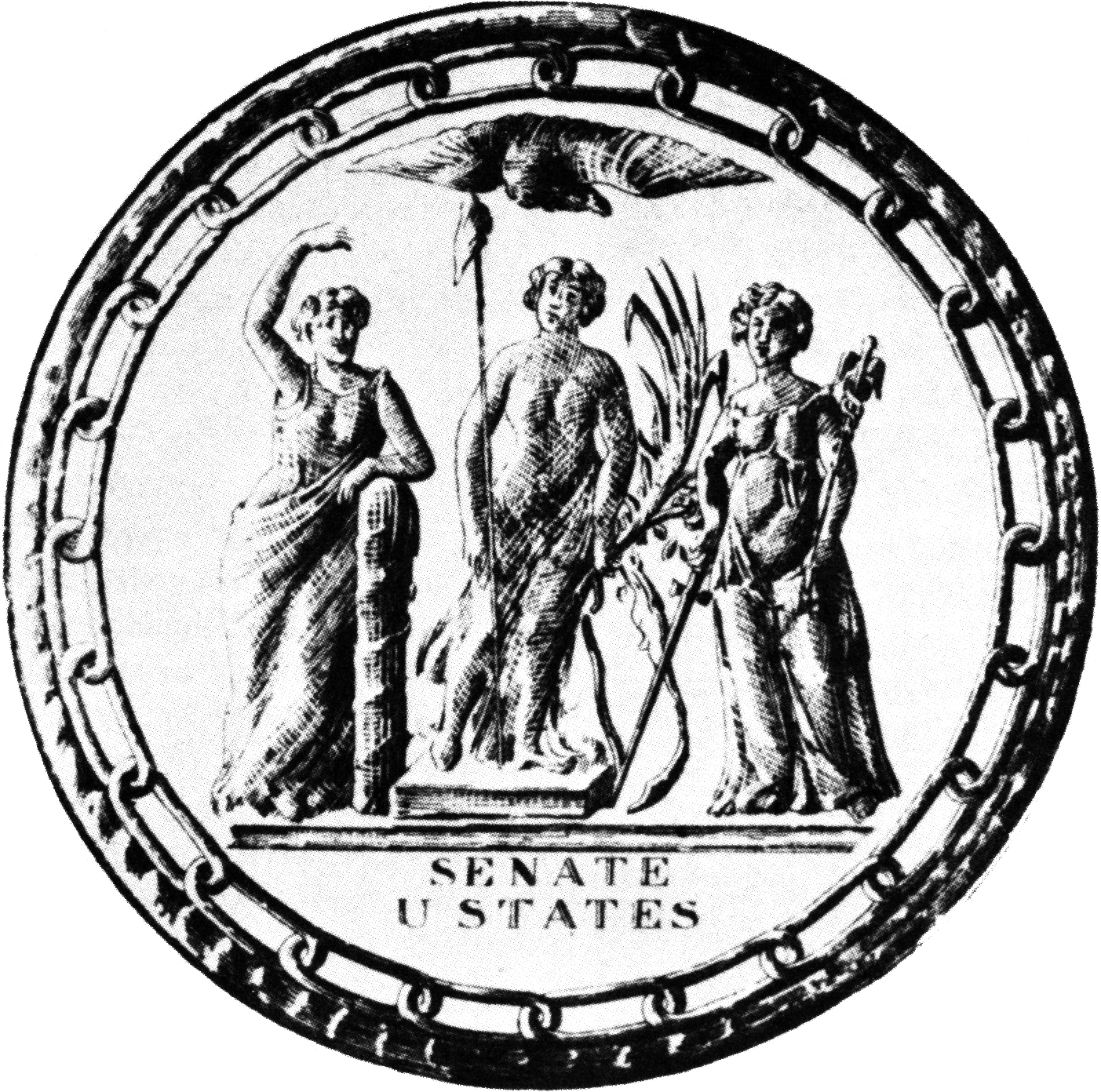
1885 engraving

The design has some similarities to Genius of America, the sculpture over the central east pediment of the Capitol building which had recently been completed. Made by Luigi Persico from 1825 to 1828, it also features three female figures, representing America, Justice, and Hope. Elements shared between the two designs include a July 4 pedestal, a scroll with a Constitution inscription, the scales of justice, and an eagle.

During the 1868 impeachment trial of President Andrew Johnson, the seal was affixed to both the articles of impeachment and copies of documents submitted in evidence. The second seal was used until 1880, when it was discovered "tucked away among some rubbish in one of the subterranean rooms of the Capitol" (apparently left there following heavy use during an 1876 impeachment trial). By this time, the seal was well worn. An engraving of the seal made for the March 26, 1885 edition of the Daily Graphic did not show either the 1776 or 1789 inscriptions, the scales of justice, nor a recognizable scroll, all presumably because these were no longer discernible on impressions made by the seal.

==== 1886 seal ====
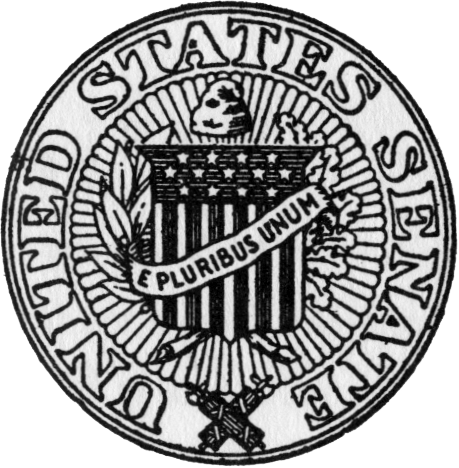
Seal used since 1886

The 1876 United States Centennial renewed interest in national symbols, which eventually prompted a redesign of the Great Seal in 1885. On March 31, 1885, the Senate ordered an updating of its own seal. During the discussions, many senators did not even know a Senate seal existed.

After considering several submitted designs, the Senate chose one by Louis Dreka, an engraver and stationer from Philadelphia. He was given $35 to make the press and seal, which measured one-and-a-half inches in diameter. This design is the one still in use today. The physical seal itself is stored in a mahogany cabinet.

There had never been any official declaration about who should use the seal, and under what circumstances. This was also remedied at the time, with the Congressional Record, vol. 17, p. 769 stating:

Resolved, That the Secretary shall have the custody of the seal, and shall use the same for the authentication of process transcripts, copies, and certificates whenever directed by the Senate; and may use the same to authenticate copies of such papers and documents in his offices as he may lawfully give copies of.

In the twentieth century, the Secretary of the Senate has authorized official use of the seal by the majority and minority leaders.

=== Unofficial seals ===

Because the official Senate seal is used only to authenticate official Senate documents, and not normally as a general visual symbol, the Secretary of the Senate has also authorized an alternative, non-official Senate seal. This alternative seal, which features an eagle clutching arrows and an olive branch in its talons, surrounded by the words "United States Senate," is commonly used by Senate offices and is often displayed on items sold in the Senate gift shop. Even more commonly seen perhaps is a version of the Great Seal of the United States (which also depicts an eagle clutching arrows and an olive branch in its claws) surrounded by a similar inscription. These often appear on Senate web pages, on podiums when senators speak, and other situations. The House of Representatives also uses similar designs for their unofficial seals, and since the United States Congress as a whole does not have an official seal, similar designs are often used with a Congress inscription.

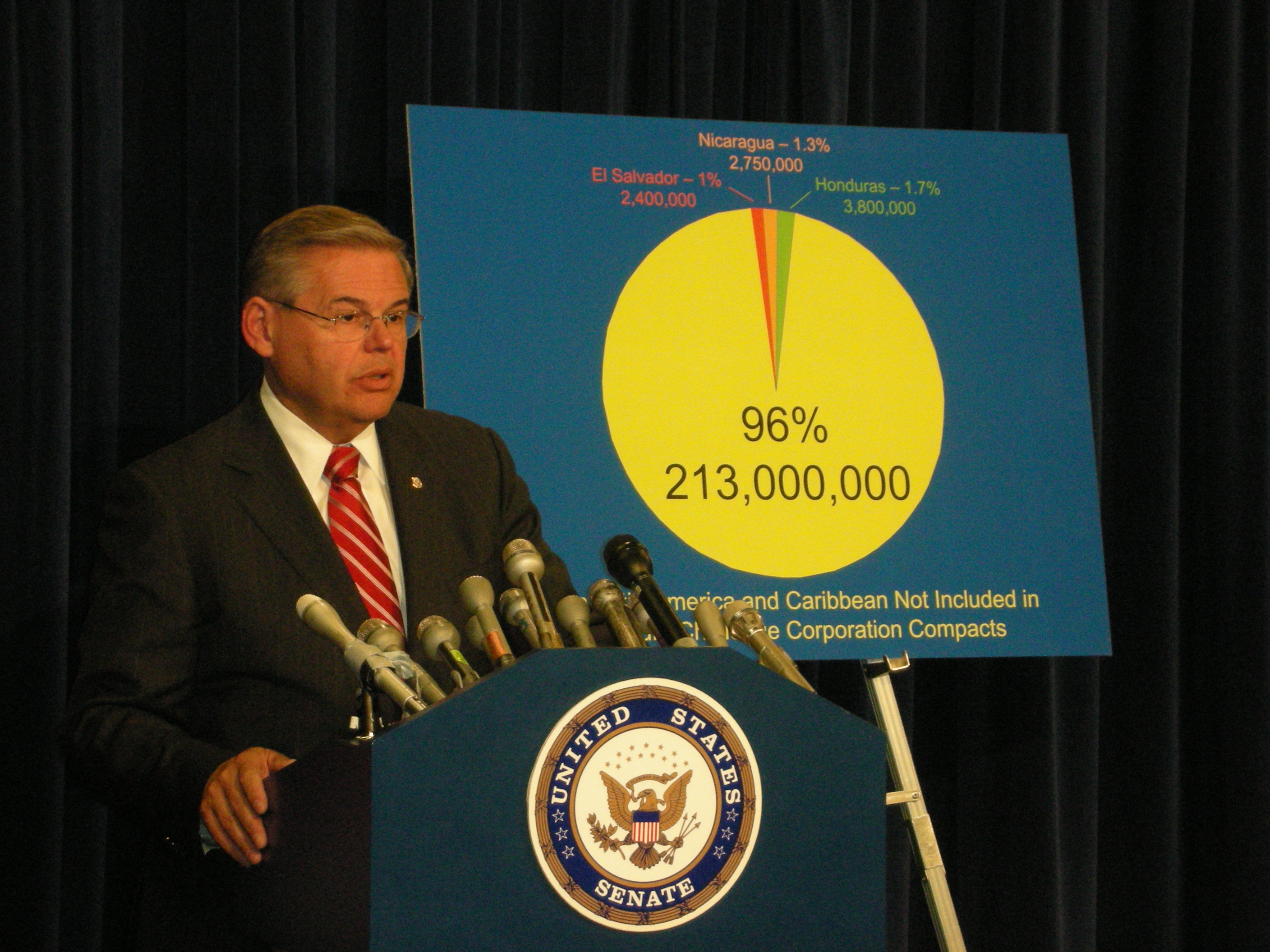
Senator Bob Menendez press conference, with the alternate seal on the podium

Both the Senate Seal and the Great Seal are protected by 18 U.S.C. § 713, a criminal statute which restricts the knowing display of the Senate Seal or the Great Seal or any facsimile thereof in any manner reasonably calculated to convey a false impression of sponsorship or approval by the Government of the United States. The Senate ethics manual states that in most cases use of the Senate Seal or the Great Seal for normal official Senate business would be appropriate; however, commercial use, personal use or campaign use by senators would be improper. Additionally, campaign use of any of the unofficial, alternate seals would also be improper. The manual suggests that senators who want to show a symbol of government on campaign material use a depiction of the United States Capitol dome. In 2005, Representative Duke Cunningham was found to be selling items on a personal web site which included the unofficial Congress seal, which were shortly thereafter discontinued. Similarly, Senator Richard Durbin was dinged by a few bloggers after his campaign site showed a video message where an unofficial Senate seal (the Great Seal variant) appeared in one corner; the video was quickly taken down.

== Other Senate symbols ==
=== Eagle and Shield ===
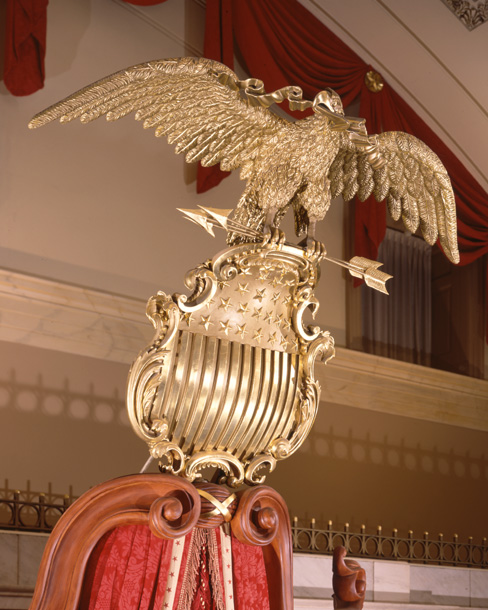
Eagle and Shield

The Eagle and Shield is a gilded wood sculpture which is currently on the dais of the Old Senate Chamber, as it was when the Senate used that room in the 1800s. It dates from at least 1838, when it was referenced in a newspaper article and Daniel Webster speech, and may be from about 1834. The 1838 newspaper article includes a first-hand eyewitness account of its original installation in the Old Senate Chamber and attributes carving of the eagle and shield directly to Mr. Thomas C. Millard (1803–1870). Millard was a New York City woodcarver who was active from the 1830s to 1860s and well known for his life-sized animals and human figures. The eagle is life-sized at 53.5 inches (135.9 cm) high, 72 inches (182.9 cm) wide, and 23 inches (58.4 cm) deep, and the design is derived from the Great Seal of the United States. When the Senate moved to its new quarters in 1859 and the Supreme Court took over use of the room, the shield was placed over one of the outside doors, while the eagle was placed elsewhere in the room. In 1976, long after the Supreme Court moved to their own building, the two pieces were reunited and placed back on the dais when the chamber was restored. It has become an enduring symbol of the Senate.

Senate website logo

A stylized version has been used as a logo for the Senate on its website since 2006, and also from 1999 to 2002. In the intervening period, the website used an image of the stained glass window of the official Senate seal. The logo is also used on several online Senate publications.

=== Senate gavel ===
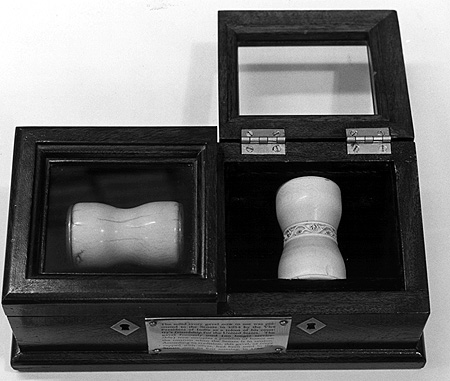
Old and new gavels in their box

The seal of the President pro tempore

The Senate gavel is wielded by the presiding officer of the Senate, usually either the Vice President or President pro tempore, and is used to signify the commencement or adjournment of a Senate session. It is made of ivory, has no handle, and is 2 1/2 inches high by 1 3/8 inches in diameter. The original gavel was in use at least as far back as 1831, and according to one account was used by John Adams during the first Senate meetings on March 4, 1789.

The gavel deteriorated during the 1940s, and in 1952 silver pieces were attached to try to limit further damage. However, in 1954, Then-Vice President Richard Nixon pounded it during a heated debate over atomic energy, and it completely came apart. Officials wanted to recreate the gavel exactly, but not enough ivory was available commercially; Senate officials therefore contacted the government of India for help in sourcing the correct amount of ivory. On November 17, 1954, the Vice-President of India, Sarvepalli Radhakrishnan, presented the assembled Senate with a replacement gavel, which is still in use today. It was a duplicate of the original, with the addition of a decorative floral band around the center. Both the original and new gavels are stored in a mahogany box; each day a Senate page places the box on the presiding officer's desk.

It has become customary to have new senators preside over the senate (and thus wield the gavel) in one-hour shifts so they can learn Senate procedures. Usually this is limited to members of the majority party, but in periods where the Senate is evenly divided, senators from each party will often alternate.

The seal of the President pro tempore of the United States Senate includes a representation of the original gavel, with several depictions even showing its cracks, along with two quill pens and elements from the official Senate seal.
