= T. James Ferrell =

American engraver and medalist (1939–2020)

- Born: Thomas James Ferrell; September 28, 1939; Clayton, New Jersey, US
- Died: May 27, 2020 (aged 80)
- Education: Pennsylvania Academy of the Fine Arts; Barnes Foundation
- Known for: Engraving

Thomas James Ferrell (September 28, 1939 – May 27, 2020) was an American engraver and medalist best known for his work for The Franklin Mint.

== Biography ==
Ferrell was born on September 28, 1939, in Clayton, New Jersey, and graduated as part of the class of 1959 from Clayton High School, where he played baseball and football, and was recognized for his art work. He graduated from the Pennsylvania Academy of the Fine Arts in 1963 and worked for the Philadelphia Bulletin for six years. He later studied at the Barnes Foundation.

In 1969, Ferrell began working for The Franklin Mint as a medalist. In August 1989, he was appointed to the engraving department of the United States Mint. While there, he engraved the Connecticut, Florida, Georgia, Kentucky and Vermont quarters, as well as many commemorative coins, including the reverse of the Korean War Memorial silver dollar and both sides of the Thomas Jefferson 250th Anniversary silver dollar. He retired in March 2003.

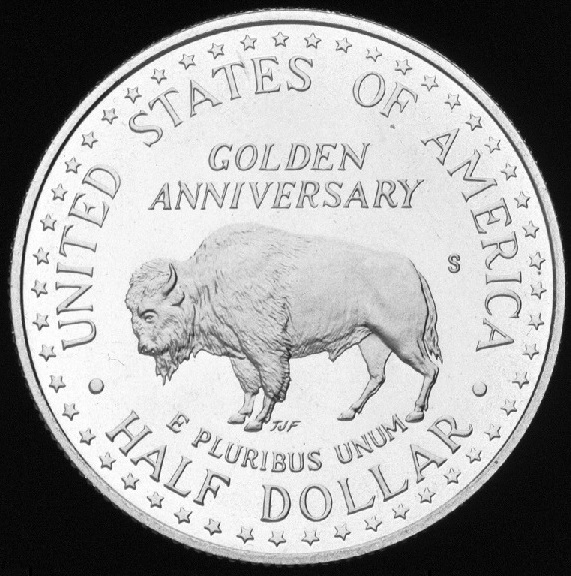
The reverse of the 1991 Mount Rushmore Anniversary coin, designed by Ferrell

In 2002, the American Numismatic Association awarded Ferrell the Numismatic Art Award for Excellence in Medallic Sculpture.

He died in his sleep on May 27, 2020, aged 80.
