= Thomas D. Rogers =

Sculptor-engraver with the United States Mint

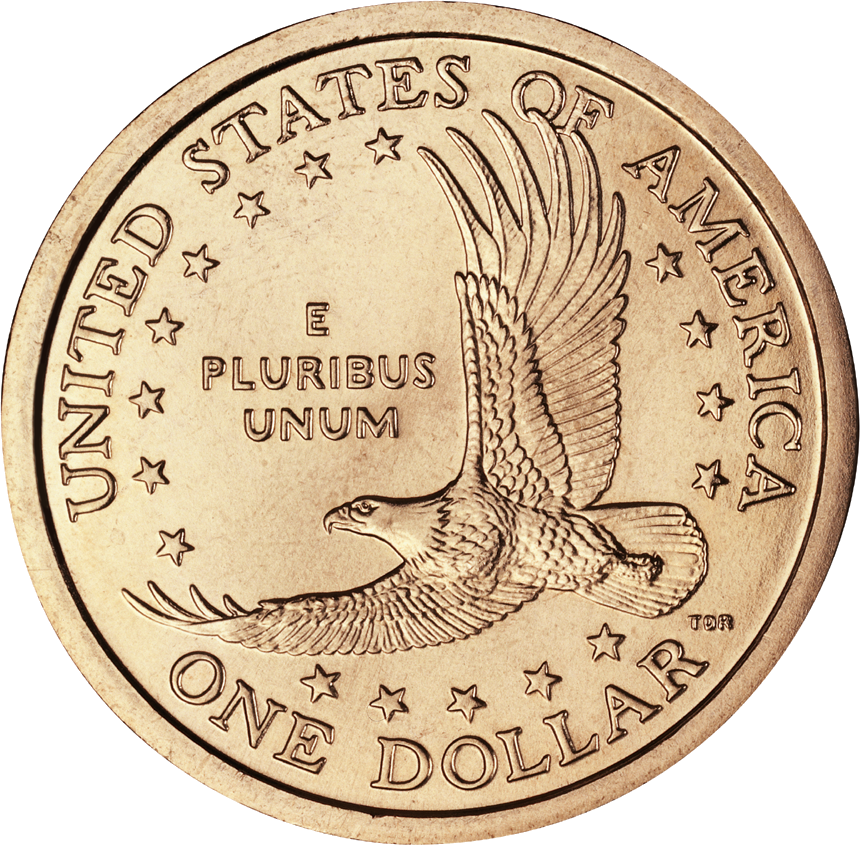
Among the coins designed by Rogers is the original reverse of the U.S. dollar coin popularly known as the Sacagawea dollar. It depicts an eagle in flight.

Thomas D. Rogers, Sr. (born August 1945) is a former sculptor-engraver with the United States Mint and designer of several U.S. coins, including the 2000–2008 reverse side of the United States Golden dollar coins, or Sacagawea dollars. Rogers holds an A.A.S. degree with a major in commercial art.

== Early life ==
Rogers was raised in Wingdale, New York, and served four years in the United States Navy.

== Career ==
Rogers joined the U.S. Mint in October 1991, working at the Philadelphia Mint facility, and retired in 2001. His design for the Sacagawea dollar was modified slightly before it went into circulation.

Rogers designed the reverses of four of the State Quarters, including those for Maryland, Massachusetts and South Carolina. He designed the original reverse of the American Platinum Eagle, which was used on the proof version of that coin's first year (1997) and on non-proof Platinum Eagles of all dates, and designed the reverses of two subsequent years of the proof version of the same coin, those of 1998 and 2001.

Additionally, Rogers designed the obverses of the 1996 silver $1 coin commemorating the 150th anniversary of the Smithsonian Institution, the 1998 Robert F. Kennedy silver dollar, and the 2000 Library of Congress $10 coin, and designed both sides of several other United States commemorative coins.

Although retired from the U.S. Mint, Rogers has subsequently carried out some design work for the Mint as an independent artist under contract. In 2014, Rogers designed the reverse of the 2016 Sacagawea dollar, which honors Native American code talkers from World Wars I and II.

== Personal life ==
As of 2003 he was residing in Long Beach, Washington, and as of 2009 he was living and working in Oregon.
