= Frieda Hardin =

American war veteran (1896–2000)

Frieda Mae Green Hardin
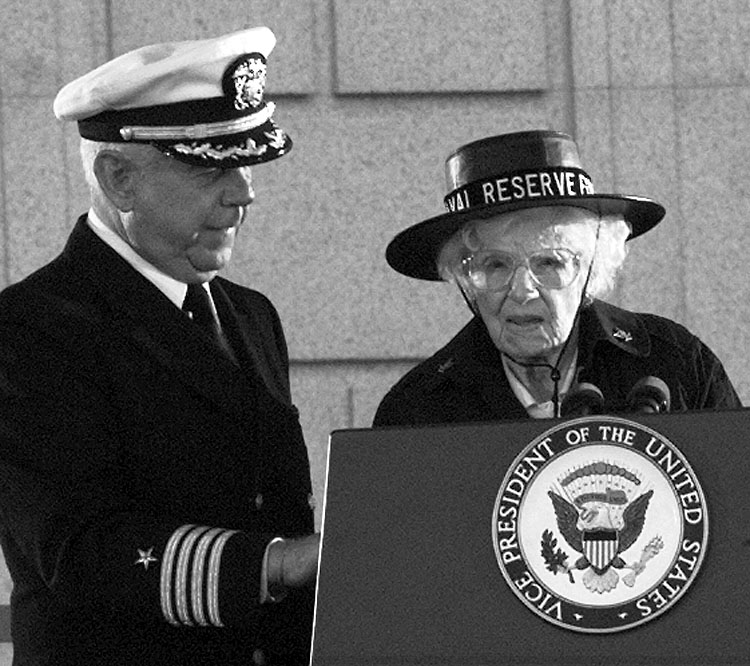
- Hardin speaking at the dedication of the Women in Military Service for America Memorial (1997)
- Born: September 22, 1896; Eden Valley, Minnesota
- Died: August 9, 2000 (aged 103); Livermore, California
- Burial place: Arlington National Cemetery
- Military career
- Allegiance: United States
- Branch: United States Navy
- Service years: 1918–1920
- Rank: Yeoman (F)
- Conflicts: World War I

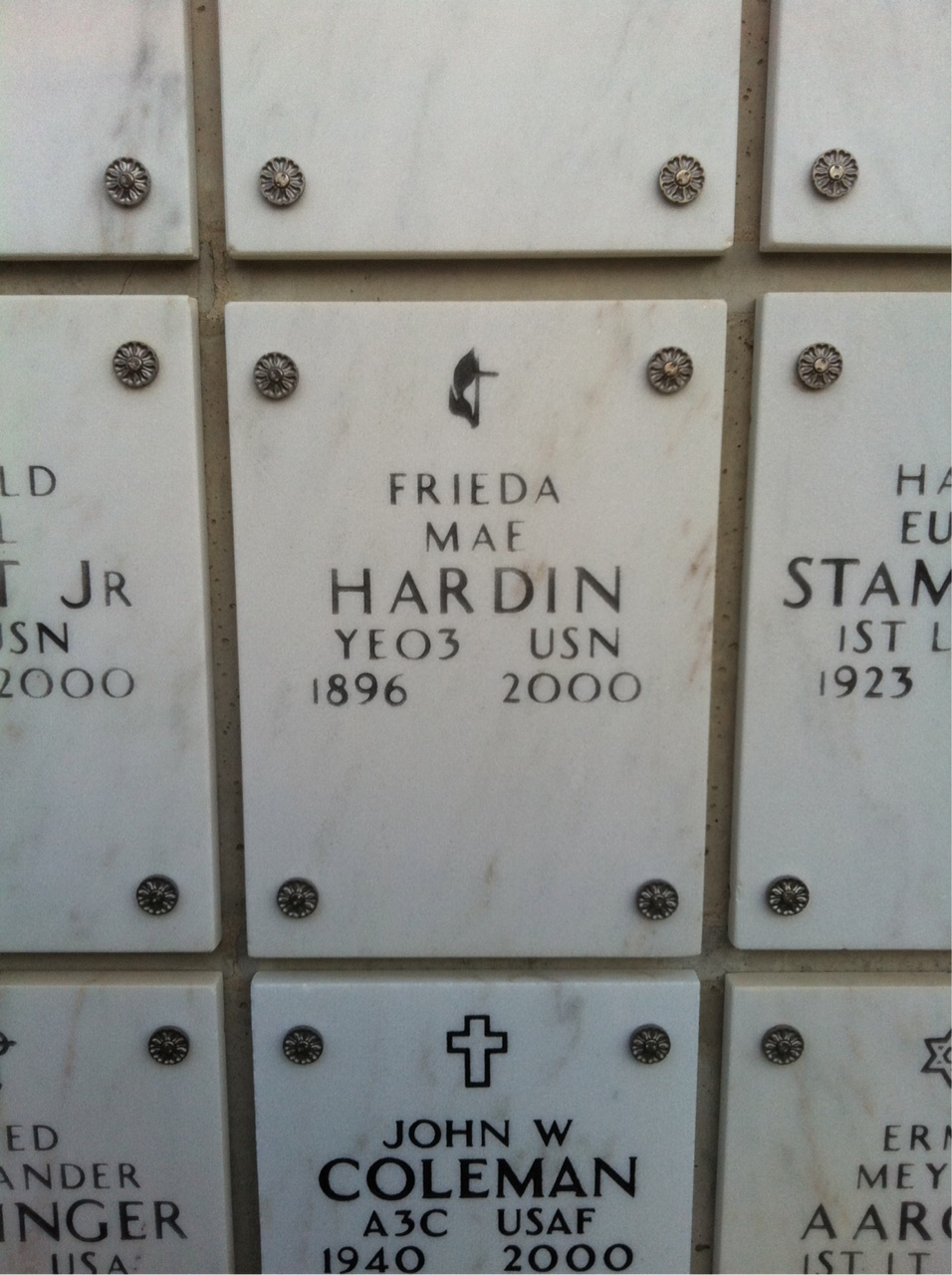
Grave at Arlington National Cemetery

Frieda Mae Green Hardin (September 22, 1896 in Eden Valley, Minnesota – August 9, 2000 in Livermore, California) was an American veteran. She served in World War I and in 1997 was prominently involved in the ceremony dedicating the Women in Military Service for America Memorial. Upon her death at the age of 103, Hardin was described as the "oldest female veteran in the U.S."

== Biography ==
Frieda Mae Green was born on September 22, 1896, in Eden Valley, Minnesota. As a child her family moved to Flat Gap, Kentucky, and later Ohio.

She joined the U.S. Navy at the end of World War I in 1918, enlisting, against her parents' wishes, at the age of 22 in Portsmouth, Ohio. Her mother told her to "come home right this instant!" upon hearing of her decision. Navy Secretary Josephus Daniels had asked women to enlist in the Naval Reserve, so sailors in it could fight, as American entry into World War I loomed. About 12,000 women served in the Navy during the war, known as "Yeomanettes". Hardin was stationed in Norfolk Navy Yard, Virginia, from September 1918 to March 1919 as a clerk. After 1920 women were not allowed to serve in the Navy until the outbreak of World War II.

She then moved back to Portsmouth, Ohio and married the first of four husbands, all of whom she outlived. She had three sons and a daughter from this marriage. All three sons served in World War II.

Hardin attended the October 18, 1997 ceremonies dedicating the Women in Military Service for America Memorial. She was a featured speaker to the crowd of around 30,000 people, along with then-Vice President Al Gore. An obituary published in the Los Angeles Times wrote that "Harden easily upstaged" the other speakers. She spoke for ten minutes.

== Death ==
On August 9, 2000, Hardin died at the Veterans Affairs nursing home in Livermore, California, shortly before she would have turned 104. She was buried in Arlington National Cemetery. Upon her death, Hardin was described as the "oldest female veteran in the U.S."
