= United States Proof Set =

Set of American proof coins

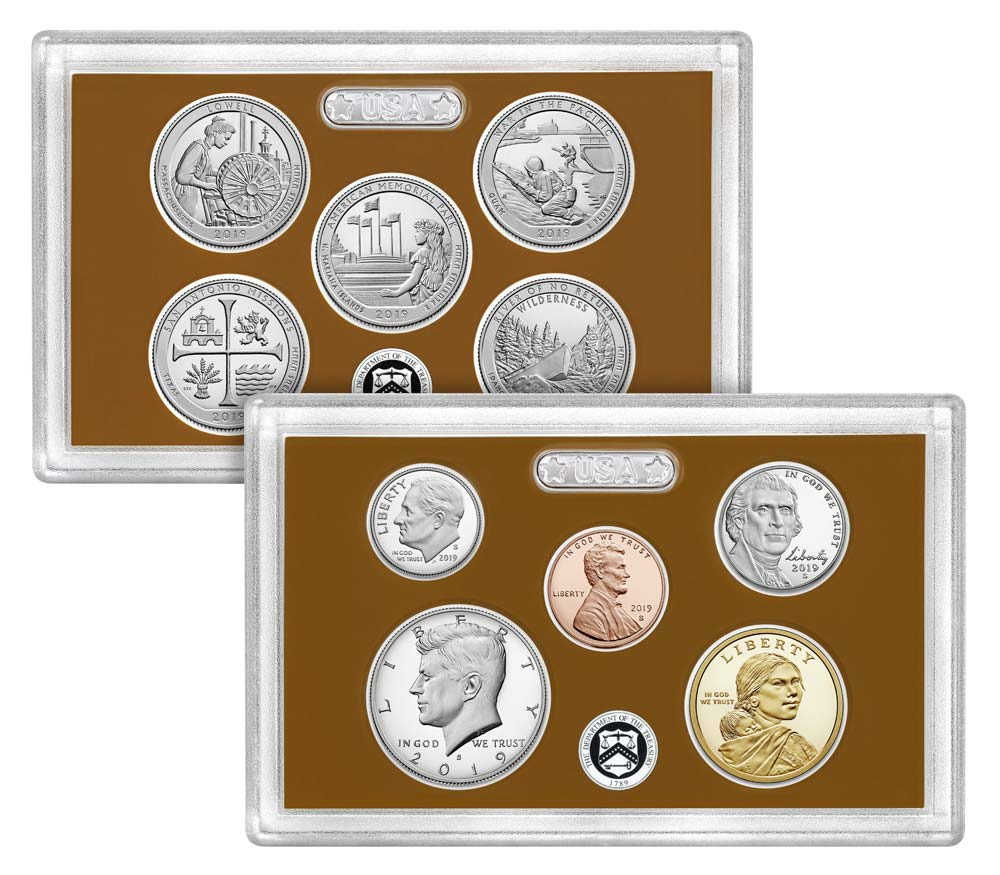
2019 Proof Set

The United States Mint Proof Set, commonly known as the Proof Set in the United States, is a set of proof coins sold by the United States Mint. The proof set is popular with coin collectors as it is a way to collect examples of United States coinage in proof condition.

== Standard proof sets (since 1936) ==
=== Pre-war proof sets (1936–1942) ===
In 1936, the US Mint produced proof coinage for collectors for the first time since 1916, when the mint had shut down proof production due to lack of interest from collectors. Like previous proof coinage, the new coins could be bought individually, but unlike previous coins, they were also offered as a set. Proof cents and nickels produced in early 1936 had a satin finish, which was unpopular with collectors as it closely resembled the standard circulation strike finish. Therefore, later 1936 cents and nickels featured the mirror-like "brilliant" finish used on the other coins of the set.

Halfway through 1942, following the outbreak of World War II, the composition of the nickel temporarily changed from cupronickel to 35% silver. Only the cupronickel version was included in the 1942 proof set, but a proof silver nickel (identified by the P mint mark on the reverse) was sold separately later that year. Later that year proof coinage was discontinued as the Mint was busy striking millions of medals for military awards.

Pre-war proof sets
Year	1¢	5¢	10¢	25¢	50¢	Total face value	Mintage
1936	Lincoln cent (P)	Buffalo nickel (P)	Mercury dime (P)	Washington quarter (P)	Walking Liberty half dollar (P)	$0.91	>3,837
1937	(P)	(P)	(P)	(P)	(P)	$0.91	>5,542
1938	(P)	Jefferson nickel (P)	(P)	(P)	(P)	$0.91	>8,045
1939	(P)	(P)	(P)	(P)	(P)	$0.91	>8,795
1940	(P)	(P)	(P)	(P)	(P)	$0.91	>11,246
1941	(P)	(P)	(P)	(P)	(P)	$0.91	>15,287
1942	(P)	(P)	(P)	(P)	(P)	$0.91	>21,120

=== Post-war proof sets (1950–1964) ===
Proof coinage production continued in 1950, although the mint no longer sold proof coins individually. Because of this, mintages for all proof coins in a year were the same.

1964 was the final year that the Philadelphia Mint produced proof sets. Then, starting the next year, through 1967, all mints produced coins without mint marks, as a shortage of coins was blamed on coin collectors. No proof sets or uncirculated mint sets were produced by the mint in those years, and instead "Special Mint Sets" containing circulation coins featuring a satin finish were sold to collectors. Although these sets were neither proof sets nor true uncirculated sets, they are collected by proof set collectors to complete their "yearly" proof set collections.

Post-war proof sets
Year	1¢	5¢	10¢	25¢	50¢	Total face value	Mintage
1950	Lincoln cent (P)	Jefferson nickel (P)	Roosevelt dime (P)	Washington quarter (P)	Franklin half dollar (P)	$0.91	51,386
1951	(P)	(P)	(P)	(P)	(P)	$0.91	57,500
1952	(P)	(P)	(P)	(P)	(P)	$0.91	81,980
1953	(P)	(P)	(P)	(P)	(P)	$0.91	128,800
1954	(P)	(P)	(P)	(P)	(P)	$0.91	233,300
1955	(P)	(P)	(P)	(P)	(P)	$0.91	378,200
1956	(P)	(P)	(P)	(P)	(P)	$0.91	669,384
1957	(P)	(P)	(P)	(P)	(P)	$0.91	1,247,952
1958	(P)	(P)	(P)	(P)	(P)	$0.91	875,652
1959	(P)	(P)	(P)	(P)	(P)	$0.91	1,149,291
1960	(P)	(P)	(P)	(P)	(P)	$0.91	1,691,602
1961	(P)	(P)	(P)	(P)	(P)	$0.91	3,028,244
1962	(P)	(P)	(P)	(P)	(P)	$0.91	3,218,019
1963	(P)	(P)	(P)	(P)	(P)	$0.91	3,075,645
1964	(P)	(P)	(P)	(P)	Kennedy half dollar (P)	$0.91	3,950,762

=== San Francisco proof sets (1968–present) ===
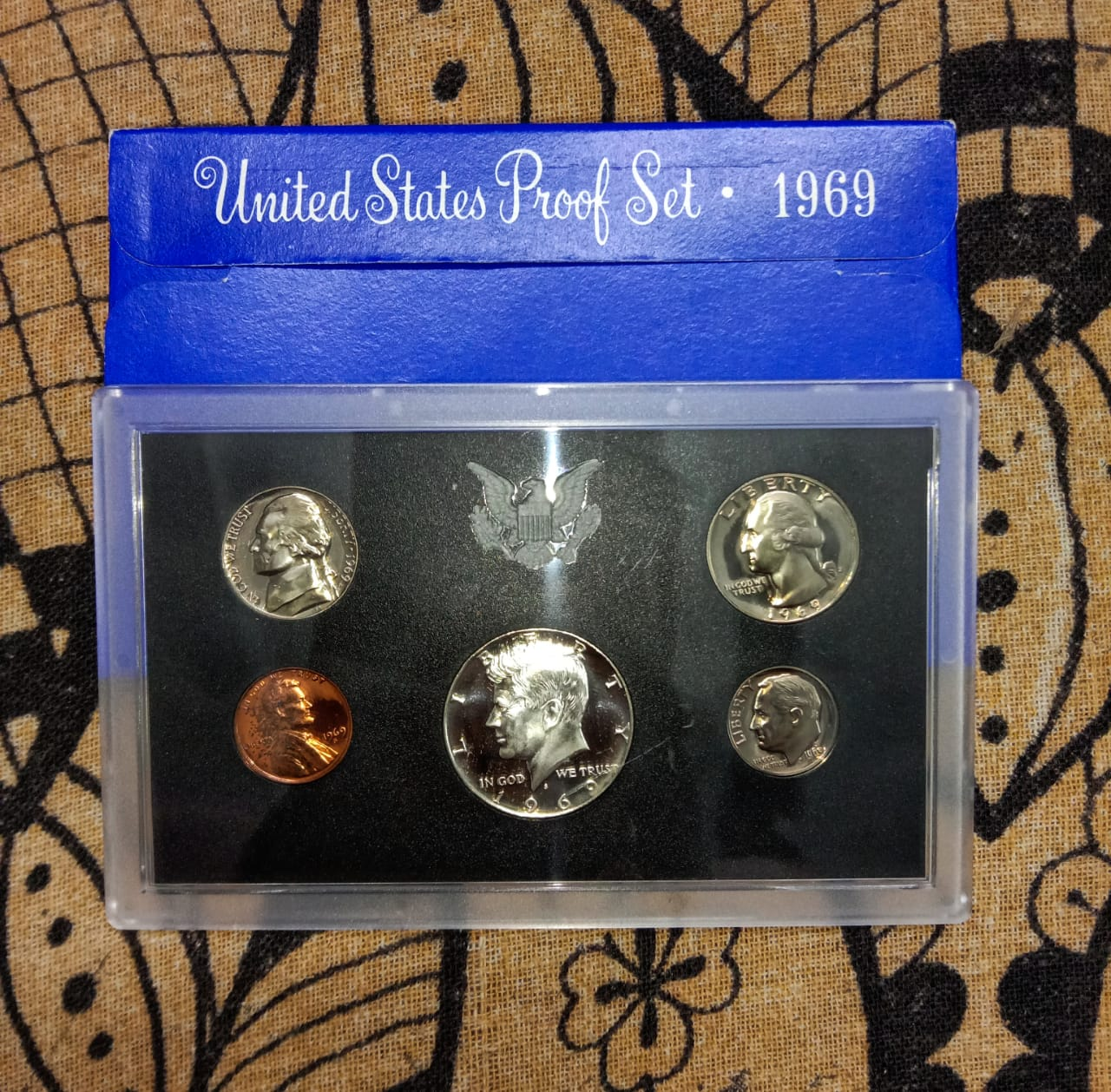
A 1969 United States Mint proof set of 5 coins including 40% silver Kennedy half dollar

In 1968, the mint started producing coins with mint marks again. Proof sets were once again produced also, with production of proof coins being taken over by the San Francisco Mint. Therefore, most post-1968 proof coins feature the S mint mark (error coins that lack the mint mark exist, and some special edition proof coins were produced by the Philadelphia and West Point Mints). Since 1975, San Francisco has only struck coins for collectors and investors, with the proof set being its main product (one major exception is the Susan B. Anthony dollar, produced 1979–1981).

In 1973, the dollar coin made its debut in the proof set in the form of the Eisenhower dollar. This coin proved unpopular in circulation and was discontinued in favor of the Susan B. Anthony dollar in 1979, which was also unpopular and also discontinued in 1981. The 1982 proof set contained a Department of the Treasury token in place of the dollar. It wasn't until 2000 that the dollar made a comeback in the proof set as the gold-colored Sacagawea dollar. Another dollar coin to be included in the proof set was the Presidential dollar, which was introduced in 2007 and produced alongside the Sacagawea dollar. Although popular with collectors, the dollar coin once again proved unpopular in circulation and was discontinued for circulation after 2011. As of 2019, however, the Sacagawea dollar continues to be available in the proof set (the Presidential $1 coin program ended in 2016).

Both the 1975 and 1976 proof sets contained the Bicentennial quarters, half dollars, and dollars featuring the double date 1776–1976. This was due to the fact that the mint did not produce those coins dated 1975, and the bicentennial coins were produced both years.

From 1999 through 2008, five 50 State quarters were included in the mint set each year. In 2004 and 2005, the Westward Journey nickels were also included in the set, adding an extra nickel in both sets. The 2009 proof set contained the highest number of coins and the highest combined face value ($7.19) of any proof set as of 2019, containing the four Lincoln Bicentennial cents (with a special composition of 95% copper), all six District of Columbia and United States Territories quarters, five dollar coins, and the standard nickel, dime, and half dollar. In 2019, a penny featuring the W mint mark (indicating that it was minted at West Point Mint) was included in the mint set, this was the first time a penny featured the mint mark. The same was done with the nickel in 2020.

San Francisco proof sets
Year	1¢	5¢	10¢	25¢	50¢	$1	Other	Total face value	Mintage
1968	Lincoln cent S	Jefferson nickel S	Roosevelt dime S	Washington quarter S	Kennedy half dollar S	–	–	$0.91	3,041,506
1969	S	S	S	S	S	–	–	$0.91	2,934,631
1970	S	S	S	S	S	–	–	$0.91	2,632,810
1971	S	S	S	S	S	–	–	$0.91	3,220,733
1972	S	S	S	S	S	–	–	$0.91	3,260,996
1973	S	S	S	S	S	Eisenhower dollar S	–	$1.91	2,760,339
1974	S	S	S	S	S	S	–	$1.91	2,612,568
1975	S	S	S	S	S	S	–	$1.91	2,845,450
1976	S	S	S	S	S	S	–	$1.91	4,149,730
1977	S	S	S	S	S	S	–	$1.91	3,251,152
1978	S	S	S	S	S	S	–	$1.91	3,127,781
1979	S	S	S	S	S	Susan B. Anthony dollar S	–	$1.91	3,677,175
1980	S	S	S	S	S	S	–	$1.91	3,554,806
1981	S	S	S	S	S	S	–	$1.91	4,063,083
1982	S	S	S	S	S	–	Department of the Treasury token	$0.91	3,857,479
1983	S	S	S	S	S	–	–	$0.91	3,138,765
1984	S	S	S	S	S	–	–	$0.91	2,748,430
1985	S	S	S	S	S	–	–	$0.91	3,362,821
1986	S	S	S	S	S	–	–	$0.91	2,411,180
1987	S	S	S	S	S	–	–	$0.91	3,792,233
1988	S	S	S	S	S	–	–	$0.91	3,031,287
1989	S	S	S	S	S	–	–	$0.91	3,009,107
1990	S	S	S	S	S	–	–	$0.91	2,793,433
1991	S	S	S	S	S	–	–	$0.91	2,610,833
1992	S	S	S	S	S	–	–	$0.91	2,675,618
1993	S	S	S	S	S	–	–	$0.91	2,337,819
1994	S	S	S	S	S	–	–	$0.91	2,308,701
1995	S	S	S	S	S	–	–	$0.91	2,010,384
1996	S	S	S	S	S	–	–	$0.91	1,695,244
1997	S	S	S	S	S	–	–	$0.91	1,975,000
1998	S	S	S	S	S	–	–	$0.91	2,086,507
1999	S	S	S	50 State quarters: Delaware S Pennsylvania S New Jersey S Georgia S Connecticut S	S	–	–	$1.91	2,543,401
2000	S	S	S	Massachusetts S Maryland S South Carolina S New Hampshire S Virginia S	S	Sacagawea dollar S	–	$2.91	3,082,572
2001	S	S	S	New York S North Carolina S Rhode Island S Vermont S Kentucky S	S	S	–	$2.91	2,294,909
2002	S	S	S	Tennessee S Ohio S Louisiana S Indiana S Mississippi S	S	S	–	$2.91	2,319,766
2003	S	S	S	Illinois S Alabama S Maine S Missouri S Arkansas S	S	S	–	$2.91	2,172,684
2004	S	Peace Medal S Keelboat S	S	Michigan S Florida S Texas S Iowa S Wisconsin S	S	S	–	$2.96	1,789,488
2005	S	American Bison S Ocean in View S	S	California S Minnesota S Oregon S Kansas S West Virginia S	S	S	–	$2.96	2,275,000
2006	S	S	S	Nevada S Nebraska S Colorado S North Dakota S South Dakota S	S	S	–	$2.91	2,000,428
2007	S	S	S	Montana S Washington S Idaho S Wyoming S Utah S	S	Sacagawea S Presidential dollars: George Washington S John Adams S Thomas Jefferson S James Madison S	–	$6.91	1,702,116
2008	S	S	S	Oklahoma S New Mexico S Arizona S Alaska S Hawaii S	S	Sacagawea S James Monroe S John Quincy Adams S Andrew Jackson S Martin Van Buren S	–	$6.91	1,382,017
2009	Birthplace S Formative Years S Professional Life S Presidency S	S	S	DC and US Territories quarters: District of Columbia S Puerto Rico S Guam S American Samoa S US Virgin Islands S Northern Mariana Islands S	S	Sacagawea S William Henry Harrison S John Tyler S James K. Polk S Zachary Taylor S	–	$7.19	1,482,502
2010	S	S	S	America the Beautiful quarters: Hot Springs National Park S Yellowstone National Park S Yosemite National Park S Grand Canyon National Park S Mount Hood National Forest S	S	Sacagawea S Millard Fillmore S Franklin Pierce S James Buchanan S Abraham Lincoln S	–	$6.91	1,103,950
2011	S	S	S	Gettysburg National Park S Glacier National Park S Olympic National Park S Vicksburg National Park S Chickasaw Recreation Area S	S	Sacagawea S Andrew Johnson S Ulysses S. Grant S Rutherford B. Hayes S James A. Garfield S	–	$6.91	1,098,835
2012	S	S	S	El Yunque National Forest S Chaco Culture National Historical Park S Acadia National Park S Hawaii Volcanoes National Park S Denali National Park S	S	Sacagawea S Chester Arthur S Grover Cleveland (1st term) S Benjamin Harrison S Grover Cleveland (2nd term) S	–	$6.91	794,002
2013	S	S	S	White Mountain National Forest S Perry's Victory International Peace Memorial S Great Basin National Park S Fort McHenry National Monument S Mount Rushmore National Memorial S	S	Sacagawea S William McKinley S Theodore Roosevelt S William Howard Taft S Woodrow Wilson S	–	$6.91	802,460
2014	S	S	S	Great Smoky Mountains National Park S Shenandoah National Park S Arches National Park S Great Sand Dunes National Park S Everglades National Park S	S	Sacagawea S Warren G. Harding S Calvin Coolidge S Herbert Hoover S Franklin D. Roosevelt S	–	$6.91	714,661
2015	S	S	S	Homestead National Monument of America S Kisatchie National Forest S Blue Ridge Parkway S Bombay Hook National Wildlife Refuge S Saratoga National Historical Park S	S	Sacagawea S Harry S. Truman S Dwight D. Eisenhower S John F. Kennedy S Lyndon B. Johnson S	–	$6.91	662,854
2016	S	S	S	Shawnee National Forest S Cumberland Gap National Historical Park S Harpers Ferry National Historical Park S Theodore Roosevelt National Park S Fort Moultrie S	S	Sacagawea S Richard M. Nixon S Gerald R. Ford S Ronald Reagan S	–	$5.91	595,184
2017	S	S	S	Effigy Mounds National Monument S Frederick Douglass National Historic Site S Ozark National Scenic Riverways S Ellis Island S George Rogers Clark National Historical Park S	S	Sacagawea dollar S	–	$2.91	568,678
2018	S	S	S	Pictured Rocks National Lakeshore S Apostle Islands National Lakeshore S Voyageurs National Park S Cumberland Island National Seashore S Block Island National Wildlife Refuge S	S	S	–	$2.91	517,053
2019	S, W	S	S	Lowell National Historical Park S American Memorial Park S War in the Pacific National Historical Park S San Antonio Missions National Historical Park S Frank Church River of No Return Wilderness S	S	S	–	$2.92	601,327
2020	S	S, W	S	National Park of American Samoa S Weir Farm National Historic Site S Salt River Bay National Historical Park and Ecological Preserve S Marsh-Billings-Rockefeller Historical National Park S Tallgrass Prairie National Preserve S	S	S	–	$2.96	464,658
2021	S	S	S	Tuskegee Airmen National Historic Site S Washington Crossing the Delaware S	S	S	–	$2.16	512,603
2022	S	S	S	American Women quarters: Maya Angelou S Dr. Sally Ride S Wilma Mankiller S Nina Otero-Warren S Anna May Wong S	S	S	–	$2.91	399,949
2023	S	S	S	Bessie Coleman S Edith Kanak'ole S Eleanor Roosevelt S Jovita Idar S Maria Tallchief S	S	S	–	$2.91	331,314

== Silver proof sets (1976; since 1992) ==
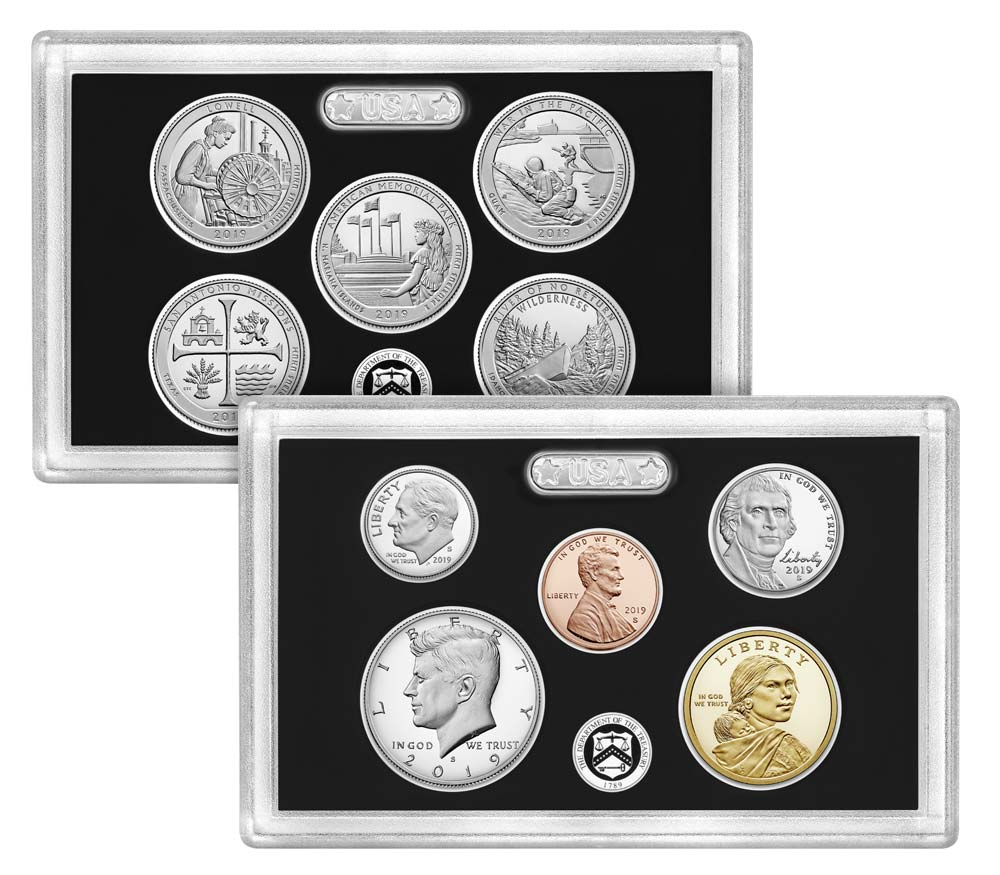
2019 Silver Proof Set

In 1976, the mint released a proof set containing the Bicentennial quarter, half dollar, and dollar struck in 40% silver.

The Silver Proof set became a standard product of the United States Mint in 1992, containing a dime, quarter, and half dollar composed of 90% silver. The compositions for the penny, nickel, and dollar (introduced to the set in 2000) remained the same as in the standard proof sets. In 2019, the purity of the silver coins was changed to 99.9%.

The 2019 Silver Proof Set contains a "West Point" penny with a reverse cameo finish. Similarly, the 2020 set includes a reverse cameo "West Point" nickel.

Silver proof sets
Year	1¢	5¢	10¢	25¢	50¢	$1	Total face value	Mintage
1976	–	–	–	Washington quarter S	Kennedy half dollar S	Eisenhower dollar S	$1.75	3,998,621
1992	Lincoln cent S	Jefferson nickel S	Roosevelt dime S	S	S	–	$0.91	1,009,586
1993	S	S	S	S	S	–	$0.91	570,213
1994	S	S	S	S	S	–	$0.91	636,009
1995	S	S	S	S	S	–	$0.91	549,878
1996	S	S	S	S	S	–	$0.91	623,655
1997	S	S	S	S	S	–	$0.91	605,473
1998	S	S	S	S	S	–	$0.91	638,134
1999	S	S	S	50 State quarters: Delaware S Pennsylvania S New Jersey S Georgia S Connecticut S	S	–	$1.91	804,565
2000	S	S	S	Massachusetts S Maryland S South Carolina S New Hampshire S Virginia S	S	Sacagawea dollar S	$2.91	965,421
2001	S	S	S	New York S North Carolina S Rhode Island S Vermont S Kentucky S	S	S	$2.91	889,697
2002	S	S	S	Tennessee S Ohio S Louisiana S Indiana S Mississippi S	S	S	$2.91	892,229
2003	S	S	S	Illinois S Alabama S Maine S Missouri S Arkansas S	S	S	$2.91	1,125,755
2004	S	Peace Medal S Keelboat S	S	Michigan S Florida S Texas S Iowa S Wisconsin S	S	S	$2.96	1,175,934
2005	S	American Bison S Ocean in View S	S	California S Minnesota S Oregon S Kansas S West Virginia S	S	S	$2.96	1,069,679
2006	S	S	S	Nevada S Nebraska S Colorado S North Dakota S South Dakota S	S	S	$2.91	1,054,008
2007	S	S	S	Montana S Washington S Idaho S Wyoming S Utah S	S	Sacagawea S Presidential dollars: George Washington S John Adams S Thomas Jefferson S James Madison S	$6.91	875,050
2008	S	S	S	Oklahoma S New Mexico S Arizona S Alaska S Hawaii S	S	Sacagawea S James Monroe S John Quincy Adams S Andrew Jackson S Martin Van Buren S	$6.91	763,887
2009	Birthplace S Formative Years S Professional Life S Presidency S	S	S	DC and US Territories quarters: District of Columbia S Puerto Rico S Guam S American Samoa S US Virgin Islands S Northern Mariana Islands S	S	Sacagawea S William Henry Harrison S John Tyler S James K. Polk S Zachary Taylor S	$7.19	697,365
2010	S	S	S	America the Beautiful quarters: Hot Springs National Park S Yellowstone National Park S Yosemite National Park S Grand Canyon National Park S Mount Hood National Forest S	S	Sacagawea S Millard Fillmore S Franklin Pierce S James Buchanan S Abraham Lincoln S	$6.91	585,414
2011	S	S	S	Gettysburg National Park S Glacier National Park S Olympic National Park S Vicksburg National Park S Chickasaw Recreation Area S	S	Sacagawea S Andrew Johnson S Ulysses S. Grant S Rutherford B. Hayes S James A. Garfield S	$6.91	574,175
2012	S	S	S	El Yunque National Forest S Chaco Culture National Historical Park S Acadia National Park S Hawaii Volcanoes National Park S Denali National Park S	S	Sacagawea S Chester Arthur S Grover Cleveland (1st term) S Benjamin Harrison S Grover Cleveland (2nd term) S	$6.91	395,443
2013	S	S	S	White Mountain National Forest S Perry's Victory International Peace Memorial S Great Basin National Park S Fort McHenry National Monument S Mount Rushmore National Memorial S	S	Sacagawea S William McKinley S Theodore Roosevelt S William Howard Taft S Woodrow Wilson S	$6.91	419,720
2014	S	S	S	Great Smoky Mountains National Park S Shenandoah National Park S Arches National Park S Great Sand Dunes National Park S Everglades National Park S	S	Sacagawea S Warren G. Harding S Calvin Coolidge S Herbert Hoover S Franklin D. Roosevelt S	$6.91	429,493
2015	S	S	S	Homestead National Monument of America S Kisatchie National Forest S Blue Ridge Parkway S Bombay Hook National Wildlife Refuge S Saratoga National Historical Park S	S	Sacagawea S Harry S. Truman S Dwight D. Eisenhower S John F. Kennedy S Lyndon B. Johnson S	$6.91	387,414
2016	S	S	S	Shawnee National Forest S Cumberland Gap National Historical Park S Harpers Ferry National Historical Park S Theodore Roosevelt National Park S Fort Moultrie S	S	Sacagawea S Richard M. Nixon S Gerald R. Ford S Ronald Reagan S	$5.91	369,849
2017	S	S	S	Effigy Mounds National Monument S Frederick Douglass National Historic Site S Ozark National Scenic Riverways S Ellis Island S George Rogers Clark National Historical Park S	S	S	$2.91	358,085
2018	S	S	S	Pictured Rocks National Lakeshore S Apostle Islands National Lakeshore S Voyageurs National Park S Cumberland Island National Seashore S Block Island National Wildlife Refuge S	S	S	$2.91	332,274
2019	S, W	S	S	Lowell National Historical Park S American Memorial Park S War in the Pacific National Historical Park S San Antonio Missions National Historical Park S Frank Church River of No Return Wilderness S	S	S	$2.92	412,508
2020	S	S, W	S	National Park S Weir Farm S Salt River Bay S Marsh-Billings-Rockefeller S Tallgrass Prairie S	S	S	$2.96	313,249
2021	S	S	S	Tuskegee Airmen National Historic Site S Washington Crossing the Delaware S	S	S	$2.16	300,816
2022	S	S	S	American Women quarters: Maya Angelou S Dr. Sally Ride S Wilma Mankiller S Nina Otero-Warren S Anna May Wong S	S	S	$2.91	245,919
2023	S	S	S	Bessie Coleman S Edith Kanak'ole S Eleanor Roosevelt S Jovita Idar S Maria Tallchief S	S	S	$2.91	172,094

=== Limited Edition silver proof sets (since 2012) ===
Since 2012, the San Francisco Mint issued special limited edition Silver Proof Sets containing only the silver coins of the standard set, plus a proof American Silver Eagle. The sets have a mintage limit of 50,000 each. No set was issued for 2015. Like the standard Silver Proof Set, all coins in the set are made with a composition of 99.9% starting in 2019.

Limited Edition silver proof sets
Year	10¢	25¢	50¢	$1	Total face value	Mintage (Limit)
2012	Roosevelt dime S	America the Beautiful quarters: El Yunque National Forest S Chaco Culture National Historical Park S Acadia National Park S Hawaii Volcanoes National Park S Denali National Park S	Kennedy half dollar S	American Silver Eagle W	$2.85	50,169
2013	S	White Mountain National Forest S Perry's Victory International Peace Memorial S Great Basin National Park S Fort McHenry National Monument S Mount Rushmore National Memorial S	S	W	$2.85	47,971
2014	S	Great Smoky Mountains National Park S Shenandoah National Park S Arches National Park S Great Sand Dunes National Park S Everglades National Park S	S	W	$2.85	42,830
2016	S	Shawnee National Forest S Cumberland Gap National Historical Park S Harpers Ferry National Historical Park S Theodore Roosevelt National Park S Fort Moultrie S	S	W	$2.85	49,412
2017	S	Effigy Mounds National Monument S Frederick Douglass National Historic Site S Ozark National Scenic Riverways S Ellis Island S George Rogers Clark National Historical Park S	S	S	$2.85	48,901
2018	S	Pictured Rocks National Lakeshore S Apostle Islands National Lakeshore S Voyageurs National Park S Cumberland Island National Seashore S Block Island National Wildlife Refuge S	S	S	$2.85	44,231
2019	S	Lowell National Historical Park S American Memorial Park S War in the Pacific National Historical Park S San Antonio Missions National Historical Park S Frank Church River of No Return Wilderness S	S	S	$2.85	48,418
2020	S	National Park S Weir Farm S Salt River Bay S Marsh-Billings-Rockefeller S Tallgrass Prairie S	S	S	$2.85	49,506

== Prestige proof sets (1983–1997) ==
In 1983, the mint released a special mint set containing a commemorative dollar coin. This set, known as the Prestige proof set, was sold every year until 1997 (except 1985, when no commemorative coins were produced) containing a commemorative dollar coin and sometimes a commemorative half dollar. Each set included Lincoln cent, Jefferson nickel, Roosevelt dime, Washington quarter, and Kennedy half dollar proof coins.

Prestige proof sets
Image			Year	Commemorative Half Dollar	Commemorative Dollar	Total face value	Mintage
Obverse	Reverse	Box	Year	Commemorative Half Dollar	Commemorative Dollar	Total face value	Mintage
			1983	none	1984 Summer Olympics Dollar	$1.91	140,361
			1984	none	1984 Summer Olympics Dollar	$1.91	316,680
			1986	Statue of Liberty Half Dollar	Statue of Liberty Dollar	$2.41	599,317
			1987	none	United States Constitution Bicentennial Dollar	$1.91	435,495
			1988	none	1988 Summer Olympics Dollar	$1.91	231,661
			1989	U.S. Congress Bicentennial Half Dollar	U.S. Congress Bicentennial Dollar	$2.41	211,807
			1990	none	Eisenhower Centennial Dollar	$1.91	506,126
			1991	Mount Rushmore Anniversary Half Dollar	Mount Rushmore Anniversary Dollar	$2.41	256,954
			1992	1992 Summer Olympics Half Dollar	1992 Summer Olympics Dollar	$2.41	183,293
			1993	Bill of Rights Half Dollar	Bill of Rights Dollar	$2.41	224,045
			1994	1994 World Cup Half Dollar	1994 World Cup Dollar	$2.41	175,893
			1995	Civil War Battlefield Half Dollar	Civil War Battlefield Dollar	$2.41	107,112
			1996	Centennial Olympics Half Dollar (Soccer)	Centennial Olympics Dollar (Rowing)	$2.41	55,000
			1997	none	Botanic Garden Dollar	$1.91	80,000

== Other proof sets ==
=== 50 State Quarters Proof Set ===
With the launch of the 50 State Quarters Program in 1999, the Mint began marketing proof sets of just the five quarters released in the given year. These sets are essentially a reduced version of the regular issue proof sets and the packaging maintained the same blue color scheme, but came in a smaller box and different certificate of authenticity. This collection ceased with the resolution of the program in 2008. These sets are usually denoted as the 5-piece sets from a given year. All issues were produced at the San Francisco Mint.

=== 50 State Quarters Silver Proof Set ===
The 50 State Quarters Proof Sets produced with the five quarters produced that year in 90% silver and again were the same as the year's Silver Proof Set but in a reduced red packaging and unique certificate of authenticity. All issues were produced at the San Francisco Mint.

=== District of Columbia and U.S. Territories Quarters Proof Set ===
Upon completion of the 50 State Quarters Program, it was decided to honor Washington D.C., and the U.S. Overseas Territories in a similar manner. The District of Columbia and United States Territories Quarters allowed for the minting of six designs in 2009 and these were sold as a set. All were produced at the San Francisco Mint.

=== America the Beautiful Quarters Proof Set ===
The America the Beautiful Quarters program began in 2010 as a continuation of the 50 State Quarters and D.C. and Territories programs, allowing each state a representation in the nation's coinage. These sets are reduced versions of the United States Mint Proof Set and the packaging maintains the same burnt-orange color scheme, but came in a smaller box and different certificate of authenticity. All issues were produced at the San Francisco Mint.

=== America the Beautiful Quarters Silver Proof Set ===
The 50 State Quarters Proof Sets are also produced in 90% silver and again are the same as the year's Silver Proof Set but in a reduced navy-blue packaging and unique certificate of authenticity. All issues were produced at the San Francisco Mint.

=== Presidential $1 Coin Proof Set ===
With the launch of the Presidential $1 Coin Program, four dollar coins have been released each year since 2007 - each depicting a serving U.S. President. This set is the sleeve of dollar coins from regular issue mint sets on its own with reduced packaging and a different certificate of authenticity. The program ended in 2016 when all eligible presidents had been honored.

=== 50th Anniversary San Francisco Silver Reverse Proof Set ===
A special Silver Proof Set was issued by the San Francisco Mint in 2018. This set contained the same coins as the standard 2018 Silver Proof Set, but with a reverse cameo finish, and had a maximum authorized mintage of 200,000 sets.

=== American Innovation Dollar Proof Set and Reverse Proof Set ===
After the 2018 introduction of the American Innovation dollars program, the Mint began releasing proof sets containing one example of each coin minted that year. The first set, released in December 2018, contained only one coin, the introductory piece, while future sets contain each of the four coins issued that year.

The Reverse Proof coins were originally released as individually packaged coins, starting with the introductory coin, (released in August 2019), and continuing for the next two years, with two 2019-S coins going on sale in 2020 and one 2020-S coin going on sale in 2021. Starting with the 2021 coins, the individually packed coins were discontinued in favor of a four-coin Reverse Proof set, released in November that year.

== Other modern proof coins ==
Some special proof coins were not included in any of the above-mentioned proof sets, but were sold individually by the mint or in commemorative sets.

Other modern proof coins
Coin	Mintage	Notes
1994-P matte Jefferson nickel	167,703	
1997-P matte Jefferson nickel	25,000 (25,000 authorized)	
1998-S matte Kennedy half dollar	62,000	
1999-P Susan B. Anthony dollar	740,000	
2014-P Kennedy half dollar	198,268 (225,000 authorized)	Included in the 50th Anniversary Kennedy half dollar set
2014-W reverse cameo Kennedy half dollar	219,173 (225,000 authorized)	Included in the 50th Anniversary Kennedy half dollar set
2014-W Kennedy half dollar (gold)	69,319 (75,000 authorized)	Struck in .999 24 karat gold
2015-P reverse cameo Roosevelt dime	74,430 (75,000 authorized)	Included in a mint set containing the March of Dimes commemorative dollar
2015-W Roosevelt dime (silver)	74,430 (75,000 authorized)	Included in a mint set containing the March of Dimes commemorative dollar
