= Krawczewicz =

Krawczewicz is a Polish surname. Notable people with the surname include:

- Paweł Krawczewicz (1907–1945), Polish religious leader
- William Krawczewicz (born 1967), American illustrator and medalist
