= Eisenhower Centennial silver dollar =

1990 US commemorative coin

Eisenhower Centennial dollar
- United States
- Value: 1 U.S. Dollar
- Mass: 26.73 g
- Diameter: 38.1 mm (1.500 in)
- Thickness: 2.58 mm
- Edge: Reeded
- Composition: 90% Ag; 10% Cu
- Years of minting: 1990
- Mintage: 1,144,461 Uncirculated 241,669 Proof
- Mint marks: P, W. Under LIBERTY on the obverse.

Obverse
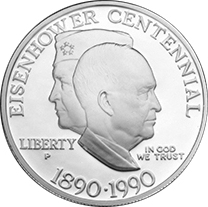
- Design: Dwight D. Eisenhower as a general facing left and Eisenhower as President facing right
- Designer: John Mercanti
- Design date: 1990

Reverse
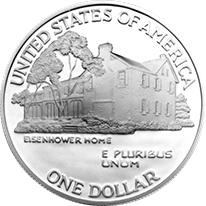
- Design: Eisenhower's home
- Designer: Marcel Jovine
- Design date: 1990

The Eisenhower Commemorative silver dollar is a commemorative coin issued by the United States Mint in 1990 to commemorate the centennial of the birth of Dwight D. Eisenhower. The obverse of the coin was designed by Mint artist John Mercanti and depicts a dual portrait of Eisenhower as both a general and a president. The reverse of the coin was designed by Marcel Jovine and depicts Eisenhower's retirement home in Gettysburg, Pennsylvania. A surcharge was placed on the sale of the dollars to reduce the national debt.

The dollar coin was proposed by the Dwight David Eisenhower Society and legislation was introduced into Congress in 1987. After concerns were raised from the Mint over sales expectations and production demands, the bill was reintroduced with changes in 1988. After passing, the Mint held a competition among invited artists to create a design for the coin.

The uncirculated and proof dollar coins were struck at the West Point Mint and the Philadelphia Mint, respectively. The uncirculated dollar was the first silver coin struck at the West Mint Point. The coins became available for purchase in January 1990. The decision to commemorate Eisenhower only 12 years after the Eisenhower dollar ended production was questioned by numismatists. Collectors also criticized the depiction of Eisenhower's retirement home on the reverse. Since mintage ended the coin has been common and inexpensive to collect.

== Background ==
Dwight David Eisenhower was born on October 14, 1890, in Denison, Texas. He graduated from the United States Military Academy at West Point, New York, in 1915. During World War II, Eisenhower was the Supreme Commander of the Allied Forces in Europe and planned the invasion of Normandy on June 6, 1944. He served as the president of Columbia University after the war and was elected as the 34th President of the United States, serving from 1953 to 1961. Eisenhower died on March 28, 1969. He was depicted on the circulating Eisenhower dollar from 1971 to 1978. In 1990, celebrations were held across the United States for the centennial of Eisenhower's birth, including at his retirement home in Gettysburg, Pennsylvania.

== Legislation ==
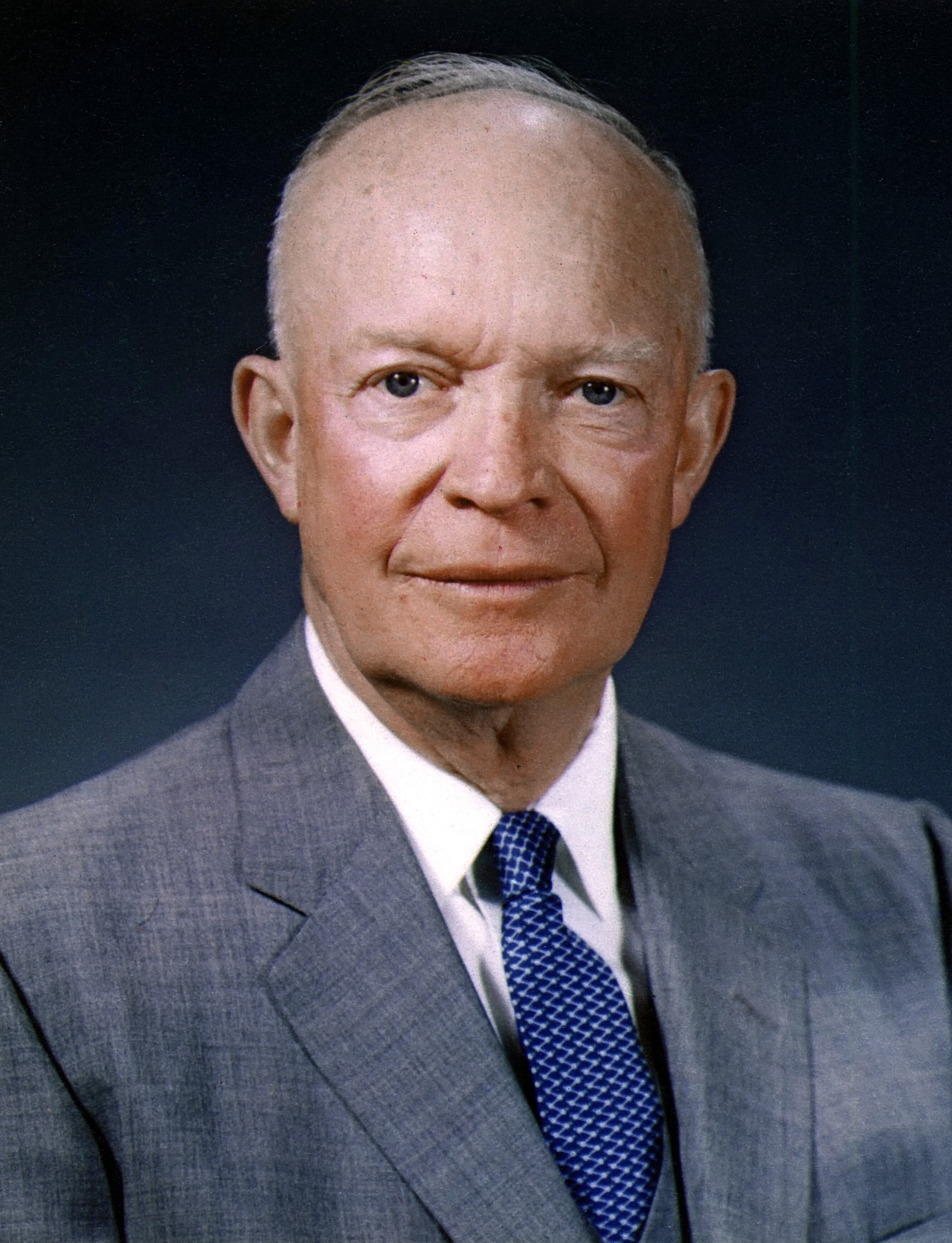
Dwight D. Eisenhower

The United States Mint had stopped minting commemorative coins in 1954 after interest from coin collectors began waning. The Treasury Department stated that commemorative coins had been abused by special interest groups. In the 1980s, newly appointed Mint Director Donna Pope expressed an openness to strike new commemorative coins. The Mint began striking commemorative coins again in 1982 with the George Washington 250th Anniversary half dollar.

H.R. 3654, titled the "Dwight David Eisenhower Commemorative Coin Act of 1987", was introduced in the House of Representatives by William Goodling of Pennsylvania on November 18, 1987. Goodling stated that the coin was suggested by the Dwight David Eisenhower Society in Gettysburg, where Eisenhower's retirement home is located. The bill allowed the United States Mint to strike up to 10 million silver dollars commemorating the centennial of the birth of Dwight D. Eisenhower in 1990. The bill also stated a $9 surcharge on sales of the coin were to be used to reduce the national debt and that both the proof and uncirculated varieties were to be minted at one mint facility. The bill was sent to the House Committee on Banking, Finance and Urban Affairs. A similar bill was introduced in the Senate by Senator John Heinz on December 19 but received no further attention.

As progress stalled on H.R. 3654, Senator Bob Dole added an amendment to another bill in the Senate authorizing the Congressional Bicentennial commemorative coins. The amendment also authorized a coin commemorating the centennial of Eisenhower's birth, with a maximum mintage of 10 million. The Senate approved that bill with amendments by unanimous consent on June 15, 1988. However, the House approved the bill without the amendment, as the amendment lacked enough sponsors under House rules. Goodling expressed disappointment that the amendment was not approved, and asked Frank Annunzio of Illinois, the chairman of the Subcommittee on Consumer Affairs and Coinage, to consider his bill, H.R. 3654. The Senate approved the Congressional Bicentennial coins bill on July 12 without the amendment for the Eisenhower coin.

The Subcommittee discussed H.R. 3654 during a hearing on September 14. Annunzio commended Goodling for getting 251 sponsors on the bill, which received unanimous support from the subcommittee members, Senator Dole, and Representative Pat Roberts of Kansas. At the hearing, Mint Director Pope raised concerns that the Mint would be unable to sell 10 million coins, and suggested that the mintage be lowered to 4 million and the surcharge be lowered from $9 to $7 to meet sales expectations. Pope also wanted to change a provision specifying that the coins were to be struck at only one mint, as the Mint only struck proof coins at the San Francisco Mint and planned on striking the uncirculated coins at the Philadelphia Mint. The subcommittee amended the bill with all of Pope's suggestions. Later that day, Dole introduced S. 2789, titled the "Dwight David Eisenhower Commemorative Coin Act of 1988", in the Senate which also included Pope's suggestions. The Senate bill passed the same day.

The House passed the amended H.R. 3654 by voice vote on September 16, yet the bill was tabled. Annunzio asked the House to instead pass the similar Senate bill, S. 2789, which it did, also by voice vote. President Ronald Reagan signed the bill into law (Pub. L. 100–467) on October 3, 1988.

== Design competition ==
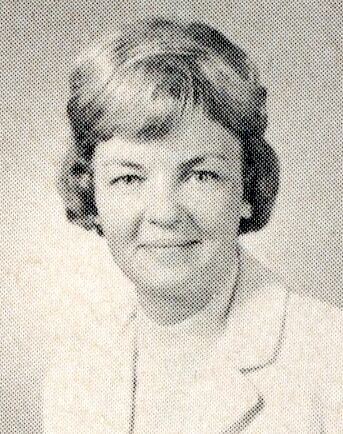
Mint Director Donna Pope

The Commission of Fine Arts (CFA) suggested to Pope that the design for the coin should be selected from a competition of artists selected by the United States Mint. The Mint invited five artists, as well as its own sculptor-engravers, to submit designs, although one invited artist, William Woodward, did not submit any designs. Designs were submitted from Eugene Daub, Curtis Kauffmann, Patricia Lewis Verani and Marcel Jovine, as well as Mint employees Edgar Z. Steever IV, Maria Kirby-Smith, John Mercanti and Elizabeth Jones. Pope and US Treasurer Katherine D. Ortega did not like any of the designs submitted by the Mint's own artists. At a trade meeting, Pope was asked if the coin would depict Eisenhower as a general or president; she thought depicting both would be fitting. Pope asked Mercanti to create a design featuring Eisenhower in both roles, which he sketched over a weekend.

The CFA was scheduled to discuss the designs on July 26, 1989, however, the Mint withdrew from the meeting for unknown reasons. Secretary of the Treasury Nicholas F. Brady approved Mercanti's design for the obverse and Jovine's design for the reverse on August 7, 1989. CFA member Diane Wolf was critical of the choice to approve designs before consulting the CFA. Brady claimed that he selected the final designs in consultation with the CFA and the Eisenhower family. During a later CFA meeting on September 21, the commission approved of the designs and recommended a minor change to the lettering for the motto E PURIBUS UNUM on the reverse.

== Design ==
The obverse design from Mercanti depicts a right-facing Eisenhower profile as president superimposed over a left-facing Eisenhower profile as a five-star general. The inscription along the border of the coin reads EISENHOWER CENTENNIAL with the dates 1890-1990 below the busts. In the left field, the mint mark appears under the word LIBERTY. In the right field, the motto IN GOD WE TRUST appears. Mercanti's initials JM appear on the presidential bust of Eisenhower, on the jacket near LIBERTY.

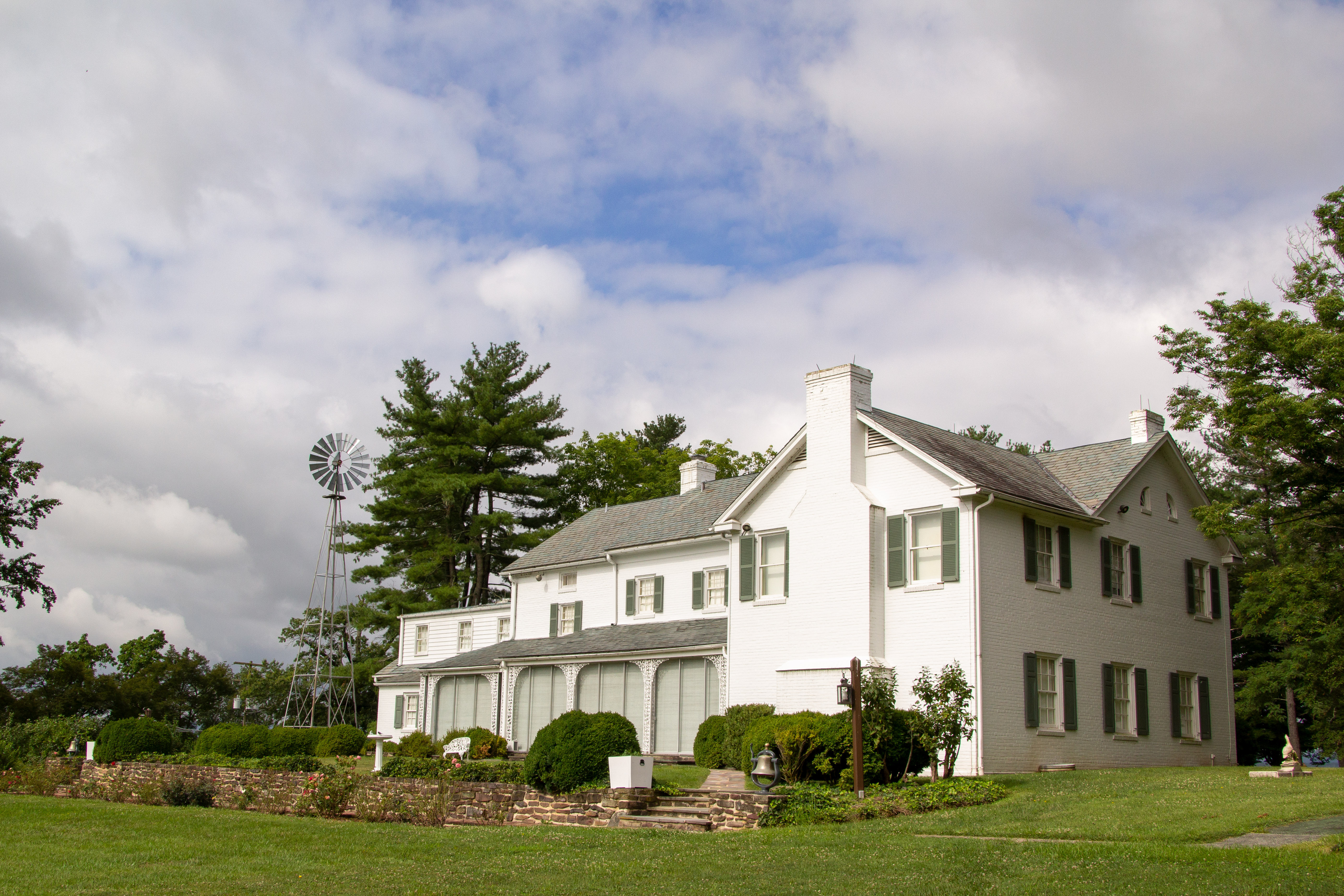
The Eisenhower house in Gettysburg, Pennsylvania

The reverse design from Jovine was modeled by Chester Young Martin. The design depicts Eisenhower's retirement home at Gettysburg, where he did not spend much time. The words EISENHOWER HOME are depicted below the left side of the home. Above the home reads UNITED STATES OF AMERICA. In the lower right field appears the motto E PLURIBUS UNUM. Jovine's initials appear on the left side of the shrubbery and Martin's initials appear on the right side of the shrubbery. The denomination ONE DOLLAR runs along the bottom at the rim.

== Production and release ==
The uncirculated dollars were struck at the West Point Mint and proof dollars were struck at the Philadelphia Mint. It was the first time the West Point Mint had struck silver coins; this broke from the previous decade, where the West Point Mint only struck gold commemorative coins and proof coinage was struck at the San Francisco Mint. Numismatist Q. David Bowers notes that a mailing sent by the Mint in January 1990 advertised that the Philadelphia Mint and the Gettysburg home are both in Pennsylvania, and that Eisenhower attended the United States Military Academy in West Point, New York.

A launch ceremony for the coins was held in Gettysburg on January 16, 1990, where coins were presented to US Treasurer Catalina Vasquez Villalpando and Goodling. The plaster casts used for the design were presented to Goodling, who subsequently gave them to the Gettysburg National Military Park. The Mint had begun accepting mail orders on January 15 and began shipping orders out on February 5. The coin could also be purchased through some retail stores, coin dealers, financial institutions, and a toll-free number connected to the Mint sales department. The proof and uncirculated strikes were sold individually; a proof coin was also included in the 1990 Prestige Proof Set. The coins were offered in dark green velvet cases. While originally stated to be only available during 1990, a Mint official stated they were still accepting orders on in March 1991.

=== Reception ===
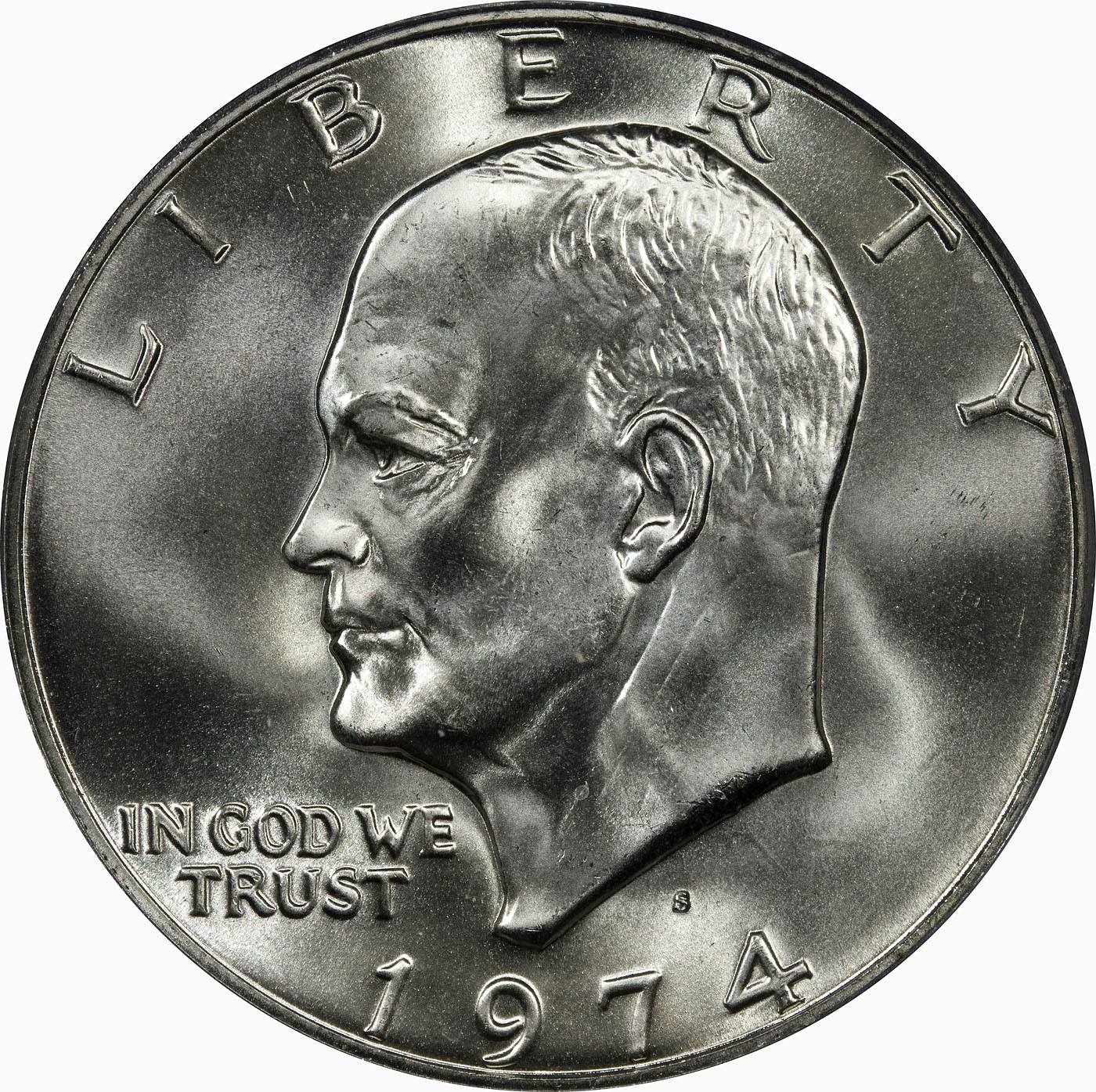
The Eisenhower dollar, which had been struck as recently as 1978, had also commemorated Eisenhower

In 1988, after legislation passed authorizing the coin, numismatic columnist Ed Reiter was critical of the coin noting that minting of the Eisenhower dollar only ended in 1978. Reiter also questioned the inclusion of Eisenhower's Gettysburg home, as it was "a building almost no one will recognize". These concerns were shared by Littleton Coin Company vice president Rick Sundman and coin dealer Anthony Swiatek.

After the coin's release, Reiter published several perspectives of the coin, including from former Leningrad Mint artist Alex Shagin and art historian Cornelius Vermeule. Shagin called the home a "shapeless, sloppy composition" and compared the dual portraits of Eisenhower to the Roman god Janus, while Vermeule praised the depiction of the home on the reverse and called the coin "innovative, imaginative, and very good". Reiter found the coin unsatisfactory and criticized the inclusion of the Eisenhower home as a requirement in the authorizing legislation, stating Goodling "handcuffed artists" from making a more creative design. Bowers notes that while the home on the reverse is called the EISENHOWER HOME, it does not distinguish that it was Eisenhower's retirement home rather than his birthplace.

In 2016, Bowers said that superb examples of the coin are common and inexpensive. Swiatek, in his 2012 book on United States commemoratives, states that collectors should only obtain the coin "for the joy of ownership".

=== Sales and production figures ===
The coin was sold at pre-issue prices through February 28; afterwards, prices increased. The Mint announced on March 21 that over one million silver dollars were sold. At the end of production, mintage totaled 1,144,461 proof coins and 241,669 uncirculated coins.

Eisenhower Centennial silver dollar sales
Sales option	Pre-issue price	Regular price	Mint and mint mark	Authorized mintage	Total sales	Notes
Uncirculated dollar	$23	$26	West Point (W)	4,000,000	241,669	
Proof dollar	$25	$29	Philadelphia (P)	4,000,000	638,335	
Prestige Proof Set	$42	$46	Philadelphia (P)	4,000,000	506,126	Packaged alongside other proof coinage

== See also ==
- United States commemorative coins
- List of United States commemorative coins and medals (1990s)
- List of memorials to Dwight D. Eisenhower
