= 1992 Olympic commemorative coins =

Series of commemorative coins

The 1992 Olympic commemorative coins are a series of commemorative coins which were issued by the United States Mint in 1992.

== Legislation ==
The 1992 Olympic Commemorative Coin Act (Pub. L. 101–406) authorized the production of three coins, a clad half dollar, a silver dollar, and a gold half eagle. Congress authorized the coins to support the training of American athletes participating in the 1992 Olympic Games in Barcelona, Spain. The act allowed the coins to be struck in both proof and uncirculated finishes. The coins were released January 17, 1992.

== Designs ==
=== Half Dollar ===
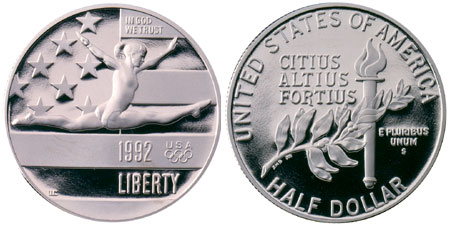
1992 Olympic half dollar obverse (left) and reverse (right)

The obverse design of the 1992 Olympic commemorative half dollar, designed by William Cousins, features a gymnast in motion with the American flag and the Olympic rings in the background. The reverse, designed by Steven Bieda, features an olive branch crossing the Olympic torch.

=== Dollar ===
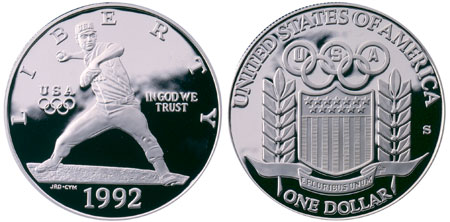
1992 Olympic silver dollar obverse (left) and reverse (right)

The obverse of the 1992 Olympic commemorative dollar, designed by John Deecken, captures a pitcher throwing a baseball to home plate along with the Olympic Rings. The reverse of the coin, designed by Marcel Jovine, features the Olympic Rings, olive branches, and stars and stripes.

=== Half eagle ===
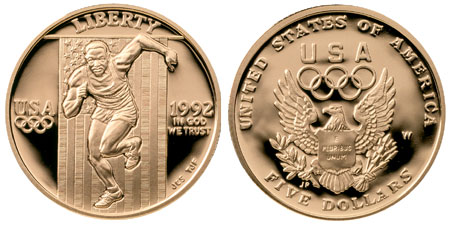
1992 Olympic gold half eagle obverse (left) and reverse (right)

The obverse of the 1992 Olympic commemorative half eagle, designed by Jim Sharpe, features an Olympic sprinter in a burst of speed with the American flag in the background. The reverse of the coin, designed by T. James Ferrell, features a design that unites two majestic symbols, the Olympic Rings, and the American Bald Eagle.

== Specifications ==
Half Dollar

- Display Box Color: Maroon
- Edge: Reeded
- Weight: 11.34 grams
- Diameter: 30.61 millimeters; 1.205 inches
- Composition: 91.67% Copper; 8.33% Nickel (Cupronickel)

Dollar

- Display Box Color: Maroon
- Edge: Reeded
- Weight: 26.730 grams; 0.8594 troy ounce
- Diameter: 38.10 millimeters; 1.50 inches
- Composition: 90% Silver, 10% Copper

Half Eagle

- Display Box Color: Maroon
- Edge: Reeded
- Weight: 8.359 grams; 0.2687 troy ounce
- Diameter: 21.59 millimeters; 0.850 inch
- Composition: 90% Gold, 3.6% Silver, 6.4% Copper

== See also ==
- United States commemorative coins
- List of United States commemorative coins and medals (1990s)
- 1984 Summer Olympics commemorative coins
- 1988 Olympic commemorative coins
