= 1988 Olympic commemorative coins =

Series of commemorative coins

The 1988 Olympic commemorative coins are a series of commemorative coins which were issued by the United States Mint in 1988.

== Legislation ==
The 1988 Olympic Commemorative Coin Act (Pub. L. 100–141) authorized the production of two coins, a silver dollar and a gold half eagle. Congress authorized the coins to support the training of American athletes participating in the 1988 Olympic Games. The act allowed the coins to be struck in both proof and uncirculated finishes.

== Designs ==
=== Dollar ===
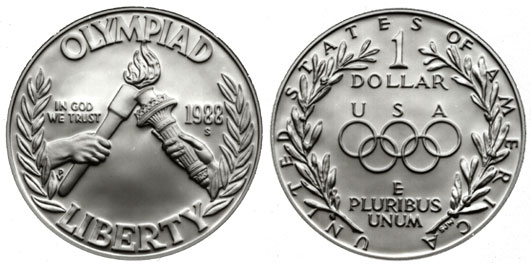
1988 Olympic silver dollar obverse (left) and reverse (right)

The obverse of the 1988 Olympic commemorative dollar, designed by Patrica L. Verani, features Lady Liberty's torch and the Olympic torch merging into a single symbolic flame with an olive branch encircling the torches. The reverse, designed by Sheryl J. Winter, features the five-ring logo of the U.S. Olympic Committee, framed by a pair of olive branches.

=== Half eagle ===
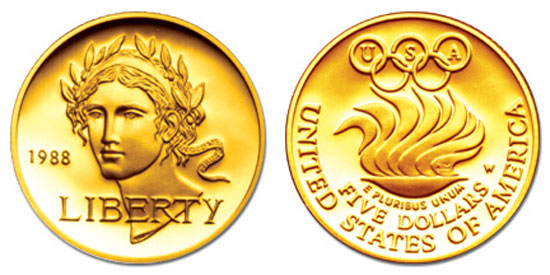
1988 Olympic gold half eagle obverse (left) and reverse (right)

The obverse of the 1988 Olympic commemorative half eagle, designed by Elizabeth Jones, features Nike, Greek goddess of victory, in a wreath of olive leaves. The reverse of the coin, designed by Marcel Jovine features the Olympic flame.

== Specifications ==
Dollar

- Display Box Color: Maroon
- Edge: Reeded
- Weight: 26.730 grams; 0.8594 troy ounce
- Diameter: 38.10 millimeters; 1.50 inches
- Composition: 90% Silver, 10% Copper

Half Eagle

- Display Box Color: Maroon
- Edge: Reeded
- Weight: 8.359 grams; 0.2687 troy ounce
- Diameter: 21.59 millimeters; 0.850 inch
- Composition: 90% Gold, 3.6% Silver, 6.4% Copper

== See also ==
- United States commemorative coins
- List of United States commemorative coins and medals (1980s)
- 1984 Summer Olympics commemorative coins
- 1992 Olympic commemorative coins
