= United States Constitution Bicentennial coins =

United States commemorative coins issued in 1987

The United States Constitution Bicentennial commemorative coins are a series of commemorative coins which were issued by the United States Mint in 1987.

== Legislation ==
The Bicentennial of the Constitution Coins and Medals Act (Pub. L. 99–582) authorized the production of two coins, a silver dollar and a gold half eagle, to commemorate the bicentennial of the signing of the US Constitution. The act allowed the coins to be struck in both proof and uncirculated finishes.

== Designs ==
=== Dollar ===
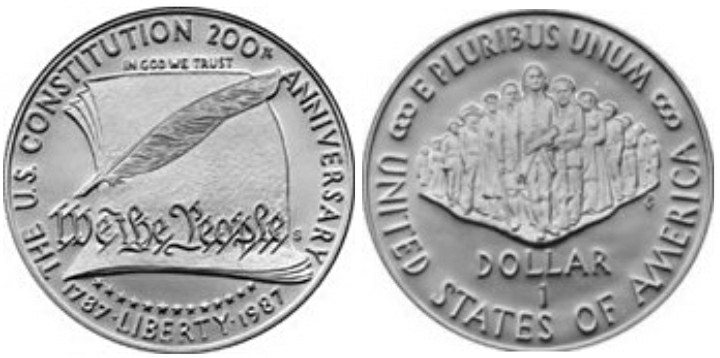
US Constitution Bicentennial dollar obverse (left) and reverse (right)

The obverse of the United States Constitution Bicentennial dollar, designed by Patricia L. Verani, features a sheaf of parchments, a quill pen, and the words "We the People". The reverse, also designed by Verani, portrays a cross section of Americans from various periods of history.

=== Half eagle ===
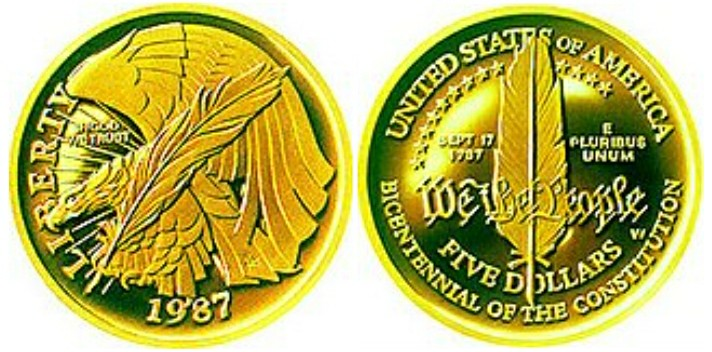
US Constitution Bicentennial half eagle obverse (left) and reverse (right)

The obverse of the United States Constitution Bicentennial half eagle, designed by Marcel Jovine, features a modernistic, highly stylized eagle holding a quill pen. The reverse, also by Jovine, features a quill pen with the words, "We the People".

== Specifications ==
Dollar

- Display Box Color: Navy Blue
- Edge: Reeded
- Weight: 26.730 grams; 0.8594 troy ounce
- Diameter: 38.10 millimeters; 1.50 inches
- Composition: 90% Silver, 10% Copper

Half Eagle

- Display Box Color: Navy Blue
- Edge: Reeded
- Weight: 8.359 grams; 0.2687 troy ounce
- Diameter: 21.59 millimeters; 0.850 inch
- Composition: 90% Gold, 3.6% Silver, 6.4% Copper

== See also ==
- United States commemorative coins
- List of United States commemorative coins and medals (1980s)
- Bill of Rights commemorative coins
