= List of United States commemorative coins (1980s) =

== 1982 ==
=== Non-circulating coins ===
Face value	Coin	Obverse design	Reverse design	Composition	Mintage	Available	Obverse	Reverse
50¢	George Washington 250th Anniversary half dollar	George Washington riding a horse	Mount Vernon with eagle	Ag 90%, Cu 10%	Authorized: 10,000,000 (max) Uncirculated: 2,210,458 D Proof: 4,894,044 S	1982 – 1985		

== 1983 ==
=== Non-circulating coins ===
Face value	Coin	Obverse design	Reverse design	Composition	Mintage	Available	Obverse	Reverse
$1	1984 Summer Olympics dollar	The Discobolus of Myron	Head of an eagle	Ag 90%, Cu 10%	Authorized: 50,000,000 (max 1983–1984 total) Uncirculated: 294,543 P 174,014 D 174,014 S Proof: 1,577,025 S	1983 – 1984		

== 1984 ==
=== Non-circulating coins ===
Face value	Coin	Obverse design	Reverse design	Composition	Mintage	Available	Obverse	Reverse
$1	1984 Summer Olympics dollar	The pair of life-sized bronze nude statues of male and female athletes atop Olympic Gateway in the Los Angeles Memorial Coliseum	Eagle	Ag 90%, Cu 10%	Uncirculated: 217,954 P 116,675 D 116,675 S Proof: 1,801,210 S	1984		
$10	1984 Summer Olympics eagle	Olympic torch runners	Eagle clutching an olive branch in its right claw and arrows in its left claw	Au 90%, Ag 6%, Cu 4%	Authorized: 2,000,000 (max) Uncirculated: 75,886 W Proof: 33,309 P 34,533 D 48,551 S 381,085 W	1984		

== 1986 ==
=== Non-circulating coins ===
Face value	Coin	Obverse design	Reverse design	Composition	Mintage	Available	Obverse	Reverse
50¢	Statue of Liberty half dollar	Side view of Liberty and back view of immigrant ship steaming into New York harbor	Immigrant family with their belongings on the threshold of America	Cu 92%, Ni 8%	Authorized: 25,000,000 (max) Uncirculated: 928,008 D Proof: 6,925,627 S	1986		
$1	Statue of Liberty dollar	Liberty with the Ellis Island Immigration Center in the background	Liberty's torch with inscriptions	Ag 90%, Cu 10%	Authorized: 10,000,000 (max) Uncirculated: 723,635 P Proof: 6,414638 S	1986		
$5	Statue of Liberty half eagle	Close up of the Statue of Liberty	An eagle in flight	Au 90%, Ag 6%, Cu 4%	Authorized: 500,000 (max) Uncirculated: 95,248 W Proof: 404,013 W	1986		

== 1987 ==
=== Non-circulating coins ===
Face value	Coin	Obverse design	Reverse design	Composition	Mintage	Available	Obverse	Reverse
$1	United States Constitution Bicentennial dollar	A sheaf of parchments, a quill pen, and the words "We the People"	Human figures representing the cultural and social diversity of America	Ag 90%, Cu 10%	Authorized: 10,000,000 (max) Uncirculated: 451,629 P Proof: 2,747,116 S	1987		
$5	United States Constitution Bicentennial half eagle	Eagle holding a quill pen	The words "We the People" and a quill pen	Au 90%, Ag 6%, Cu 4%	Authorized: 1,000,000 (max) Uncirculated: 214,225 W Proof: 651,659 W	1987		

== 1988 ==
=== Non-circulating coins ===
Face value	Coin	Obverse design	Reverse design	Composition	Mintage	Available	Obverse	Reverse
$1	1988 Summer Olympics dollar	The torches of Lady Liberty and the Olympics merging into one flame	US Olympic Committee logo	Ag 90%, Cu 10%	Authorized: 10,000,000 (max) Uncirculated: 191,368 D Proof: 1,359,366 S	1988		
$5	1988 Summer Olympics half eagle	Nike	Olympic flame	Au 90%, Ag 6%, Cu 4%	Authorized: 1,000,000 (max) Uncirculated: 62,913 W Proof: 281,456 W	1988		

== 1989 ==
=== Non-circulating coins ===
Face value	Coin	Obverse design	Reverse design	Composition	Mintage	Available	Obverse	Reverse
50¢	U.S. Congress Bicentennial half dollar	Bust of the Statue of Freedom	Capitol Building	Cu 92%, Ni 8%	Authorized: 4,000,000 (max) Uncirculated: 163,753 D Proof: 762,198 S	1989		
$1	U.S. Congress Bicentennial dollar	Statue of Freedom	Mace of the House of Representatives	Ag 90%, Cu 10%	Authorized: 3,000,000 (max) Uncirculated: 135,203 D Proof: 762,198 S	1989		
$5	U.S. Congress Bicentennial half eagle	The Capital Dome	Eagle from the canopy of the Old Senate Chamber	Au 90%, Ag 6%, Cu 4%	Authorized: 1,000,000 (max) Uncirculated: 46,899 W Proof: 164,690 W	1989		
