= George Washington half eagle =

Commemorative coin

George Washington gold $5
- United States
- Value: $5 U.S. dollars
- Mass: 8.359 g (0.27 troy oz)
- Diameter: 21.59 mm (.850 in)
- Edge: Reeded
- Composition: 90% Au; 10% Alloy
- Gold: 0.24 troy oz
- Years of minting: 1999
- Mint marks: W

Obverse
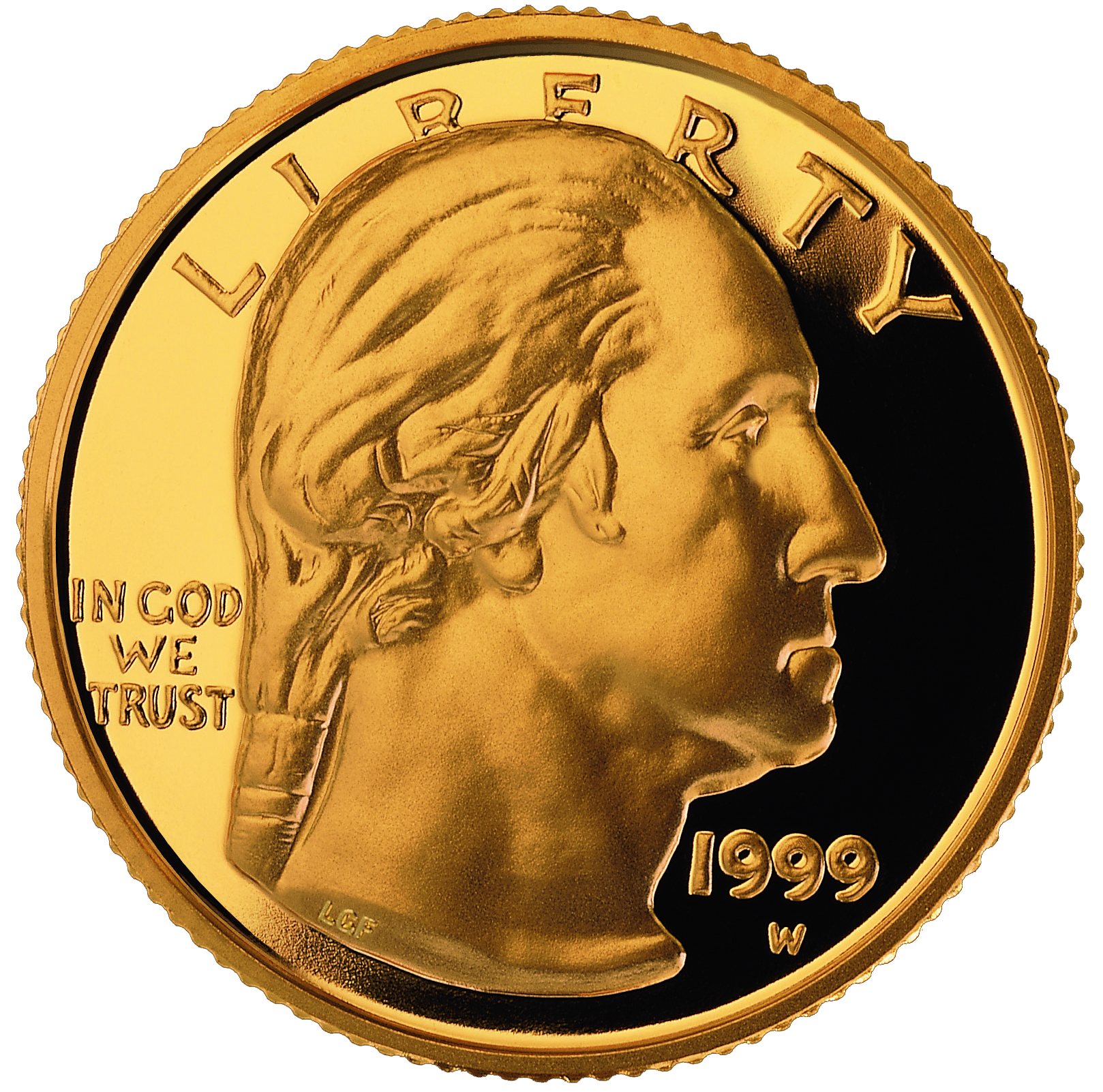
- Design: Profile of George Washington
- Designer: Laura Gardin Fraser

Reverse
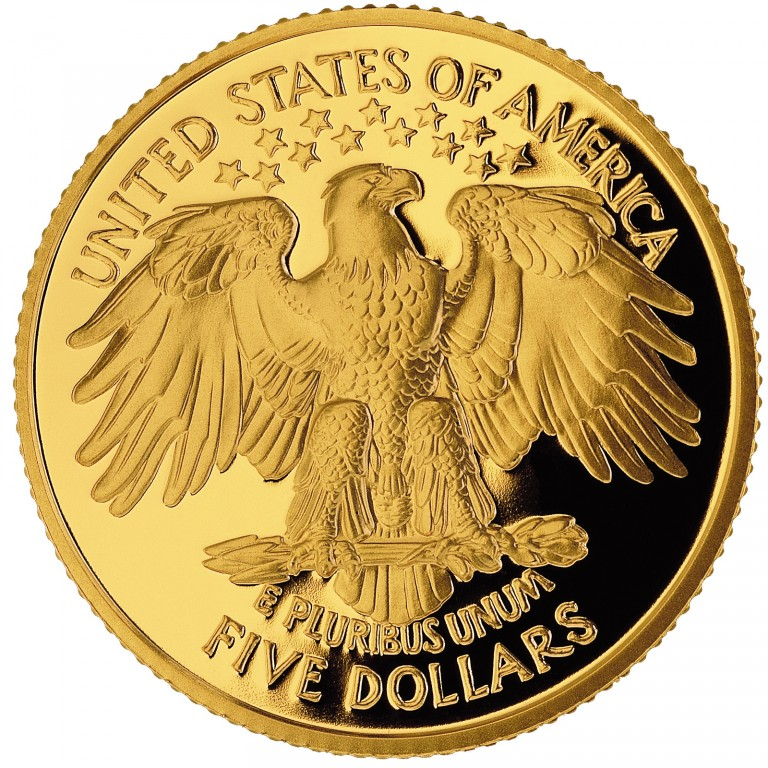
- Design: Traditional view of a bald eagle
- Designer: Laura Gardin Fraser

The George Washington gold half eagle is a commemorative coin issued by the United States Mint in 1999, the 200th anniversary of Washington's death.

== Legislation ==
The George Washington Commemorative Coin Act of 1996 (Pub. L. 104–329 (text) (PDF)) authorized the production of a commemorative $5 gold coin (half eagle) to commemorate the life of George Washington, leader of the Continental Army during the American Revolutionary War and the nation's first commander-in-chief. The act allowed the coins to be struck in both proof and uncirculated finishes.

== Design ==
The obverse of the George Washington gold half eagle, designed by Laura Gardin Fraser, bears a right-facing portrait of Washington. The reverse, also designed by Fraser, features the Heraldic Eagle with outspread wings. Fraser's obverse was later used as the obverse for the coins of the circulating American Women quarters program.

== Specifications ==
- Display Box: Maroon
- Edge: Reeded
- Weight: 8.359 grams; 0.27 troy ounce
- Diameter: 21.59 millimeters; 0.850 inch
- Composition: 90% Gold, 10% Alloy

== See also ==
- List of United States commemorative coins and medals (1990s)
- United States commemorative coins
- George Washington 250th Anniversary half dollar
