= Civil War Battlefields commemorative coins =

U.S. commemorative coin series

The Civil War Battlefields commemorative coins are a series of commemorative coins which were issued by the United States Mint in 1995.

== Legislation ==
The Civil War Battlefields Commemorative Coin Act of 1992 (Pub. L. 102–379) authorized the production of three coins, a clad half dollar, a silver dollar, and a gold half eagle, to commemorate the 100th anniversary of the beginning of the protection of Civil War battlefields. The act allowed the coins to be struck in both proof and uncirculated finishes. The coins were released on March 31, 1995.

== Designs ==
=== Half Dollar ===
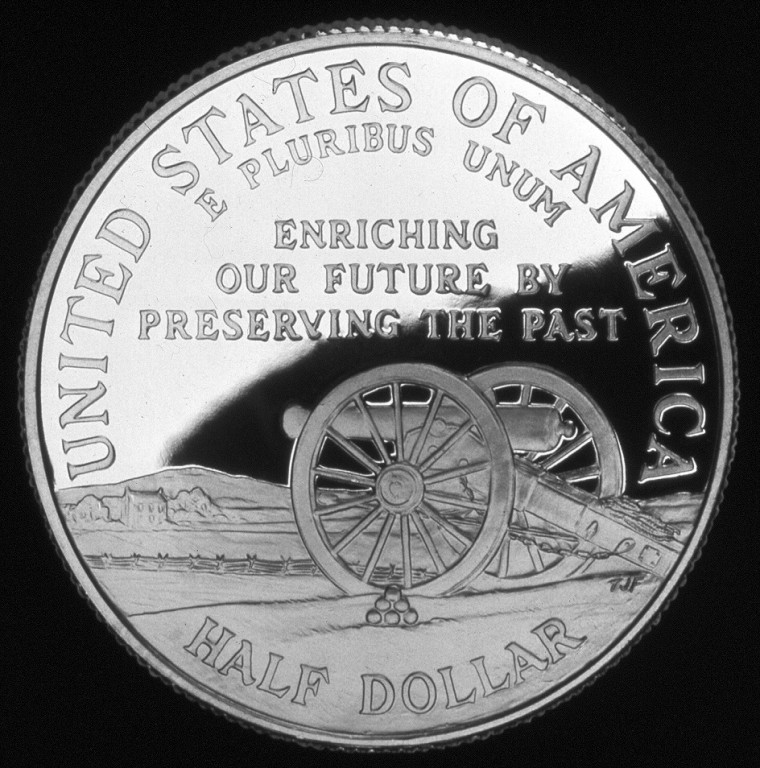
1995 Civil War Battlefield half dollar reverse

The obverse of the Civil War Battlefields commemorative half dollar, designed by Don Troiani, features a Civil War drummer boy and inscriptions. The reverse, designed by T. James Ferrell, features a battlefield scene.

=== Dollar ===
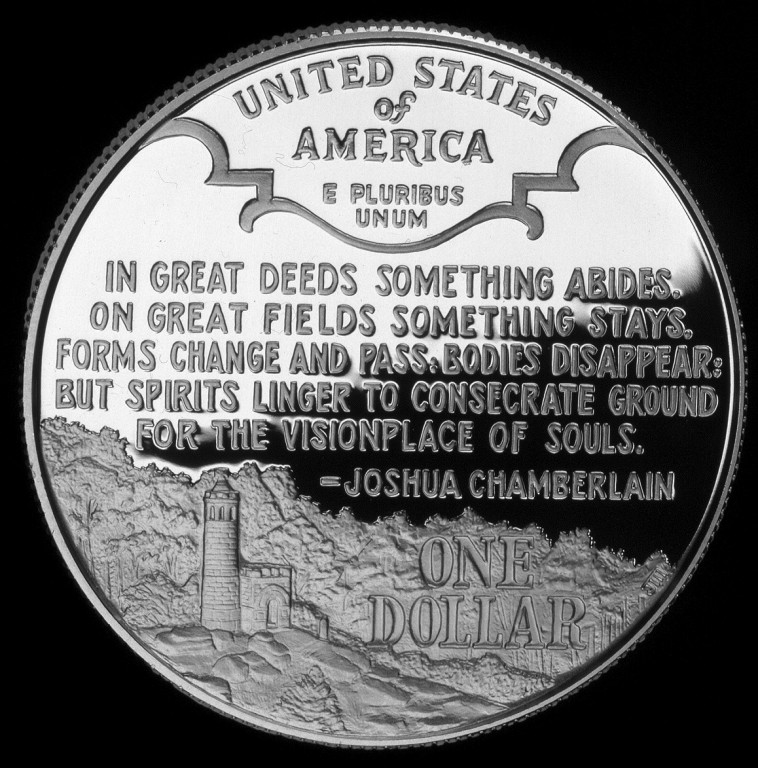
1995 Civil War Battlefield dollar reverse

The obverse of the Civil War Battlefields commemorative dollar, designed by Don Troiani, features an infantryman raising a canteen to the lips of a wounded foe. The reverse, designed by John Mercanti, features a quotation from Joshua Lawrence Chamberlain, the college professor from Maine who became one of the heroes of Gettysburg.

=== Half eagle ===
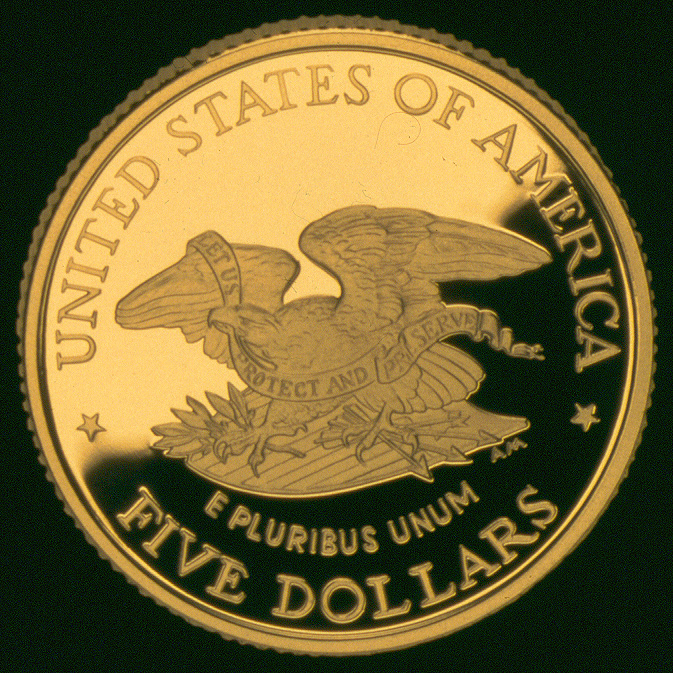
1995 Civil War Battlefield half eagle reverse

The obverse of the Civil War Battlefields commemorative half eagle, designed by Don Troiani, shows a Civil War bugler on horseback sounding out a call to the troops. The reverse, designed by Alfred Maletsky, features the image of a bald eagle holding a banner that reads "Let Us Protect and Preserve".

== Specifications ==
Half Dollar

- Display Box Color: Dark Green
- Edge: Reeded
- Weight: 11.34 grams
- Diameter: 30.61 millimeters; 1.205 inches
- Composition: 92% Copper, 8% Nickel

Dollar

- Display Box Color: Dark Green
- Edge: Reeded
- Weight: 26.730 grams; 0.8594 troy ounce
- Diameter: 38.10 millimeters; 1.50 inches
- Composition: 90% Silver, 10% Copper

Half Eagle

- Display Box Color: Dark Green
- Edge: Reeded
- Weight: 8.359 grams; 0.2687 troy ounce
- Diameter: 21.59 millimeters; 0.850 inch
- Composition: 90% Gold, 6% Silver, 4% Copper

== See also ==
- United States commemorative coins
- List of United States commemorative coins and medals (1990s)
- Battle of Gettysburg half dollar
- Battle of Antietam half dollar
- Stone Mountain Memorial half dollar
