= George Washington 250th Anniversary half dollar =

Commemorative coin

- United states
- Value: .50 US Dollar
- Mass: 12.50 g
- Diameter: 30.6 mm
- Edge: Reeded
- Composition: 90% Ag; 10% Cu
- Years of minting: 1982

Obverse
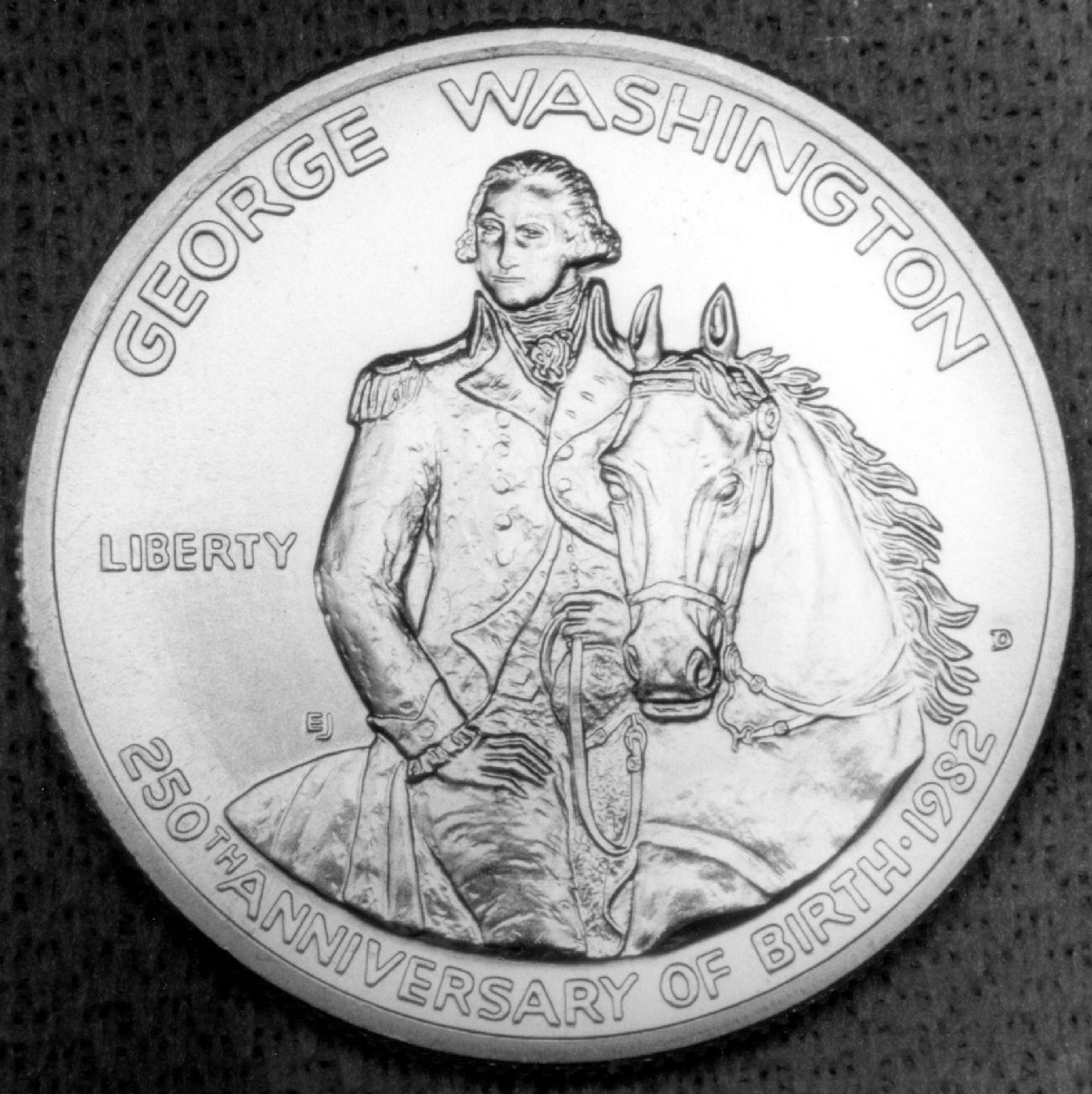
- Design: George Washington riding a horse
- Designer: Elizabeth Jones
- Design date: 1982

Reverse
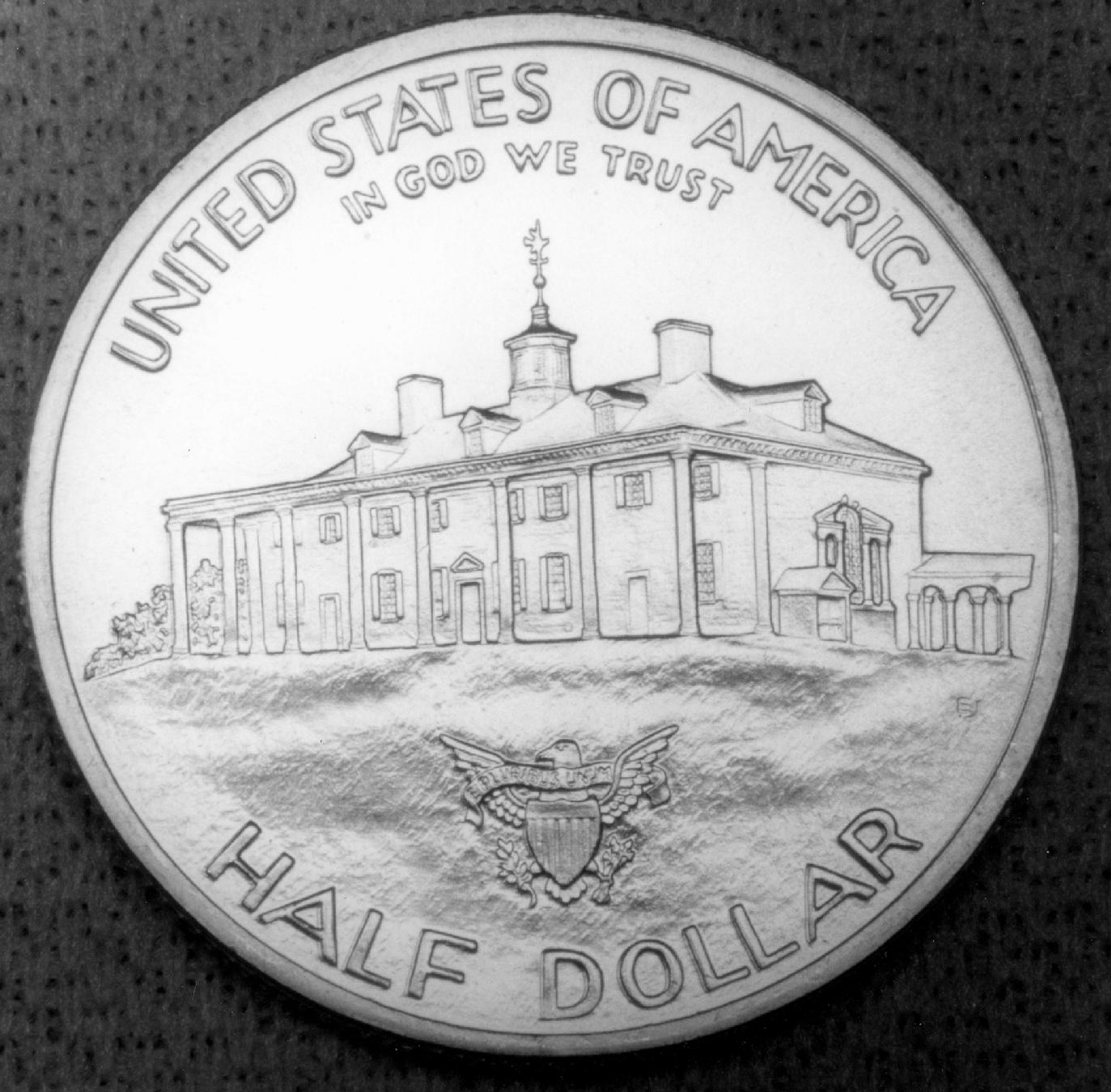
- Design: Mount Vernon with eagle
- Designer: Elizabeth Jones
- Design date: 1982

The George Washington 250th Anniversary half dollar is a commemorative coin that was issued by the United States Mint in 1982 to commemorate the 250th anniversary of the birth of George Washington. The coin was authorized by Pub. L. 97–104.

== History ==
The George Washington 250th Anniversary half dollar was the first modern United States commemorative coin. Production of traditional commemorative coins had previously ended in 1954 with the Carver-Washington half dollar.

== Production and sales ==
Public Law 97-104 authorized a total mintage of 10,000,000 coins. Two varieties of the coin were produced, one with a proof finish (struck at the San Francisco Mint with the "S" mint mark) and one with an uncirculated finish (struck at the Denver Mint with the "D" mint mark). A total of 4,894,044 proof and 2,210,458 uncirculated coins were produced and sold.

== See also ==
- List of United States commemorative coins and medals (1980s)
- United States commemorative coins
- George Washington half eagle
