= William Krawczewicz =

American coin designer (born 1967)

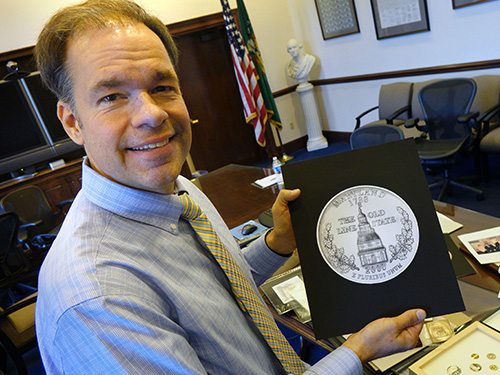
- Krawczewicz in 2015
- Born: William J. Krawczewicz; 1967 (age 58–59); Severna Park, Maryland, US
- Other name: "Dollar Bill"
- Occupations: Illustrator, medalist

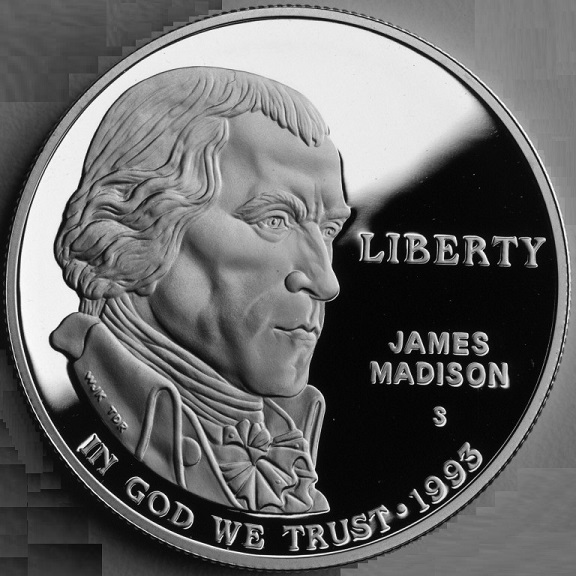
Obverse of the 1993 Bill of Right commemorative silver dollar, designed by Krawczewicz

William J. "Dollar Bill" Krawczewicz (born 1967) is an American illustrator and medalist.

== Biography ==
Krawczewicz was born in 1967, in Severna Park, Maryland. He graduated from the University of Maryland, College Park, and worked at the United States Mint. He later worked for the Bureau of Engraving and Printing (BEP) as a coin and banknote designer. As of 2007, he is one of three banknote designers working for the BEP.

He was the designer of the obverse of the 1993 Bill of Rights commemorative silver dollar. He was also the designer of the 2000 Maryland quarter, which was minted over 1.2 billion times. In 2017, some Maryland quarters were flown into space.

Krawczewicz is also a charcoal llustrator. He donated some of his works to the Maryland State Archives.
