= Bill of Rights commemorative coins =

Series of commemorative coins

The Bill of Rights commemorative coins are a series of commemorative coins which were issued by the United States Mint in 1993.

== Legislation ==
The James Madison-Bill of Rights Commemorative Coin Act (Pub. L. 102–281) authorized the production of three coins, a clad half dollar, a silver dollar, and a gold half eagle. Congress authorized the coins to commemorate the first ten amendments of the United States Constitution, known as the Bill of Rights. The act allowed the coins to be struck in both proof and uncirculated finishes. The coins were released January 22, 1993.

== Designs ==
=== Half Dollar ===
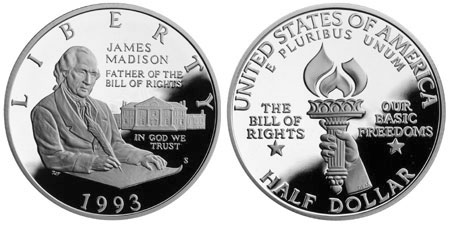
Bill of Rights half dollar obverse (left) and reverse (right)

The obverse of the Bill of Rights commemorative half dollar, designed by T. James Ferrell, features James Madison penning the Bill of Rights with Montpelier in the background. The reverse of the coin, designed by Dean McMullen, features the torch of freedom.

=== Dollar ===
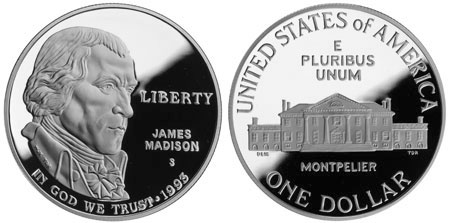
Bill of Rights silver dollar obverse (left) and reverse (right)

The obverse of the Bill of Rights commemorative dollar, designed by William Krawczewicz, features a portrait of James Madison. The reverse of the coin, designed by Dean McMullen, features James and Dolley Madison's Virginia home, Montpelier.

=== Half eagle ===
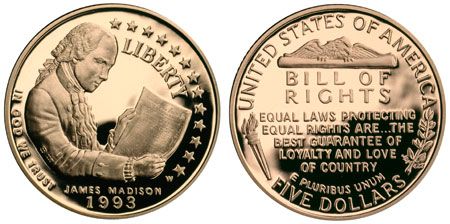
Bill of Rights gold half eagle obverse (left) and reverse (right)

The obverse of the Bill of Rights half eagle, designed by Scott R. Blazek, features Madison studying the Bill of Rights, with thirteen stars along the right edge. The reverse of the coin, designed by Joseph D. Pena, features a Madison quote accented by an eagle, the torch of freedom, and a laurel branch.

== Specifications ==
Half Dollar

- Display Box Color: Dark Blue
- Edge: Reeded
- Weight: 12.50 grams
- Diameter: 30.61 millimeters; 1.205 inches
- Composition: 90% silver; 10% copper

Dollar

- Display Box Color: Dark Blue
- Edge: Reeded
- Weight: 26.730 grams; 0.8594 troy ounce
- Diameter: 38.10 millimeters; 1.50 inches
- Composition: 90% Silver, 10% Copper

Half Eagle

- Display Box Color: Dark Blue
- Edge: Reeded
- Weight: 8.359 grams; 0.2687 troy ounce
- Diameter: 21.59 millimeters; 0.850 inch
- Composition: 90% Gold, 3.6% Silver, 6.4% Copper

== See also ==
- United States commemorative coins
- List of United States commemorative coins and medals (1990s)
- United States Constitution Bicentennial coins
