= 1984 Summer Olympics commemorative coins =

United States Mint commemorative coins

In 1983 and 1984, the United States Mint issued a series of commemorative coins to commemorate the 1984 Summer Olympic games held in Los Angeles. These coins were authorized by Public Law 97-220.

== Silver dollar ==
The first coin of the series was the 1983 silver dollar, which was the first commemorative dollar issued by the US Mint since the Grant Memorial gold dollar of 1922. Public Law 97-220 authorized 50,000,000 Los Angeles XXIII Olympiad dollars to be minted in 1983 and 1984. The obverse of the 1983 dollar features a discus thrower, while the reverse features an eagle. A total of 642,571 uncirculated 1983 dollars were minted at the Philadelphia, Denver, and San Francisco Mints, plus 1,577,025 proof dollars minted at San Francisco.

The silver dollar was redesigned in 1984, featuring the gateway to the Los Angeles Memorial Coliseum. The designer of this coin was Robert Graham, who had also designed the gateway that appeared on the coin. A total of 451,304 uncirculated 1984 dollars were minted at the three mints, plus 1,801,210 proof dollars minted at San Francisco.

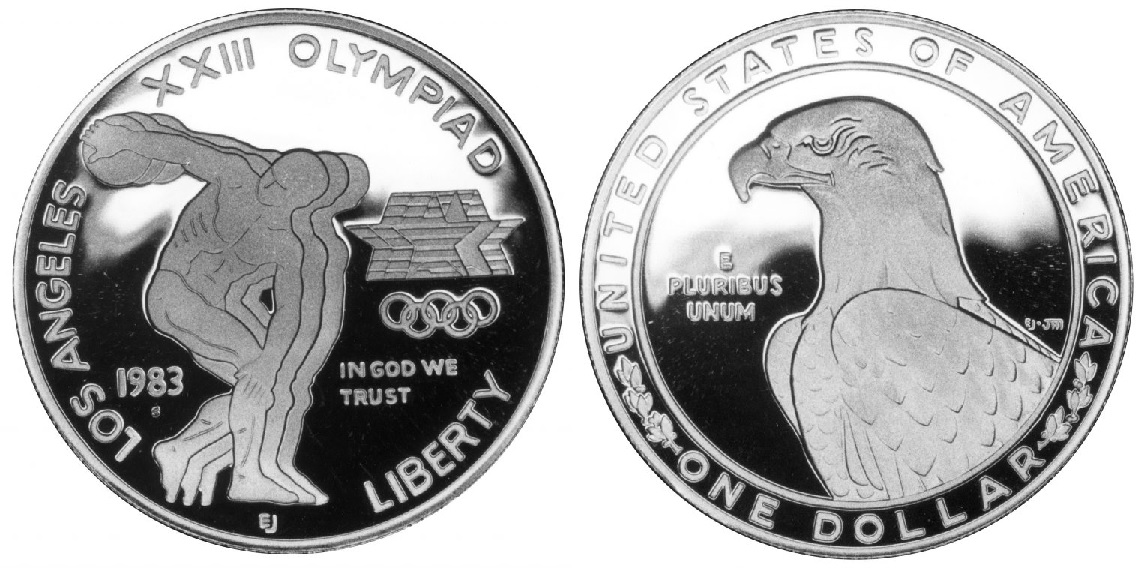
1983 silver dollar

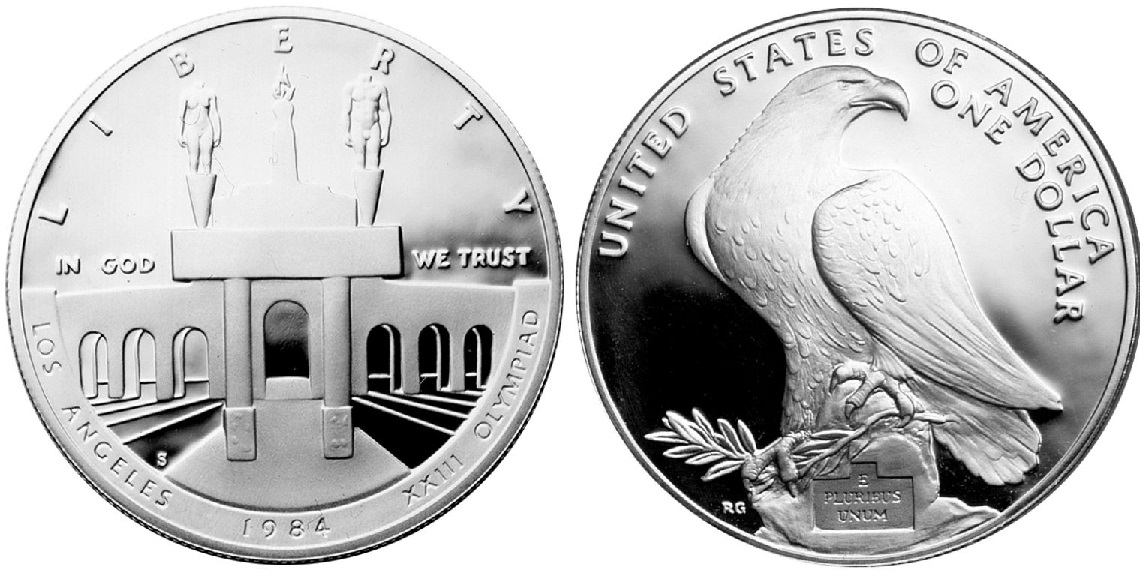
1984 silver dollar

== Gold eagle ==
A ten-dollar gold coin (a.k.a. Eagle) was released in 1984. This coin features male and female Olympic torch runners. Of the 2,000,000 coins authorized by Public Law 97-220, a total of 497,478 proof coins were minted at the four mints (a majority at the West Point Mint), and a further 75,886 uncirculated coins were minted at West Point.

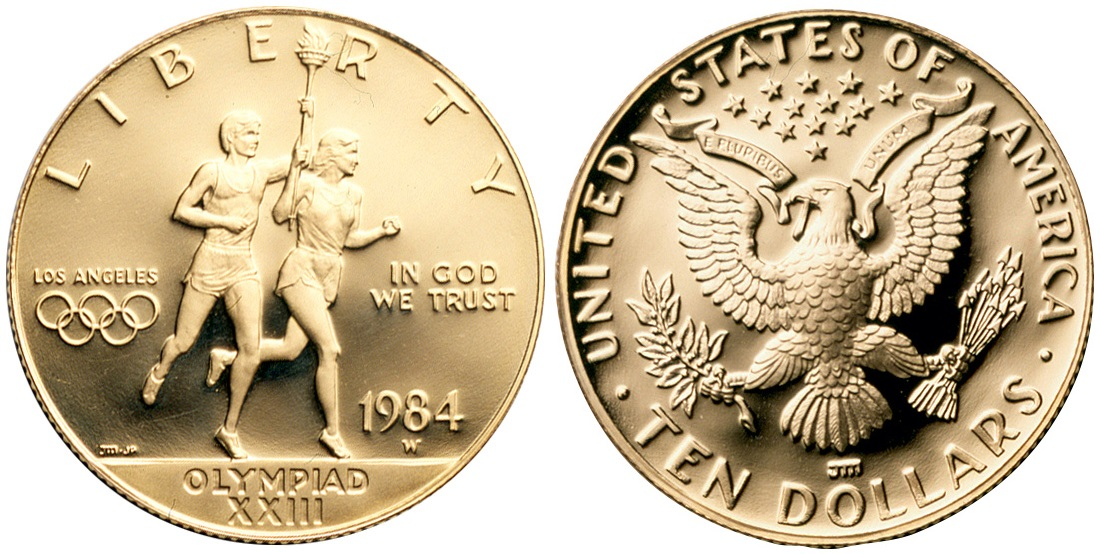
1984 Olympic eagle

== See also ==
- United States commemorative coins
- List of United States commemorative coins and medals (1980s)
