= Marcel Jovine =

American sculptor

- Born: January , 1921; Castellammare di Stabia
- Died: January 20, 2003 (aged 81–82); Greenwich, Connecticut: United States of America
- Education: drawing courses
- Known for: Visible Man/Woman
- Notable work: 1987 Constitution commemorative coin
- Spouse: Angela D'Oro
- Children: daughter

Marcel Jovine (1921 – January 20, 2003) was an Italian-born American sculptor who was best known as the creator of the toys "The Visible Man" and "The Visible Woman". He also created the municipal seal for the Borough of Closter, New Jersey, where he resided.

== Early life ==
Jovine was born in Castellammare di Stabia, Italy and grew up in Naples, Italy and took courses in drawing while attending the Italian military academy. He was captured in North Africa while serving with the Italian Army. As a prisoner of war in a camp in Pennsylvania, he used his drawing skills to create designs and sculptures. He met his future wife, Angela D'Oro, after having seen her perform on piano for POWs. He returned to the United States to marry D'Oro after he was released following the conclusion of World War II. He and his wife bought a large Victorian-style home in Closter using the royalties he earned from a doll called "Blessed Event" that was acquired from him by the Ideal Toy Company.

== Sculpting career ==
At a workshop in his Closter home, he developed toys that included pirate ships and military vehicles. His anatomically accurate models, "The Visible Man" and "The Visible Woman", created in the early 1960s, were his best-known creations.

Switching over to designing coins and medals in the 1970s, Jovine designed pieces for the 1980 Winter Olympics, for a $5 gold coin issued in 1987 to commemorate the 200th anniversary of the United States Constitution, and for the reverse of the 1990 Eisenhower Centennial silver dollar. He also created bronze sculptures of notable horses that were distinguished by their lifelike appearance.

Jovine died in Greenwich, Connecticut at the age of 81 on January 20, 2003, while visiting his daughter.
