= Monticello =

Primary residence of U.S. Founding Father Thomas Jefferson

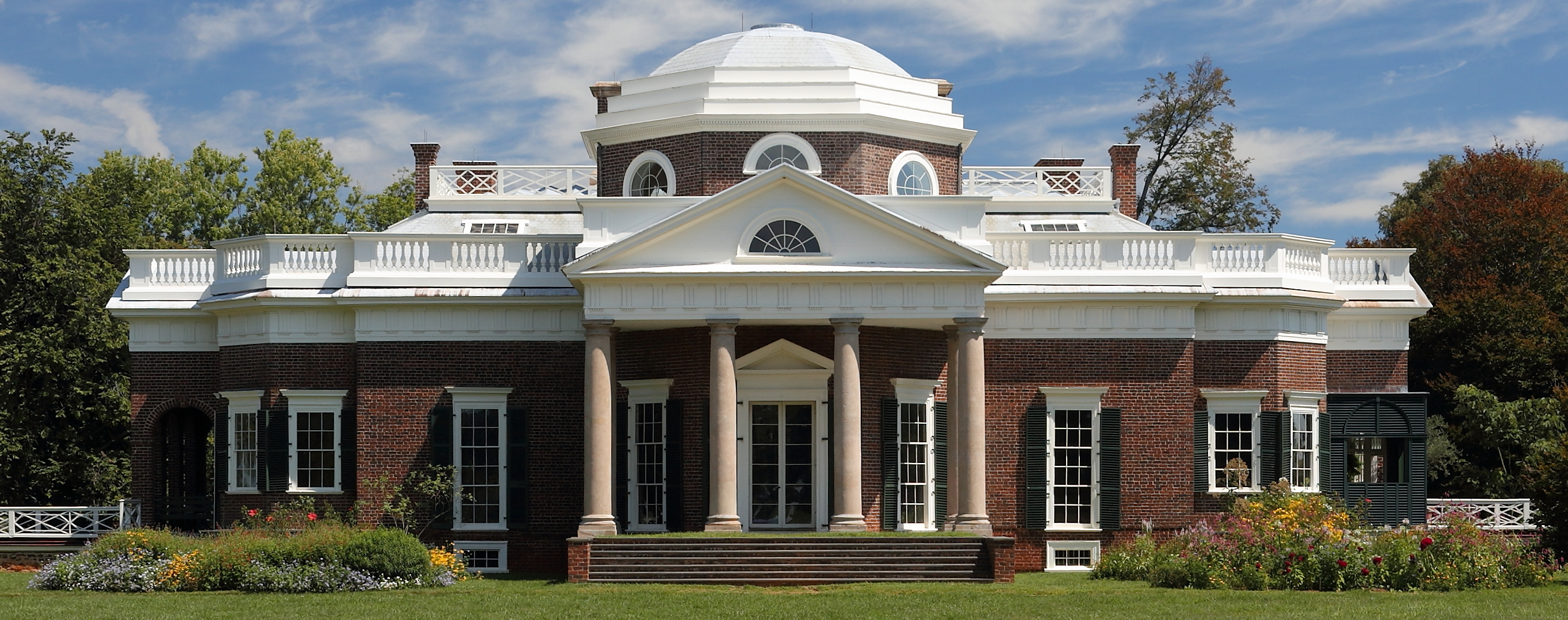
- Monticello in 2013
- Interactive map showing Monticello's location

General information
- Architectural style: Neoclassical, Palladian
- Location: Albemarle County, Virginia, near Charlottesville, Virginia, U.S.
- Coordinates: 38°00′37.1″N 78°27′08.4″W
- Year built: 1772
- Owner: The Thomas Jefferson Foundation (TJF)

Design and construction
- Architect: Thomas Jefferson

Website
- monticello.org

UNESCO World Heritage Site
- Type: Cultural
- Criteria: i, iv, vi
- Designated: 1987 (11th session)
- Part of: Monticello and the University of Virginia in Charlottesville
- Reference no.: 442
- Region: Europe and North America

U.S. National Register of Historic Places
- Designated: October 15, 1966"National Register Information System". National Register of Historic Places. National Park Service. March 15, 2006.
- Reference no.: 66000826

U.S. National Historic Landmark
- Designated: December 19, 1960"Monticello (Thomas Jefferson House)". National Historic Landmark summary listing. National Park Service. Archived from the original on October 6, 2012.

Virginia Landmarks Register
- Designated: September 9, 1969"Virginia Landmarks Register". Virginia Department of Historic Resources. Archived from the original on September 21, 2013.
- Reference no.: 002-0050

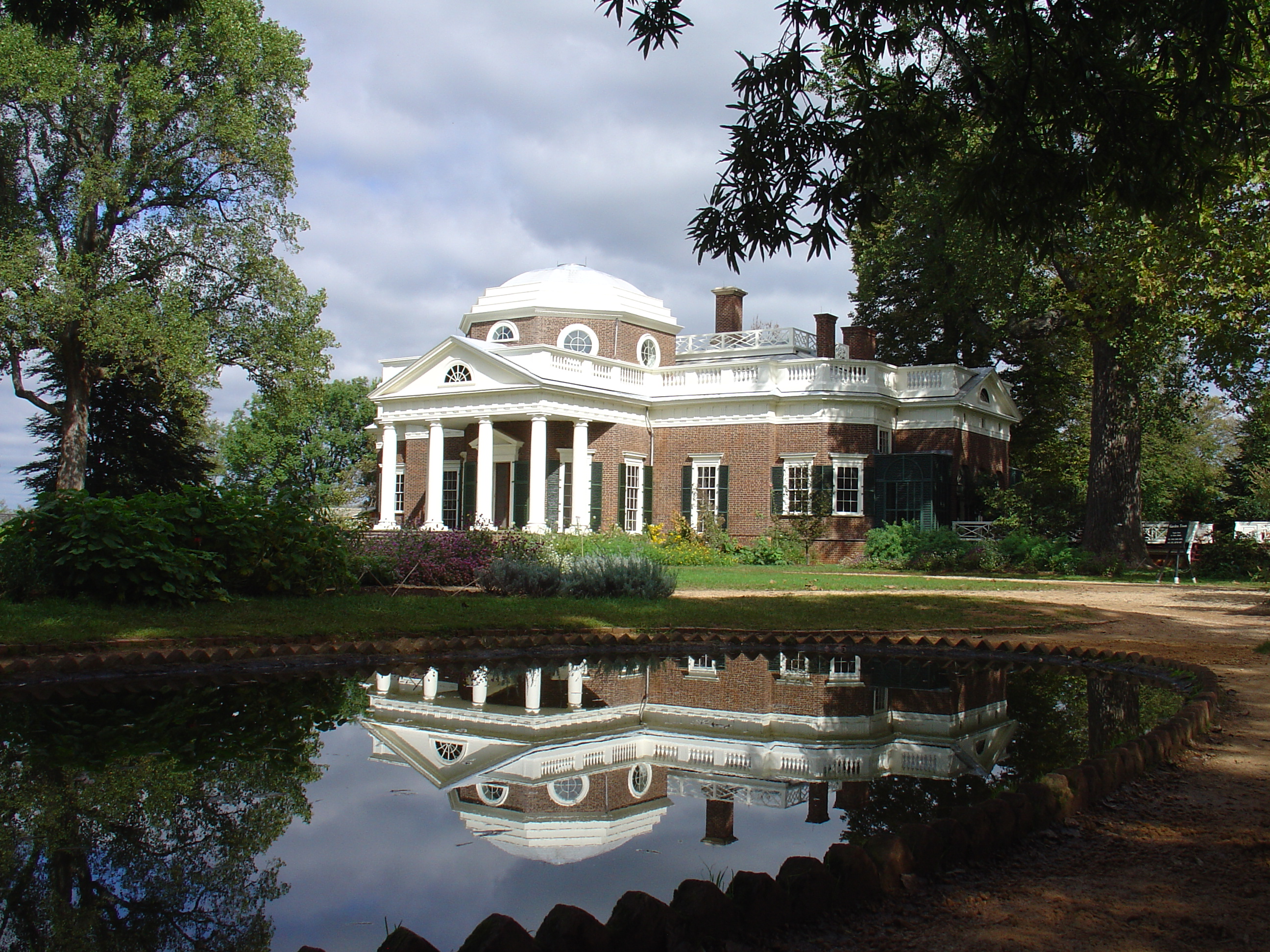
Monticello and its reflection

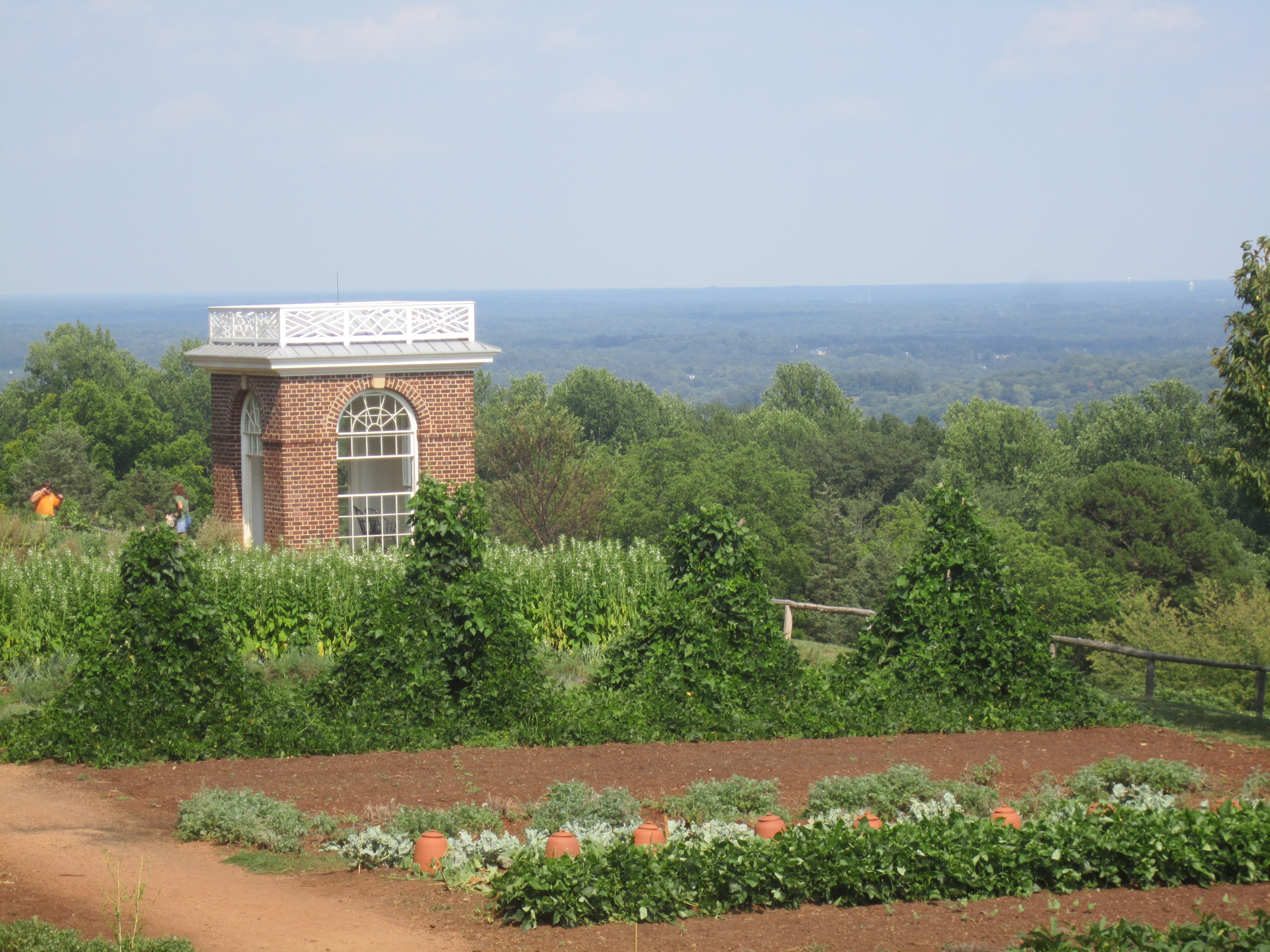
Some of the gardens on the property

Monticello (/ˌmɒntɪˈtʃɛloʊ/ MON-tih-CHEL-oh) was the primary residence and plantation of Thomas Jefferson, a Founding Father, author of the Declaration of Independence, and the third president of the United States. Jefferson began designing Monticello after inheriting land from his father at the age of 14. Located just outside Charlottesville, Virginia, in the Piedmont region, the plantation was originally 5,000 acres (20 km^{2}), with Jefferson using the forced labor of enslaved black people for extensive cultivation of tobacco and mixed crops, later shifting from tobacco cultivation to wheat in response to changing markets. Due to its architectural and historic significance, the property has been designated a National Historic Landmark. In 1987, Monticello and the nearby University of Virginia, also designed by Jefferson, were together designated a UNESCO World Heritage Site. The United States nickel has featured a depiction of Monticello on its reverse every year since 1938 with the exception of 2004–05.

Jefferson designed the main house using neoclassical design principles pioneered by Italian Renaissance architect Andrea Palladio and reworking the design through much of his presidency to include design elements popular in late 18th-century Europe and integrating numerous ideas of his own. Situated on the summit of an 850 ft-high (260 m) peak in the Southwest Mountains south of the Rivanna Gap, the name Monticello derives from Italian meaning "little mountain". Along a prominent lane adjacent to the house, Mulberry Row, the plantation came to include numerous outbuildings for specialized functions, e.g., a nailery; quarters for slaves who worked in the home; gardens for flowers, produce, and Jefferson's experiments in plant breeding—along with tobacco fields and mixed crops. Cabins for slaves who worked in the fields were farther from the mansion.

At Jefferson's direction, he was buried on the grounds, in an area now designated as the Monticello Cemetery. The cemetery is owned by the Monticello Association, a society of his descendants through Martha Wayles Skelton Jefferson. After Jefferson's death, his daughter Martha Jefferson Randolph, apart from the small family graveyard, sold Monticello for $7,500. In 1834, it was bought and saved from ruin by Uriah P. Levy, a commodore in the U.S. Navy, for $2,500, (~$85,987 in 2025) who admired Jefferson and spent significant funds to preserve the property. His nephew Jefferson Monroe Levy took over the property in 1879; he also invested considerable funds to restore and preserve it. In 1923, Monroe Levy sold it for $500,000 (~$7.35 million in 2025) to the Thomas Jefferson Foundation (TJF), which operates it as a house museum and educational institution.

== Design and building ==
Jefferson's home was built to serve as a plantation house, which ultimately took on the architectural form of a villa. Work began on what historians would subsequently refer to as "the first Monticello" in 1768, on a plantation of 5,000 acres (2,000 ha). Jefferson moved into the South Pavilion (an outbuilding) in 1770, where his new wife Martha Wayles Skelton joined him in 1772. Jefferson continued work on his original design, but how much was completed is of some dispute. In constructing and later reconstructing his home, Jefferson used a combination of free workers, indentured servants, and enslaved people.

After his wife's death in 1782, Jefferson left Monticello in 1784 to serve as Minister of the United States to France. During his several years in Europe, he had an opportunity to see some of the classical buildings with which he had become acquainted from his reading, as well as to discover the "modern" trends in French architecture that were then fashionable in Paris. His decision to extensively remodel and rebuild his own home may date from this period. In 1794, following his tenure as the first U.S. Secretary of State (1790–1793), Jefferson began rebuilding his house based on the ideas he had acquired in Europe. The remodeling continued throughout most of his presidency (1801–1809). Although generally completed by 1809, Jefferson continued work on Monticello until his death in 1826.

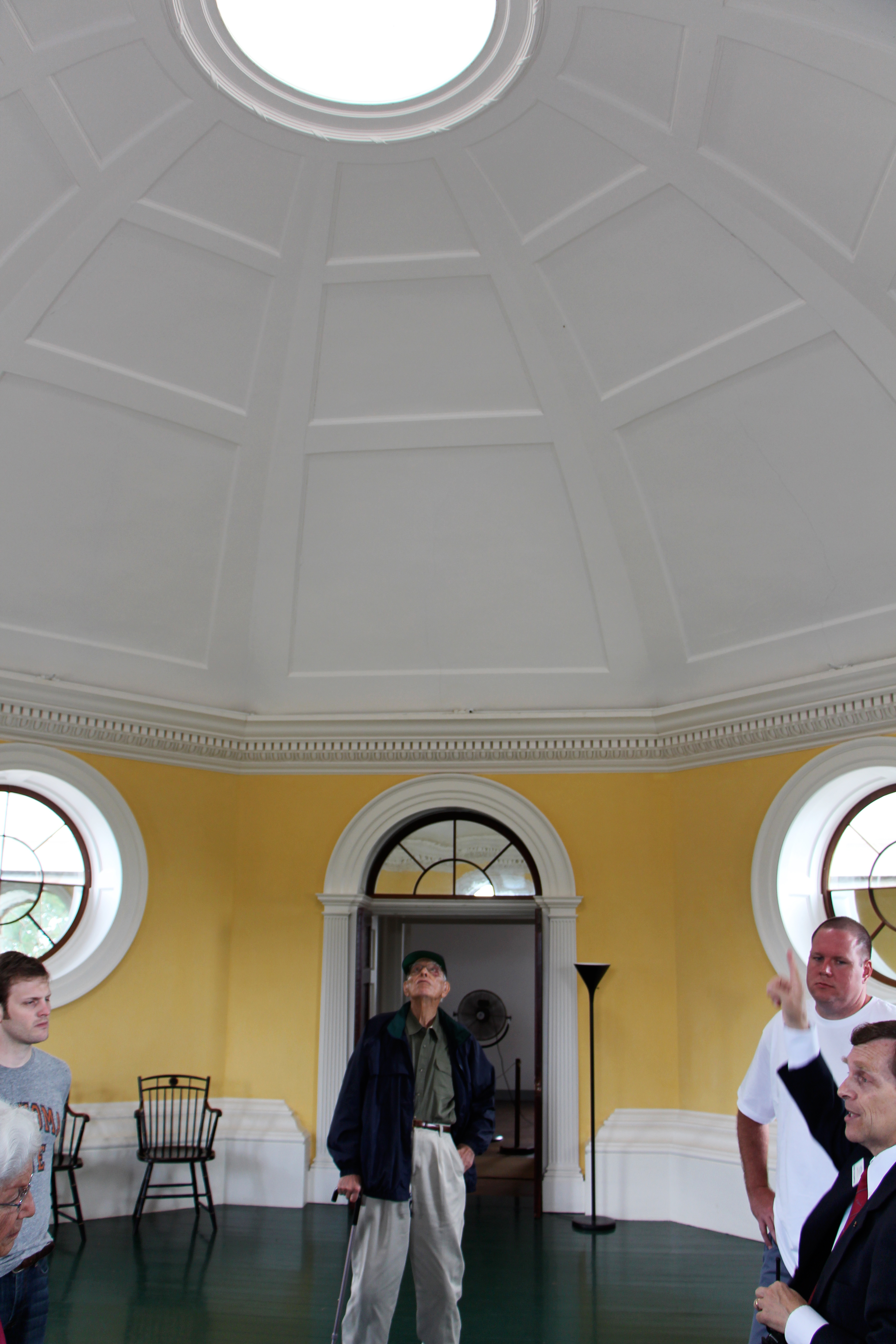
Under the dome

Jefferson added a center hallway and a parallel set of rooms to the structure, more than doubling its area. He removed the second full-height story from the original house and replaced it with a mezzanine bedroom floor. The interior is centered on two large rooms, which served as an entrance-hall-museum, where Jefferson displayed his scientific interests, and a music-sitting room. The most dramatic element of the new design was an octagonal dome, which he placed above the west front of the building in place of a second-story portico. The room inside the dome was described by a visitor as "a noble and beautiful apartment," but it was rarely used—perhaps because it was hot in summer and cold in winter, or because it could be reached only by climbing a steep and very narrow flight of stairs. The dome room has now been restored to its appearance during Jefferson's lifetime, with "Mars yellow" walls and a painted green and black checkered floor.

Summertime temperatures are high in the region, with indoor temperatures of around 100 °F (38 °C). Jefferson himself is known to have been interested in Roman and Renaissance texts about ancient temperature-control techniques such as ground-cooled air and heated floors. Monticello's large central hall and aligned windows were designed to allow a cooling air-current to pass through the house, and the octagonal cupola draws hot air up and out. In the late twentieth century, moderate air conditioning, designed to avoid the harm to the house and its contents that would be caused by major modifications and large temperature differentials, was installed in the house, a tourist attraction.

Before Jefferson's death, Monticello had begun to show signs of disrepair. The attention Jefferson's university project in Charlottesville demanded, and family problems, diverted his focus. The most important reason for the mansion's deterioration was his accumulating debts. In the last few years of Jefferson's life, much went without repair in Monticello. A witness, Samuel Whitcomb Jr., who visited Jefferson in 1824, thought it run down. He said, "His house is rather old and going to decay; appearances about his yard and hill are rather slovenly. It commands an extensive prospect but it being a misty cloudy day, I could see but little of the surrounding scenery."

== Preservation ==
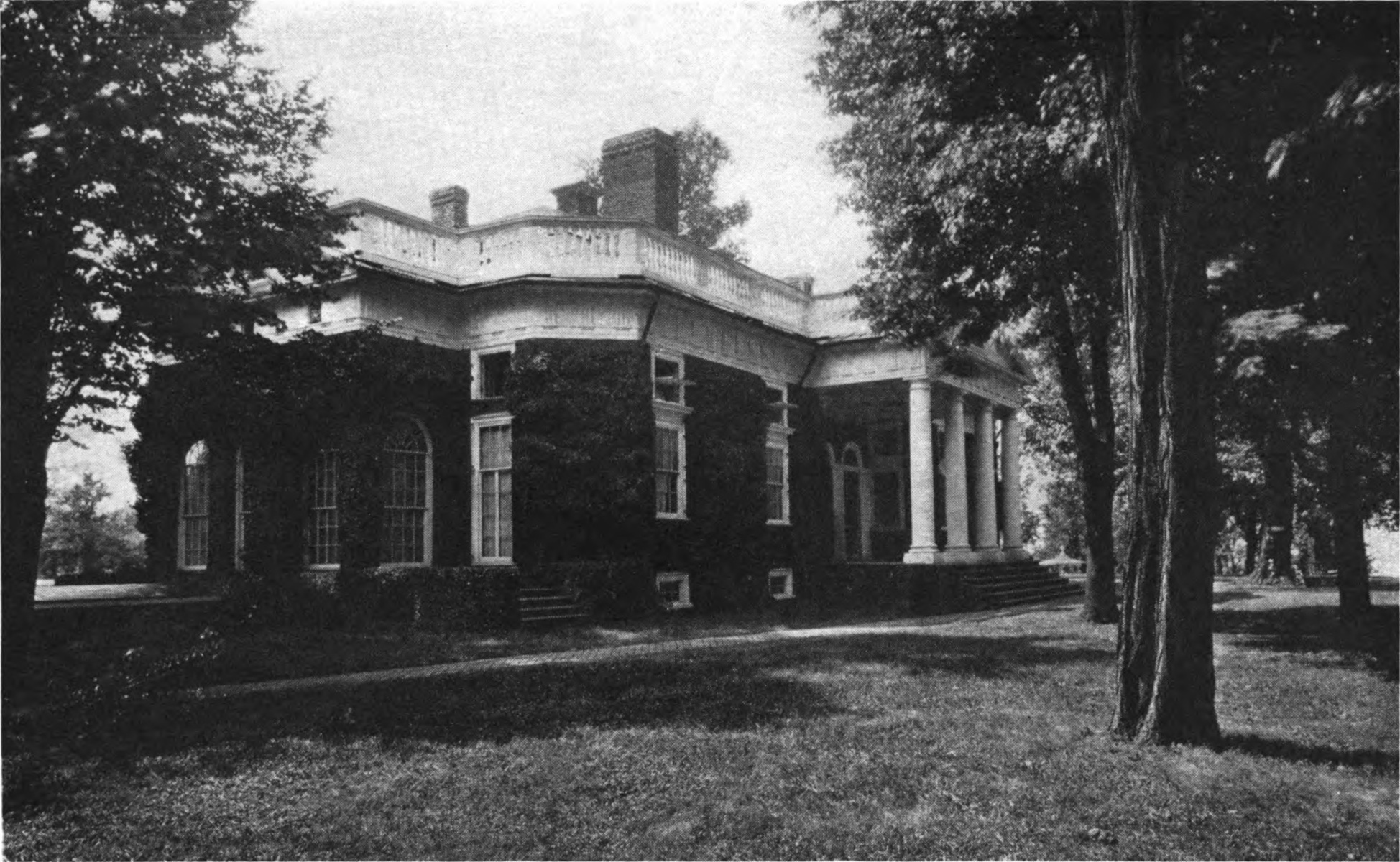
Monticello in 1926

After Jefferson died on July 4, 1826, his only official surviving non-enslaved daughter, Martha Jefferson Randolph, inherited Monticello. The estate was encumbered with debt and Martha Randolph had financial problems in her own family because of her husband's mental illness. In 1831, she sold Monticello to James Turner Barclay, a local apothecary, for $7,500 (~$266,488 in 2025). Barclay sold it in 1834 to Uriah P. Levy for $2,500, (~$80,625 in 2025) the first Jewish commodore (equivalent to today's rear admiral) in the United States Navy. A fifth-generation American whose family first settled in Savannah, Georgia, Levy greatly admired Jefferson and used private funds to repair, restore and preserve the house. The Confederate government seized the house as enemy property at the outset of the American Civil War and sold it to Confederate officer Benjamin Franklin Ficklin. Levy's estate recovered the property after the war.

Levy's heirs argued over his estate, but their lawsuits were settled in 1879, when Uriah Levy's nephew, Jefferson Monroe Levy, a prominent New York lawyer, real estate speculator, and stock speculator (and later member of Congress), bought out the other heirs for $10,050, (~$293,934 in 2025) and took control of Monticello. Like his uncle, Jefferson Levy commissioned repairs, restoration and preservation of the grounds and house, which had been deteriorating seriously while the lawsuits wound their way through the courts in New York and Virginia. Together, the Levys preserved Monticello for nearly 100 years.

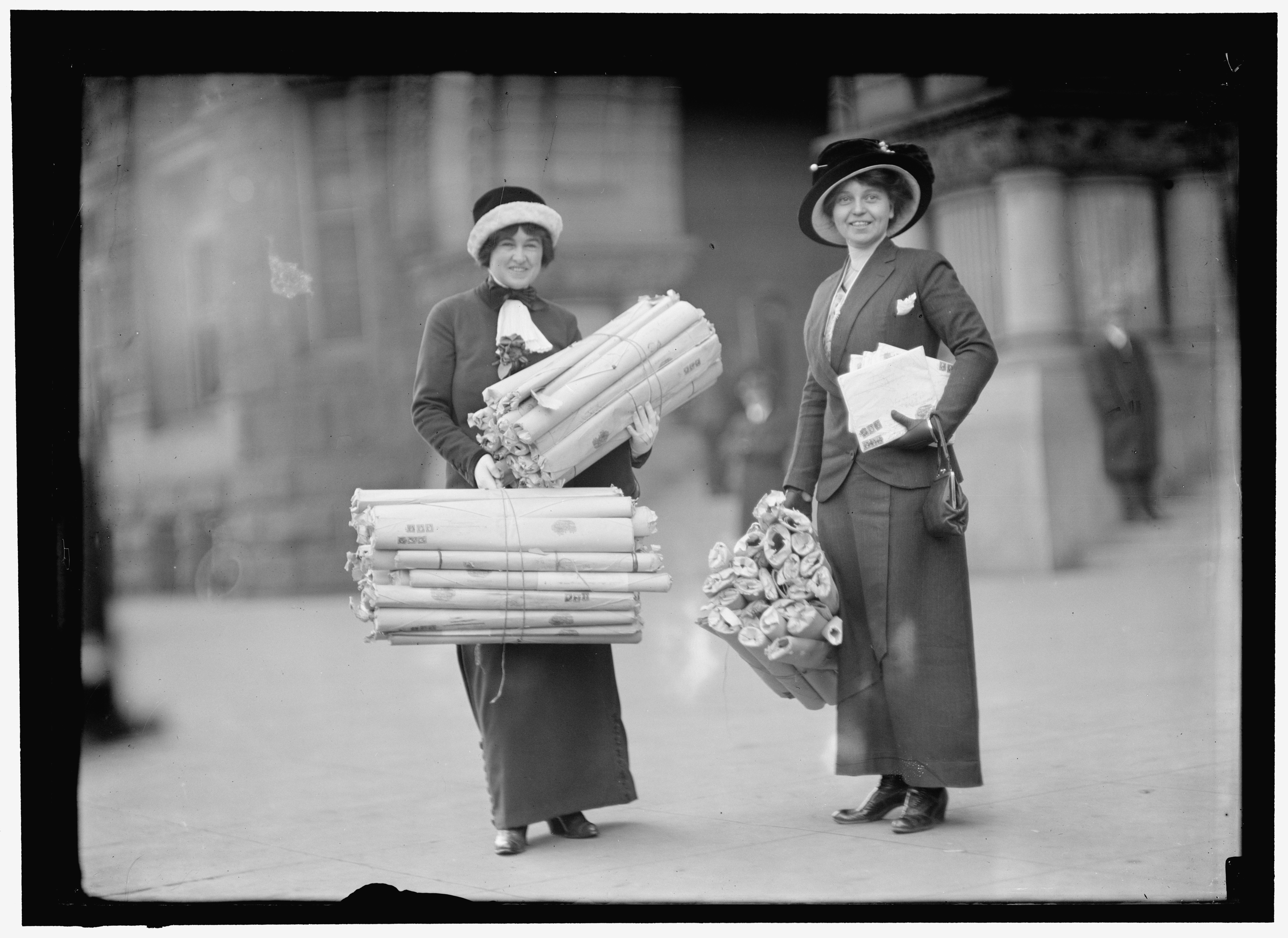
Maud Littleton gatherings petitions to have Monticello expropriated from Jefferson Monroe Levy, 1912.

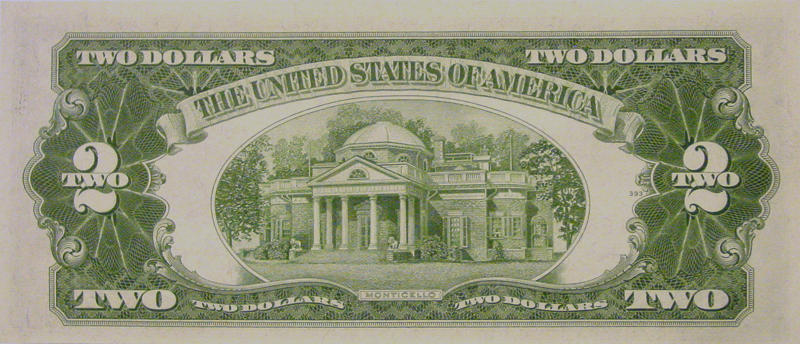
Monticello depicted on the reverse of the 1953 $2 bill. Note the two "Levy lions" on either side of the entrance. The lions, placed there by Jefferson Levy, were removed in 1923 when the Thomas Jefferson Foundation purchased the house.

In 1909, Maud Littleton, the wife of Martin W. Littleton, visited Monticello. Following her visit, Littleton launched a nationwide antisemitic campaign to have Monticello expropriated from Jefferson Levy. Littleton took her campaign to the press as well as to Congress, with two bills to expropriate Monticello from Levy failing to pass. Littleton used veiled antisemitic remarks to disparage Levy, such as calling him an "alien", "oriental", and a "rank outsider" who had allegedly altered the character of "the house that Jefferson built and made sacred." Littleton also made attempts to purchase Monticello. Angered by Littleton's antisemitism, Levy refused to sell his property. However, due to strained finances, Levy reluctantly sold Monticello to a foundation. Maud Littleton became the organization's first executive director. For the next 60 years, mention of the Levy family was erased by the foundation, despite the fact that Levy's mother Rachel is buried at Monticello. Neglected for decades, Rachel's grave was refurbished in 1985, under the foundation's new executive director Daniel Jordan.

In 1923, a private non-profit organization, the Thomas Jefferson Foundation, purchased the house from Jefferson Levy for $500,000 (~$7.35 million in 2025) with funds raised by Theodore Fred Kuper and others. They managed additional restoration under architects including Fiske Kimball and Milton L. Grigg. Since that time, other restoration has been performed at Monticello.

The Jefferson Foundation operates Monticello and its grounds as a house museum and educational institution. Visitors can wander the grounds, as well as tour rooms in the cellar and ground floor. More expensive tour pass options include sunset hours, as well as tours of the second floor and the third floor, including the iconic dome.

Monticello is a National Historic Landmark. It is the only private home in the United States to be designated a UNESCO World Heritage Site. Included in that designation are the original grounds and buildings of Jefferson's University of Virginia. From 1989 to 1992, a team of architects from the Historic American Buildings Survey (HABS) created a collection of measured drawings of Monticello. These drawings are held by the Library of Congress.

Among Jefferson's other designs are Poplar Forest, his private retreat near Lynchburg (which he intended for his daughter Maria, who died at age 25), the "academic village" of the University of Virginia, and the Virginia State Capitol in Richmond.

== Decoration and furnishings ==
Much of Monticello's interior decoration reflects the personal ideas and ideals of Jefferson.

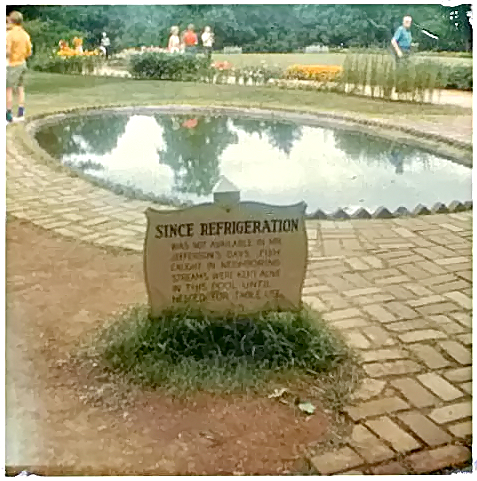
In a time before refrigeration, Jefferson had the pond stocked with fish, to be available on demand.

The original main entrance is through the portico on the east front. The ceiling of this portico incorporates a wind plate connected to a weather vane, showing the direction of the wind. A large clock face on the external east-facing wall has only an hour hand since Jefferson thought this was accurate enough for those he enslaved. The clock reflects the time shown on the "Great Clock", designed by Jefferson, in the entrance hall. The entrance hall contains recreations of items collected by Lewis and Clark on the cross-country expedition commissioned by Jefferson to explore the Louisiana Purchase. Jefferson had the floorcloth painted a "true grass green" upon the recommendation of artist Gilbert Stuart, so that Jefferson's "essay in architecture" could invite the spirit of the outdoors into the house.

The south wing includes Jefferson's private suite of rooms. The library holds many books from his third library collection. His first library was burned in an accidental plantation fire, and he 'ceded' (or sold) his second library in 1815 to the United States Congress to replace the books lost in the 1814 burning of Washington during the War of 1812. This second library formed the nucleus of the Library of Congress.

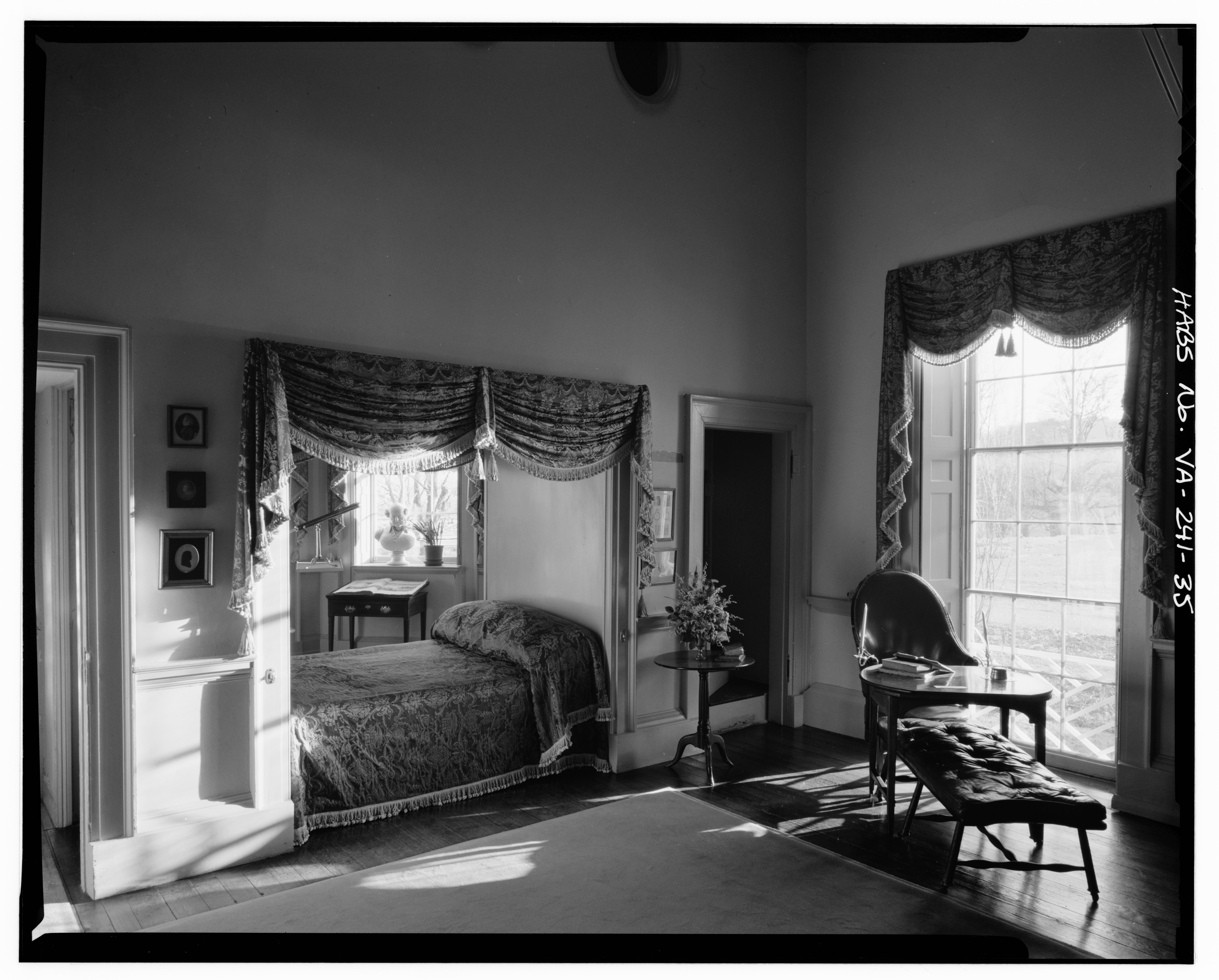
Master Bedroom, looking southwest (1978)

As "larger than life" as Monticello seems, the house has approximately 11,000 sq ft (1,000 m^{2}) of living space. Jefferson considered much furniture to be a waste of space, so the dining room table was erected only at mealtimes, and beds were built into alcoves cut into thick walls that contain storage space. Jefferson's bed opens to two sides: to his cabinet (study) and to his bedroom (dressing room).

In 2017, a room identified as Sally Hemings' quarters at Monticello, adjacent to Jefferson's bedroom, was discovered in an archaeological excavation. It will be restored and refurbished. This is part of the Mountaintop Project, which includes restorations in order to give a fuller account of the lives of both enslaved and free families at Monticello.

The west front gives the impression of a villa of modest proportions, with a lower floor disguised in the hillside.

The north wing includes two guest bedrooms and the dining room. It has a dumbwaiter incorporated into the fireplace, as well as dumbwaiters (shelved tables on casters) and a pivoting serving door with shelves.

== Food and cuisine ==
Monticello is known as the birthplace of macaroni and cheese in the United States. While it is a myth that Monticello is its American birthplace, it is true that it was made popular there. Jefferson's enslaved cook James Hemings, brother of Sally Hemings, Jefferson's enslaved mistress, perfected the dish and made it similar to the way it is prepared today.

== Quarters for slaves on Mulberry Row ==
Jefferson located one set of his quarters for enslaved people on Mulberry Row, a one-thousand ft (300 m) road of slave, service, and industrial structures. Mulberry Row was situated three hundred ft (100 m) south of Monticello, with the quarters facing the Jefferson mansion. These cabins were occupied by the black slaves who worked in the mansion or in Jefferson's manufacturing ventures, and not by those who labored in the fields. At one point, "Jefferson sketched out plans for a row of substantial, dignified neoclassical houses" for Mulberry Row, for enslaved blacks and white workers, "having in mind an integrated row of residences."

Archaeology of the site shows that the rooms of the cabins were much larger in the 1770s than in the 1790s. Researchers disagree as to whether this indicates that more enslaved people were crowded into smaller spaces, or that fewer people lived in the smaller spaces. Earlier quarters for enslaved people had a two-room plan, one family per room, with a single, shared doorway to the outside. But from the 1790s on, all rooms/families had independent doorways. Most of the cabins are free-standing, single-room structures.

By the time of Jefferson's death, some enslaved families had labored and lived for four generations at Monticello. Thomas Jefferson recorded his strategy for child labor in his Farm Book. Until the age of 10, children served as nurses. When the plantation grew tobacco, children were at a good height to remove and kill tobacco worms from the crops. Once he began growing wheat, fewer people were needed to maintain the crops, so Jefferson established manual trades. He stated that children "go into the ground or learn trades". When girls were 16, they began spinning and weaving textiles. Boys made nails from age 10 to 16. In 1794, Jefferson had a dozen boys working at the nailery. While working at the nailery, boys received more food (during this period, cornmeal and salted fish were common rations for the enslaved) and may have received new clothes if they did a good job. After the nailery, boys became blacksmiths, coopers, carpenters, or house servants.

Six families and their descendants were featured in the exhibit, Slavery at Jefferson's Monticello: Paradox of Liberty (January to October 2012) at the Smithsonian's National Museum of American History, which also examined Jefferson as an enslaver. Developed as a collaboration between the National Museum of African American History and Culture and Monticello, it is the first exhibit on the national mall to address such issues.

In February 2012, Monticello opened a new outdoor exhibit on its grounds: Landscape of Slavery: Mulberry Row at Monticello, to convey more about the lives of the hundreds of slaves who lived and worked at the plantation. Monticello's Burial Ground for Enslaved People, rediscovered in 2001, was subsequently rededicated as hallowed ground in 2022.

== Outbuildings and plantation ==
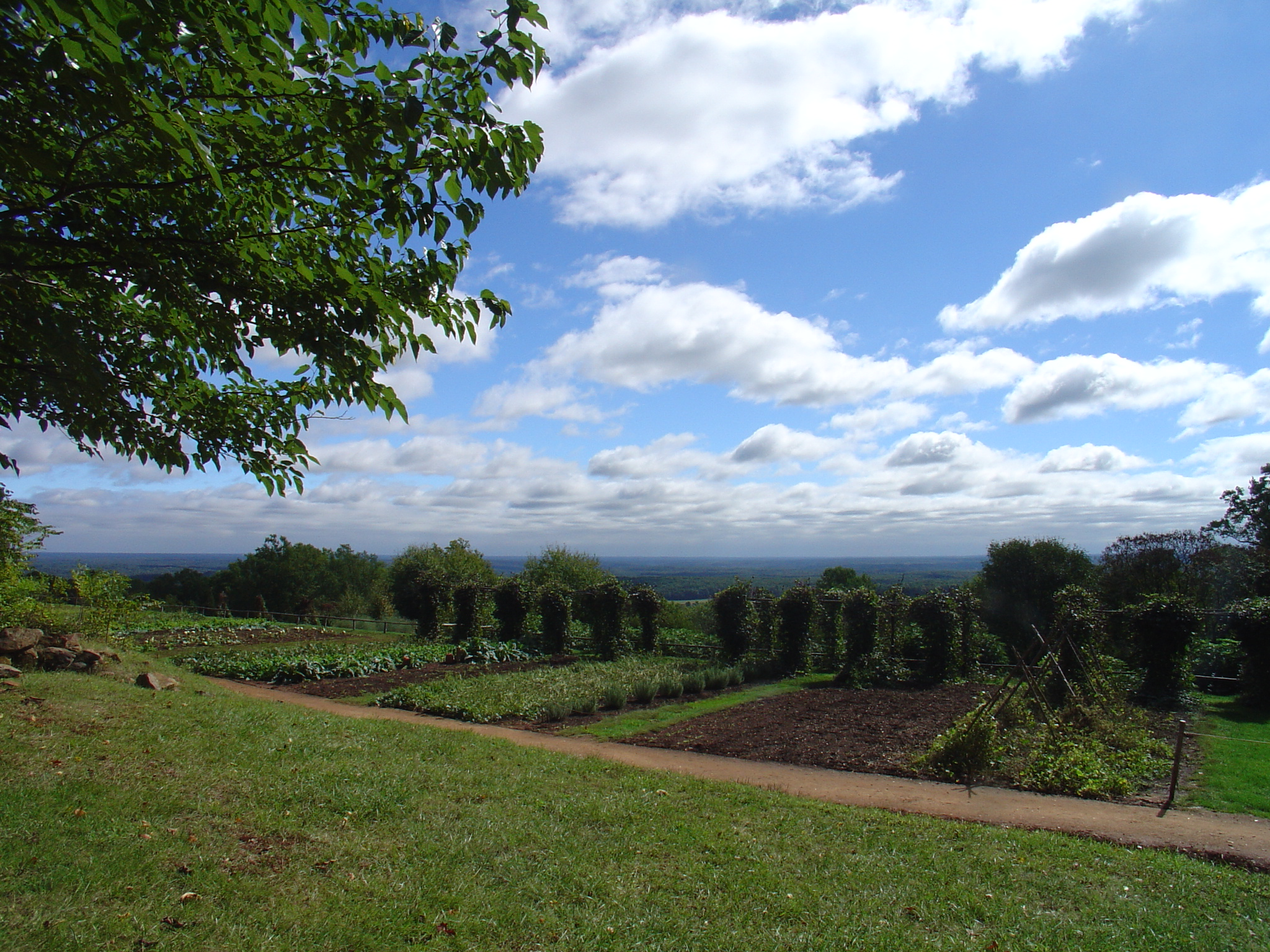
Jefferson's vegetable garden

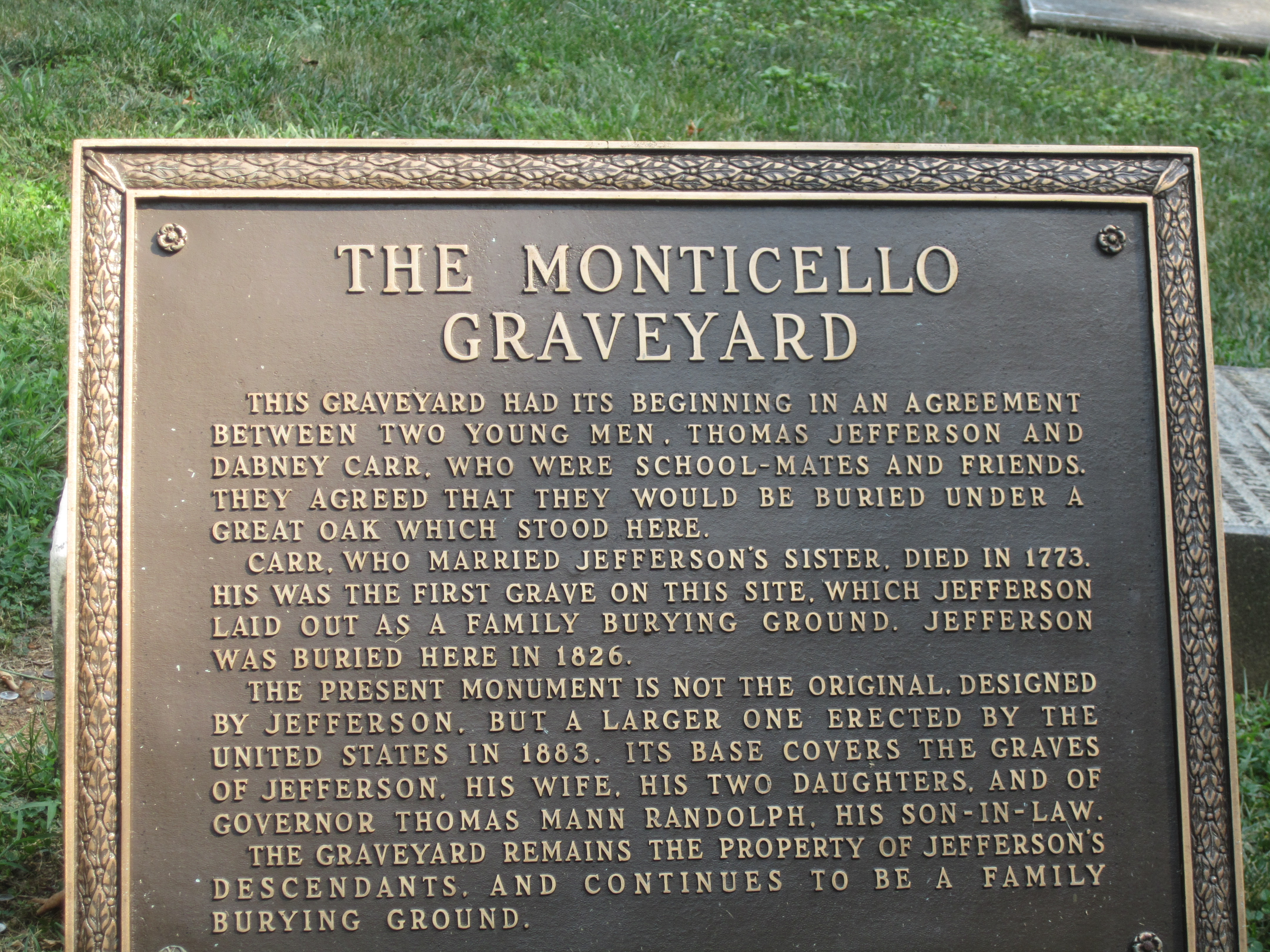
Plaque commemorating Monticello Graveyard, owned and operated separately by the Monticello Association

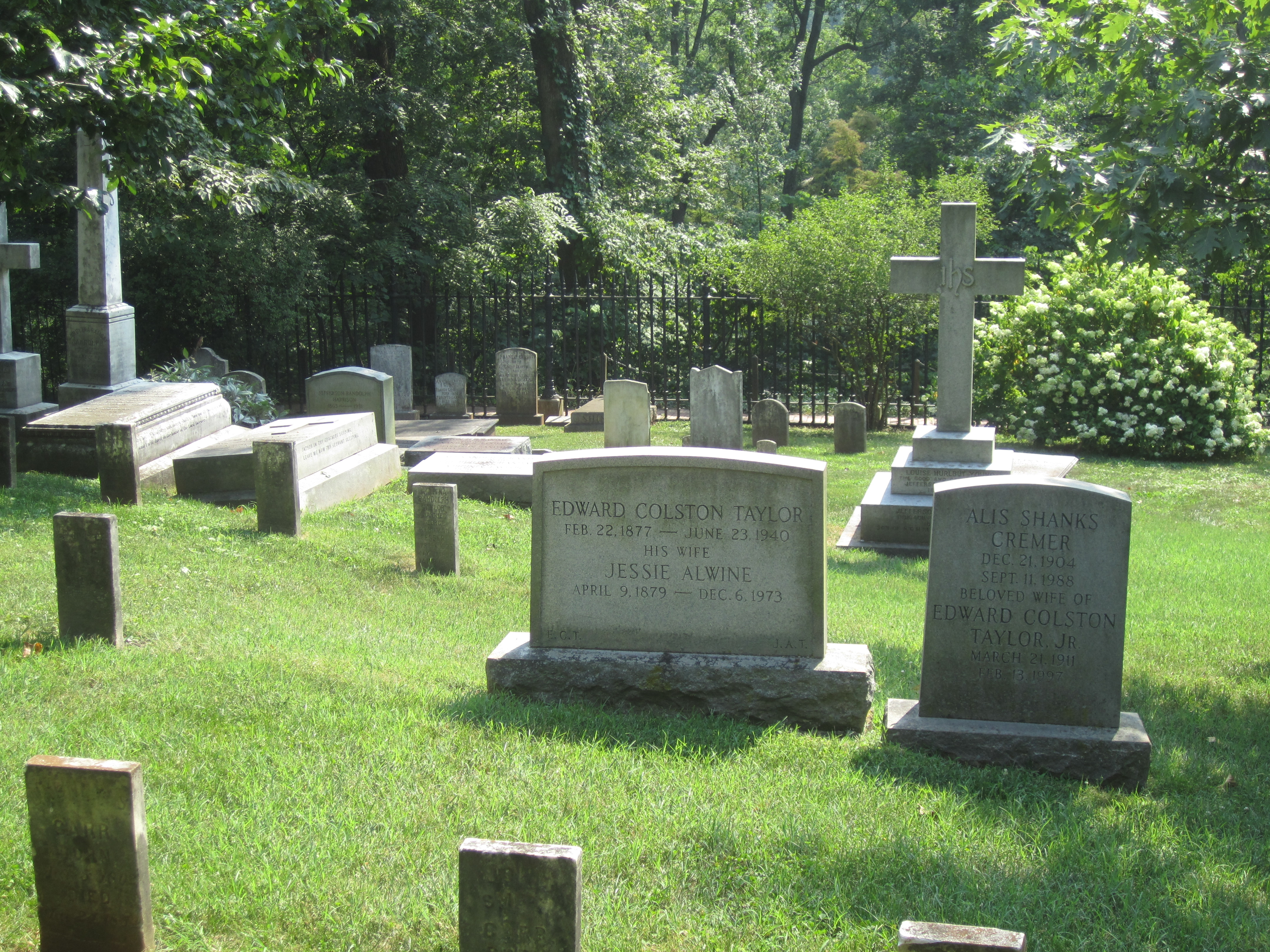
Monticello Graveyard

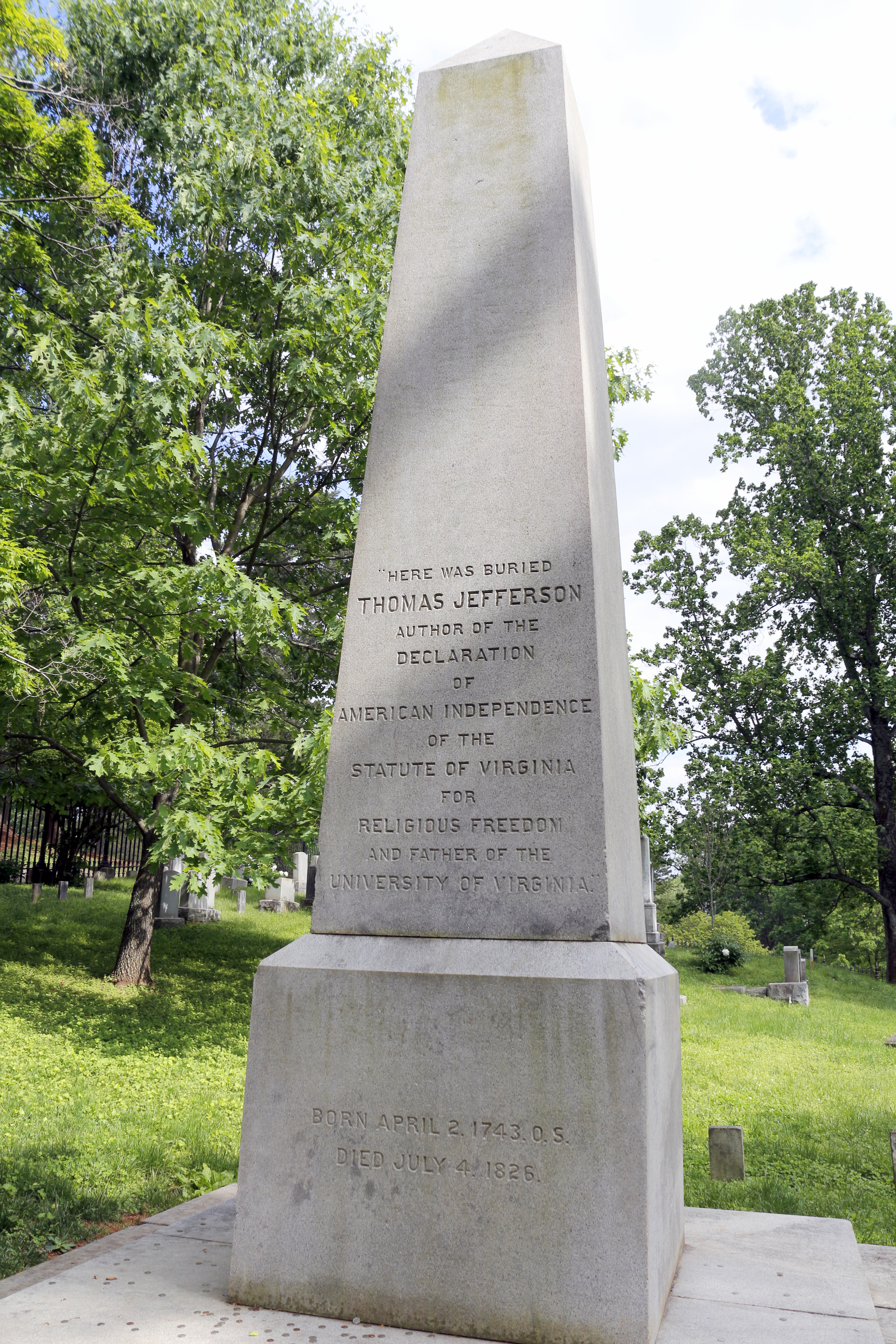
Jefferson's gravestone, with an epitaph written by him, does not mention that he was President of the United States.

The main house was augmented by small outlying pavilions to the north and south. A row of outbuildings (dairy, a washhouse, store houses, a small nail factory, a joinery, etc.) and quarters for slaves (log cabins), known as Mulberry Row, lay nearby to the south. A stone weaver's cottage survives, as does the tall chimney of the joinery, and the foundations of other buildings. A cabin on Mulberry Row was, for a time, the home of Sally Hemings, Jefferson's sister-in-law and a slave woman who worked in the household. Hemings is widely believed to have had a 38-year relationship with the widower Jefferson and to have borne six children by him, four of whom survived to adulthood. The genealogist Helen F.M. Leary concluded that "the chain of evidence securely fastens Sally Hemings's children to their father, Thomas Jefferson." Later Hemings lived in a room in the "south dependency" below the main house.

On the slope below Mulberry Row, African slaves maintained an extensive vegetable garden for the main house. In addition to growing flowers for display and producing crops for eating, Jefferson used the gardens of Monticello for experimenting with different species. The house was the center of a plantation of 5,000 acres (2,000 ha) tended by some 150 slaves. There are also two houses included in the whole.

=== Programming ===
In recent decades, the TJF has created programs to more fully interpret the lives of slaves at Monticello. Beginning in 1993, researchers interviewed descendants of Monticello slaves for the Getting Word Project, a collection of oral history that provided much new insight into the lives of slaves at Monticello and their descendants. (Among findings were that no slaves adopted Jefferson as a surname, but many had their own surnames as early as the 18th century.)

Some of Mulberry Row has been designated as archaeological sites, where excavations and analysis are revealing much about the life of slaves at the plantation. In the winter of 2000–2001, the African slave burial ground at Monticello was discovered. In the fall of 2001, the Thomas Jefferson Foundation held a commemoration of the burial ground, in which the names of known slaves of Monticello were read aloud. Additional archaeological work is providing information about African American burial practices.

In 2003, Monticello welcomed a reunion of descendants of Jefferson from both the Wayles's and Hemings's sides of the family. It was organized by the descendants, who have created a new group called the Monticello Community. Additional and larger reunions have since been held.

=== Land purchase ===
In 2004, the trustees of TJF acquired Mountaintop Farm (also known locally as Patterson's or Brown's Mountain), the only property that overlooks Monticello. Jefferson had called the taller mountain Montalto. To prevent development of new homes on the site, the trustees spent $15 million to purchase the property. Jefferson had owned it as part of his plantation, but it was sold off after his death. In the 20th century, its farmhouses were divided into apartments for many University of Virginia students. TJF officials had long considered the property an eyesore, and planned to acquire it when it became available.

== Architecture ==
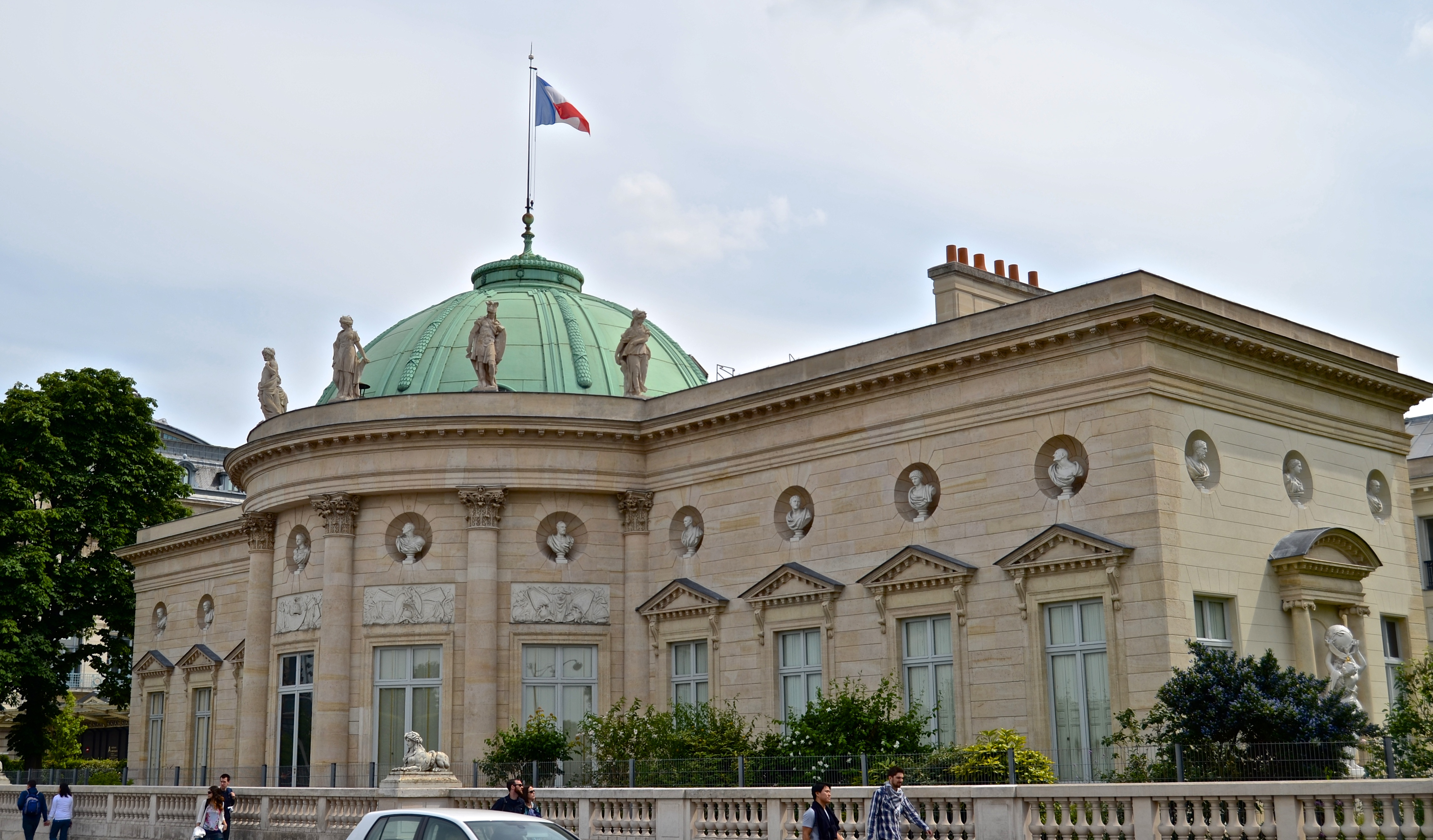
Hôtel de Salm, Paris

In 1784, Thomas Jefferson left America to travel and explore the streets of France, which influenced his taste in architecture. He was mainly influenced by the neoclassical style commonly seen in French architecture, which is the reason Monticello is designed in a classical revival style.

Jefferson had also been interested in the Pantheon, even though he was never able to make the trip to Rome to see it in person. Not only did the temple's facade influence Monticello, but also the Rotunda, which is a library found at the University of Virginia. Both buildings have a temple like front replicating the Pantheon facade with large structural columns. This building front is also similar to the Palladian. The back side of the buildings also pays tribute to the Roman temple. Jefferson did this by including a dome shape behind the temple front. After Jefferson resigned from Washington's cabinet, he chose to remodel portions of Monticello. This time he was greatly influenced by the Hôtel de Salm in Paris.

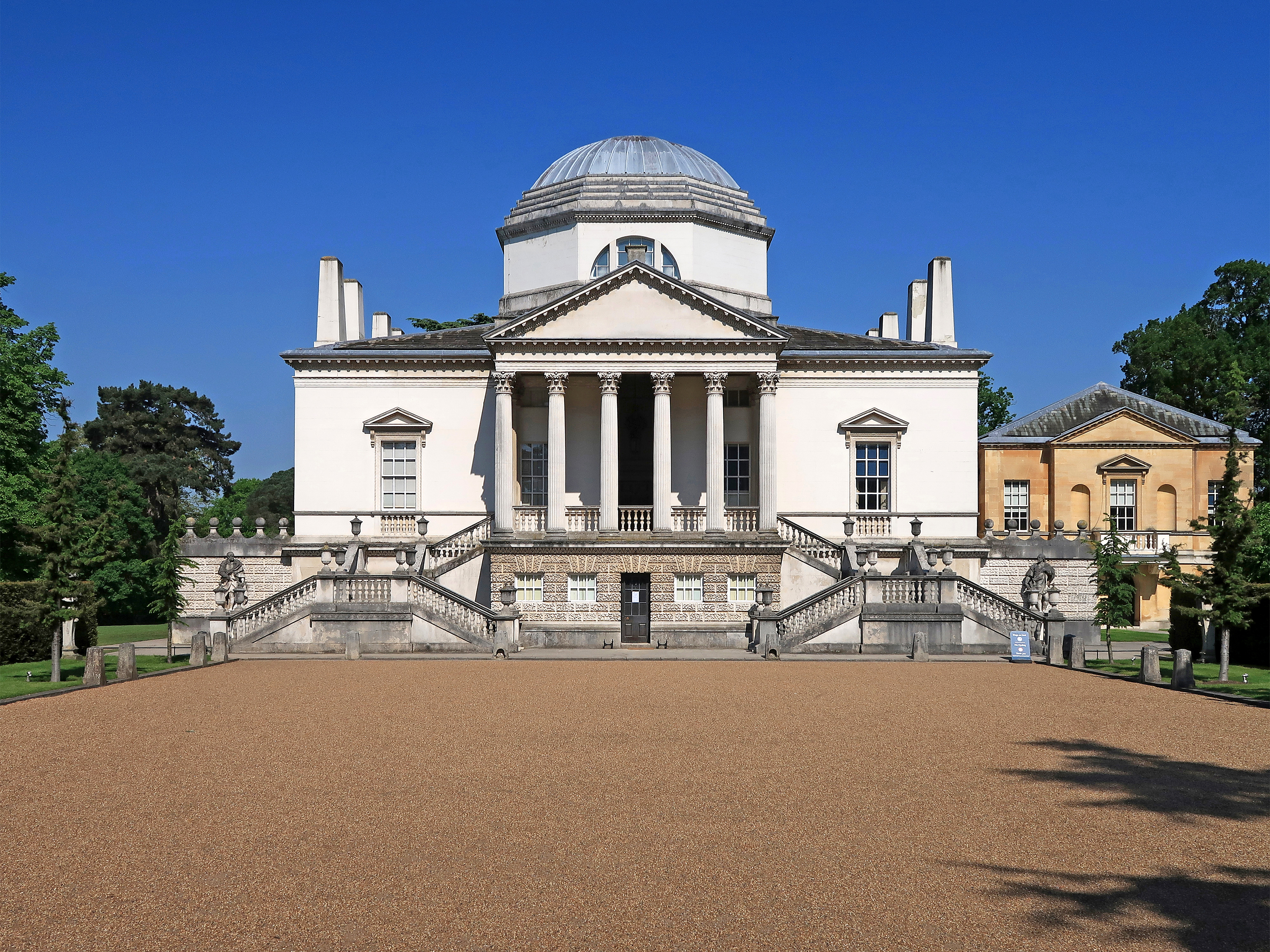
Chiswick House, London

The house is similar in appearance to Chiswick House, a Neoclassical house inspired by the architect Andrea Palladio built in 1726–1729 in London.

== Representation in other media ==
Monticello was featured in Bob Vila's A&E Network production, Guide to Historic Homes of America, in a tour which included Honeymoon Cottage and the Dome Room, which is open to the public during a limited number of tours each year.

== Replicas ==
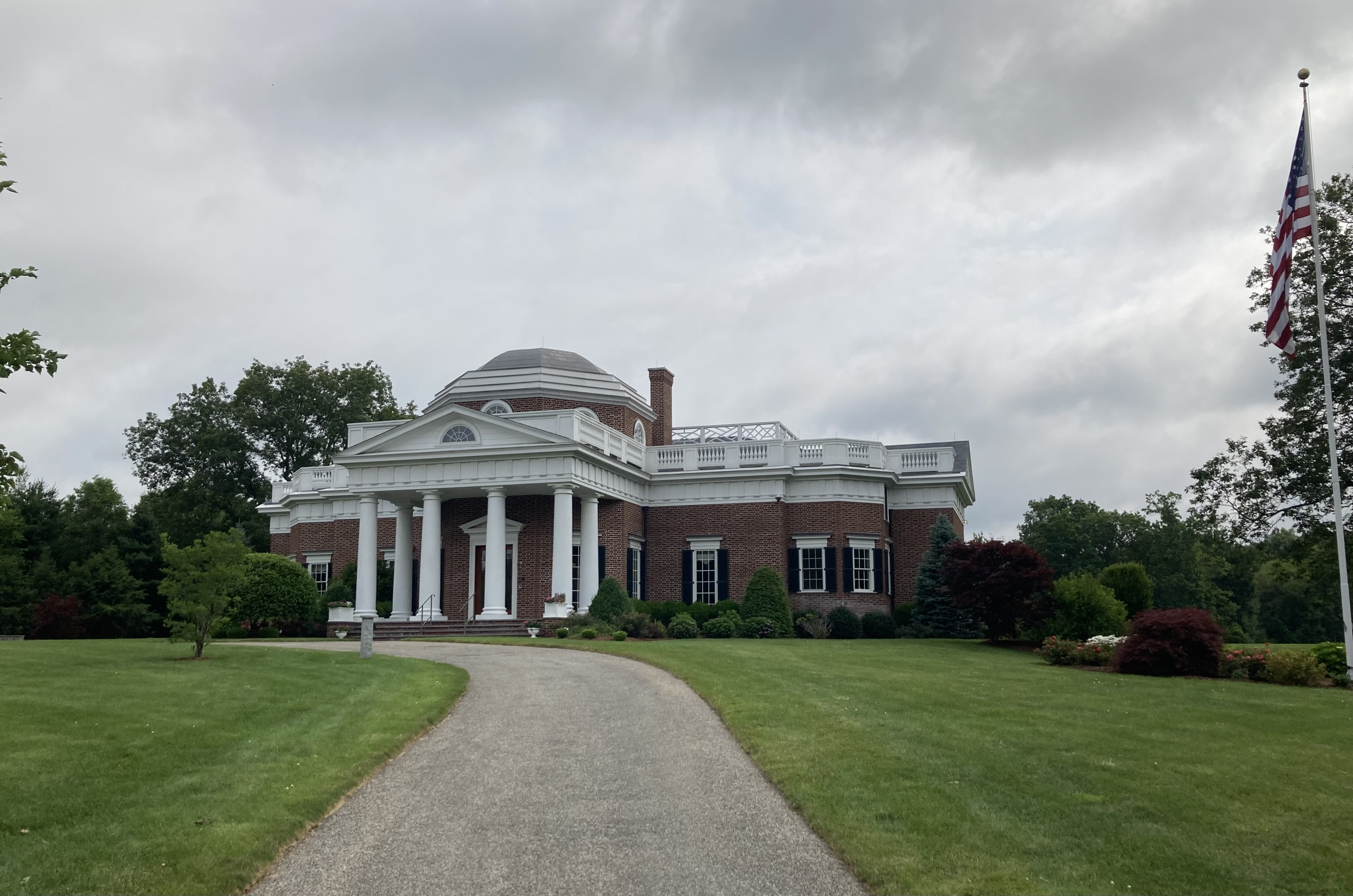
Hillsdale College's Blake Center for Faith and Freedom in Somers, Connecticut. Built in 2014 as a home by Friendly's founder S. Prestley Blake, the Monticello replica was donated to Hillsdale in 2019.

In 2014, S. Prestley Blake constructed a 10,000 sq ft (930 m^{2}) replica of Monticello in Somers, Connecticut. It can be seen on Route 186 also known as Hall Hill Road. In 2019, Blake donated the house to Hillsdale College to serve as a satellite campus for its Blake Center for Faith and Freedom.

The entrance pavilion of the Naval Academy Jewish Chapel at Annapolis is modeled on Monticello.

Chamberlin Hall at Wilbraham & Monson Academy in Wilbraham, Massachusetts, built in 1962 and modeled on Monticello, serves as the location of the academy's Middle School.

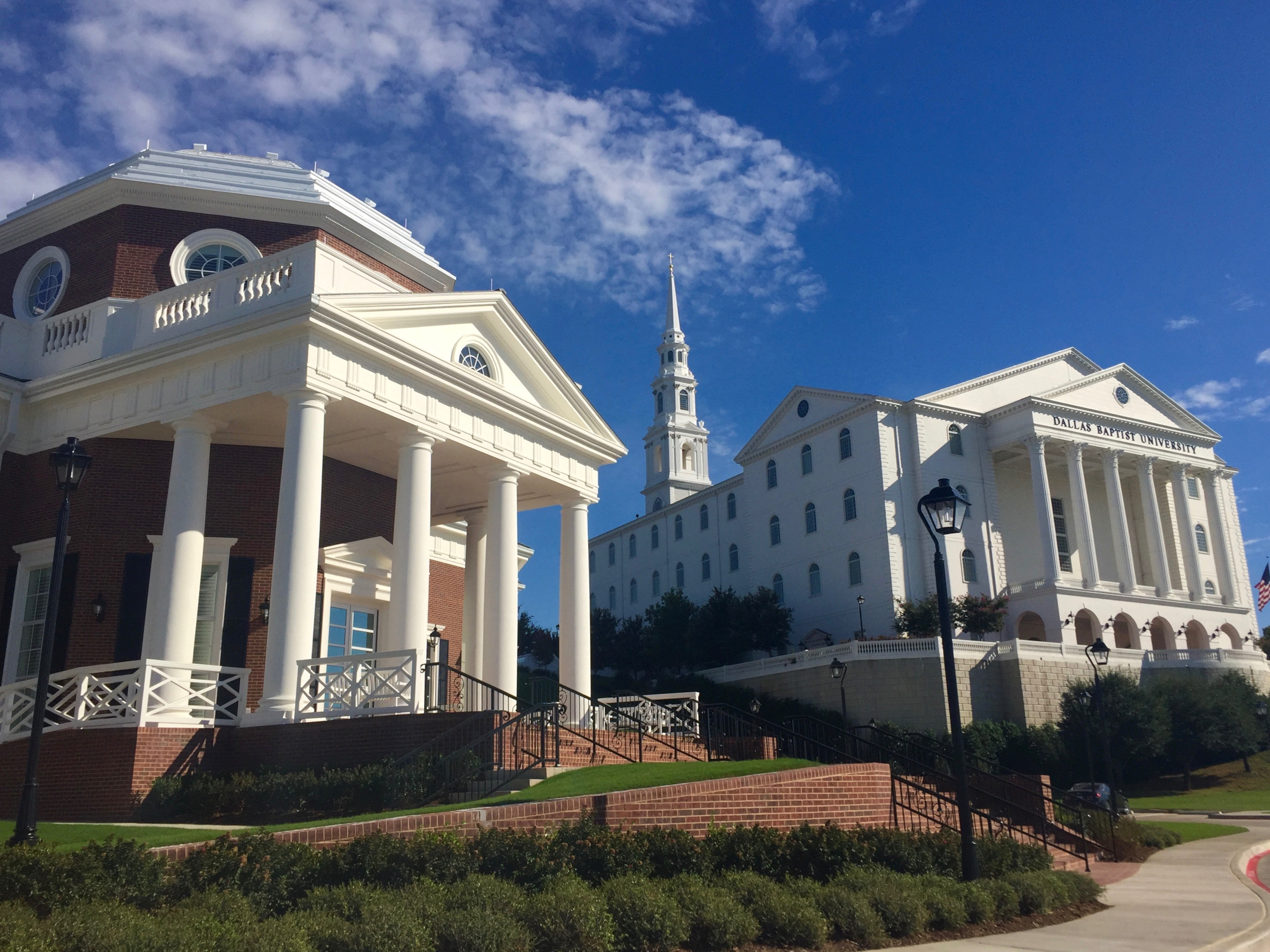
Jim and Sally Nation Hall (left), a Monticello replica at Dallas Baptist University.

Completed in August 2015, Dallas Baptist University built one of the largest replicas of Monticello, including its entry halls and a dome room. Approximately 23,000 sq ft (2,100 m^{2}), it is the home of the Gary Cook School of Leadership, as well as the University Chancellor's offices.

Saint Paul's Baptist Church located at the corner of East Belt Boulevard and Hull Street Road in Richmond is modeled after Monticello. Originally built by Weatherford Memorial Baptist Church, the building was donated to St Paul's when Weatherford Memorial disbanded in the early 2000s.

Pi Kappa Alpha's Memorial Headquarters, opened in 1988, is located in the TPC Southwind development in Memphis, Tennessee and was inspired by the architecture of Monticello.

Perrot Library (1931), Old Greenwich, Connecticut, was inspired by Jeffersonian architecture and Monticello.

The exterior of University of the Cumberlands' Ward and Regina Correll Science Complex is also a replica of Thomas Jefferson's Monticello mansion. The $1 million expansion of the Science Complex was started in May 2007 and classes began in January 2009.

== Legacy ==
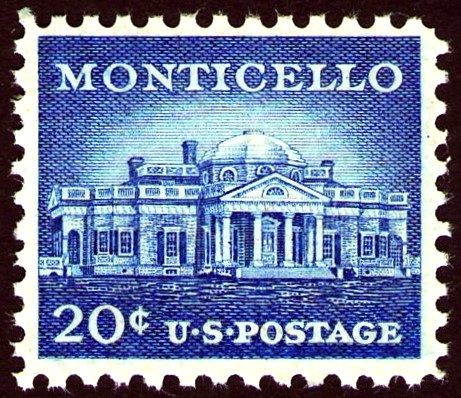
On April 13, 1956, the U.S. Post Office issued a postage stamp honoring Monticello.

Monticello's image has appeared on U.S. currency and postage stamps. An image of the west front of Monticello by Felix Schlag has been featured on the reverse of the nickel minted since 1938 (with a brief interruption in 2004 and 2005, when designs of the Westward Journey series appeared instead). It was also used as the title for the 2015 play Jefferson's Garden, which centered on his life.

Monticello also appeared on the reverse of the two-dollar bill from 1928 to 1966, when the bill was discontinued. The bill was reintroduced in 1976 and retains Jefferson's portrait on the obverse but replaced Monticello on the reverse with an engraved modified reproduction of John Trumbull's 1818 painting Declaration of Independence. The gift shop tour ticket booths at Monticello hands out two-dollar bills as change.

The 1994 commemorative Thomas Jefferson 250th Anniversary silver dollar features Monticello on the reverse.

At Monticello, George Washington's Mount Vernon and other plantations, an effort was enacted in recent years to deal more honestly with the institution of slavery that the planter class relied on to build their homes and their wealth. According to the Washington Post in 2019: "The changes have begun to draw people long alienated by the sites' whitewashing of the past and to satisfy what staff call a hunger for real history, as plantations add slavery-focused tours, rebuild cabins and reconstruct the lives of the enslaved with help from their descendants. But some visitors, who remain overwhelmingly white, are pushing back."

== Gallery ==
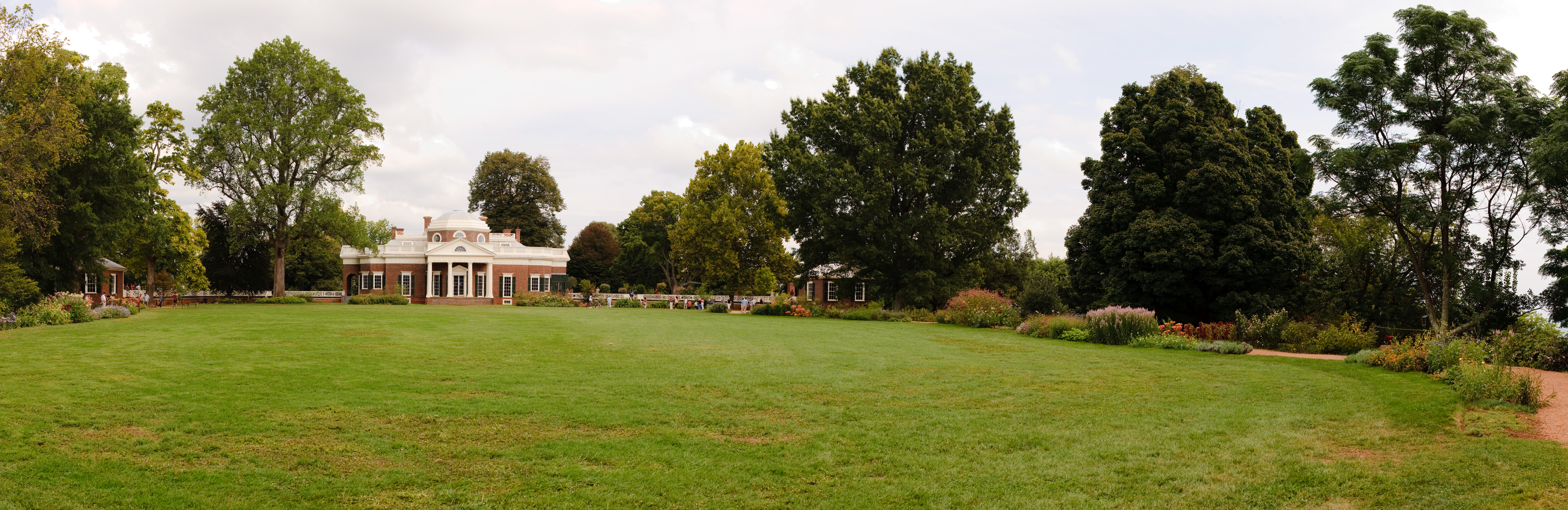
West Front of Monticello

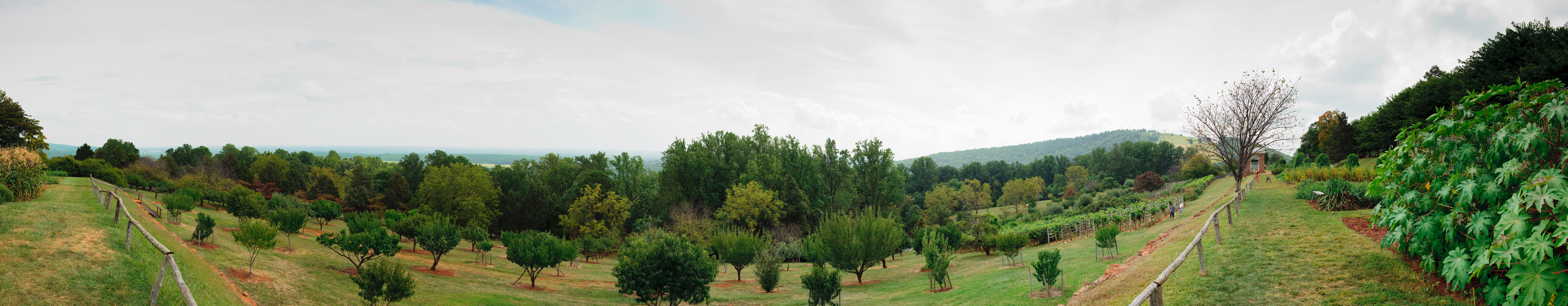
Vegetable Garden – 180 degrees

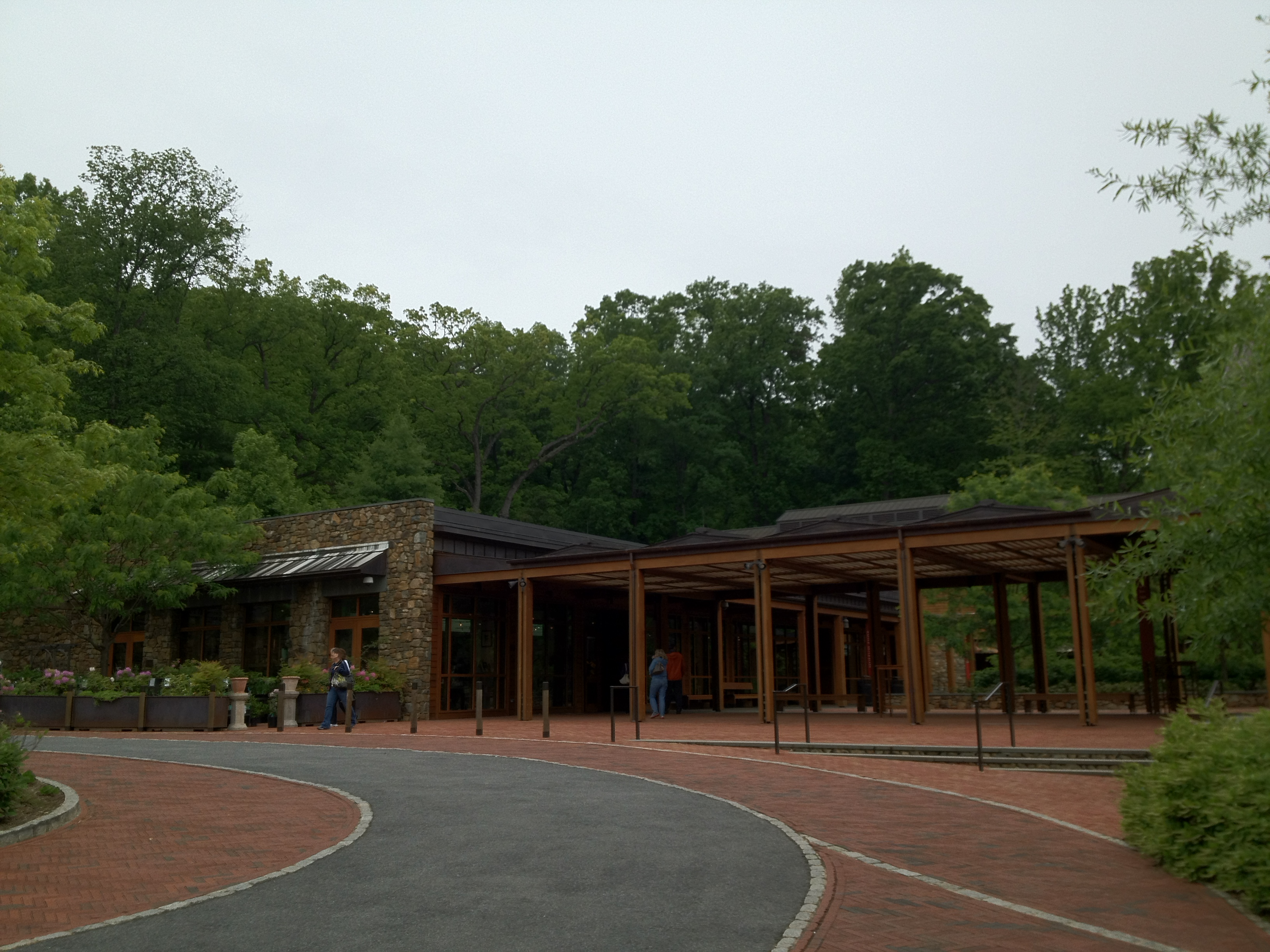
The Visitors' Center

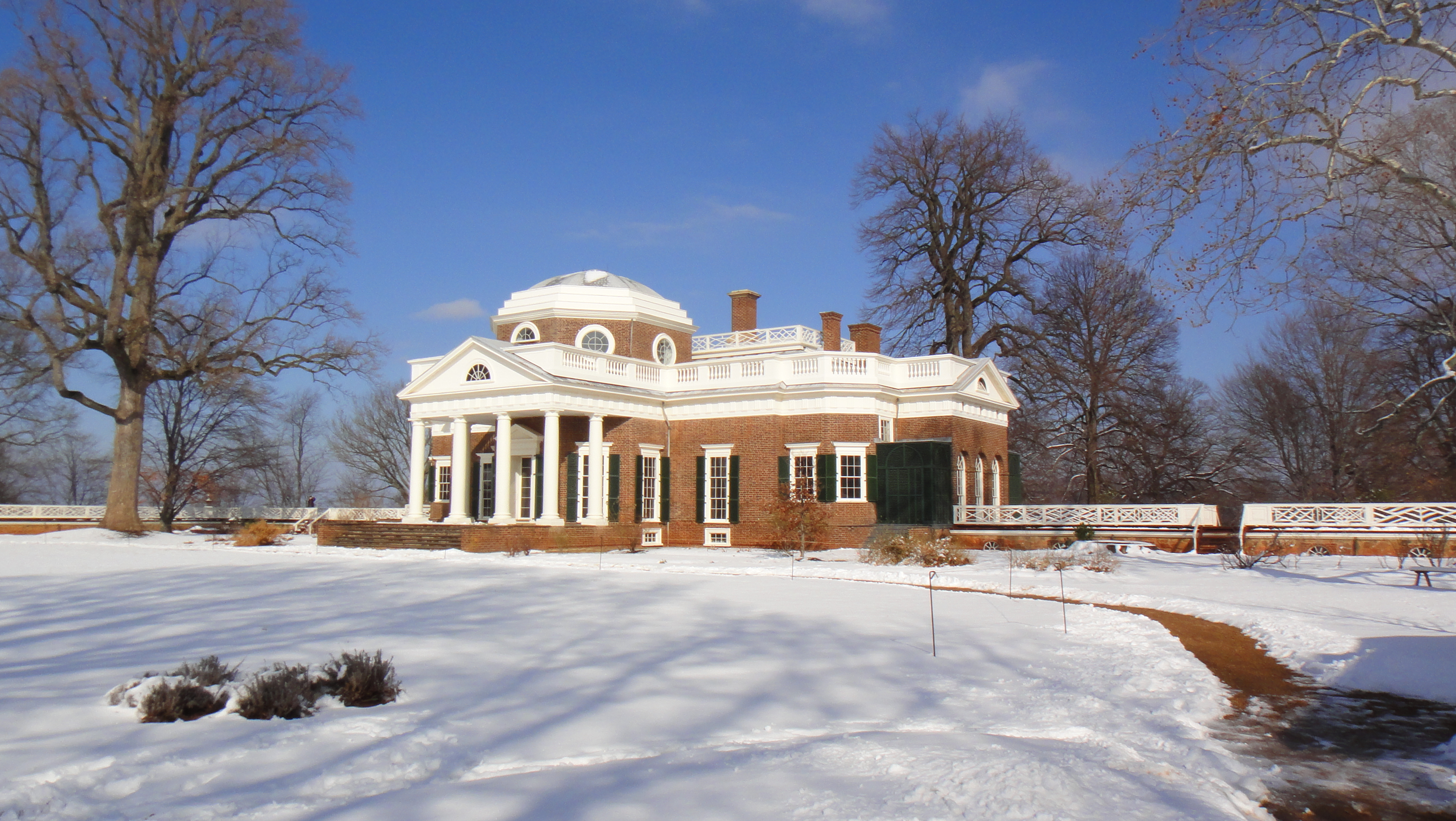
Monticello, the day after a snowstorm

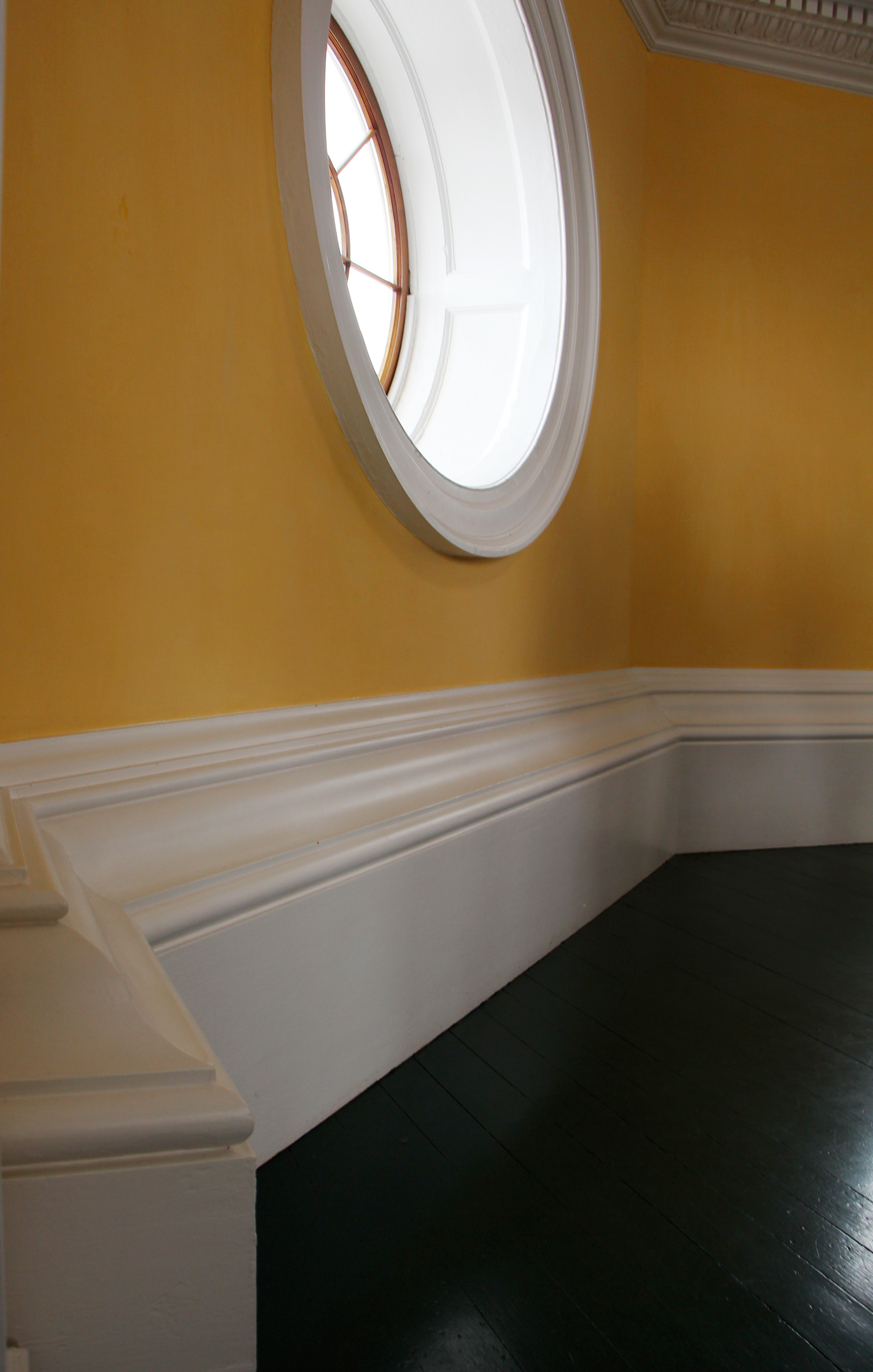
In the dome room, wall detail

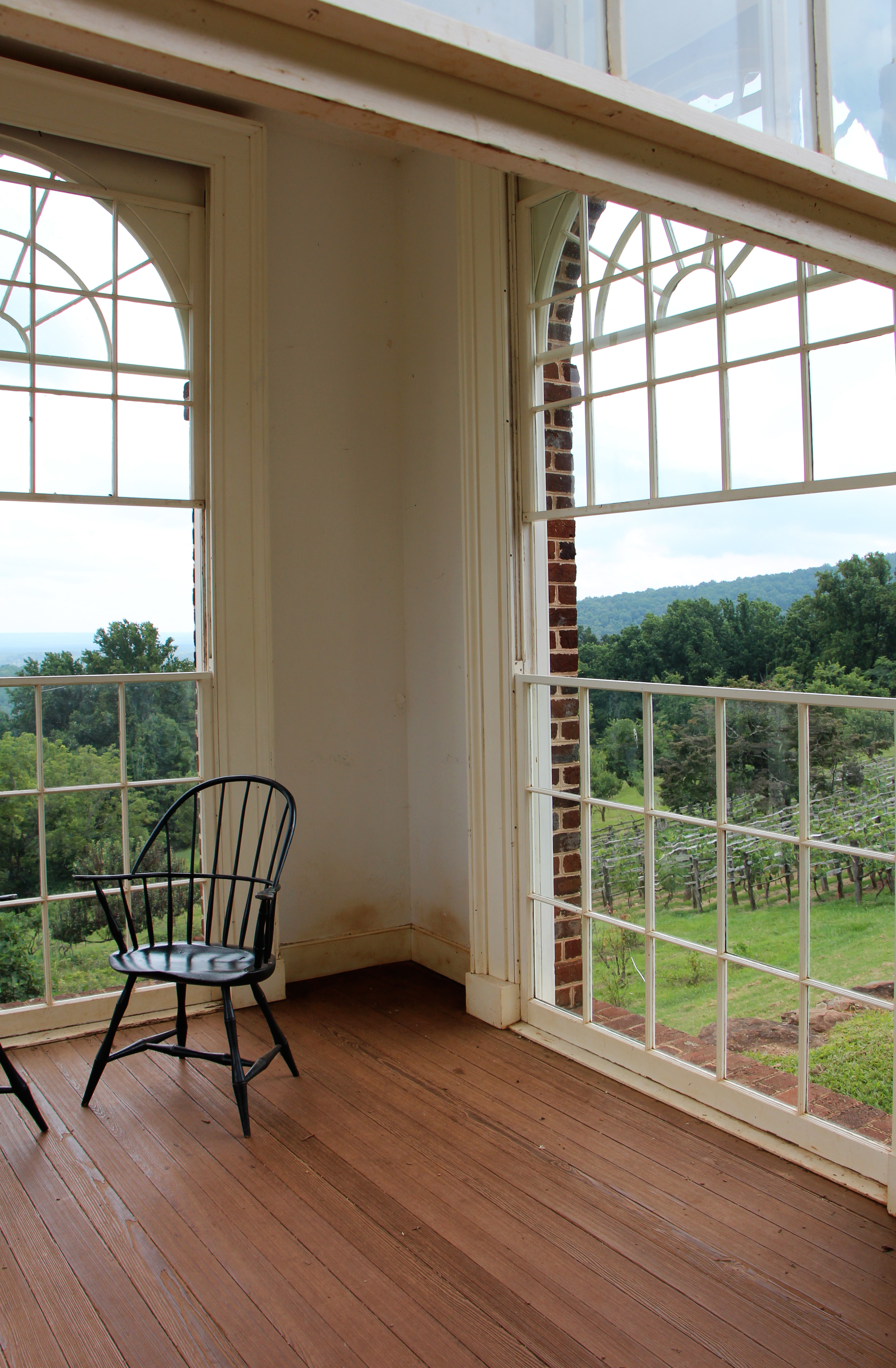
Inside the Pavilion at the Vegetable Garden
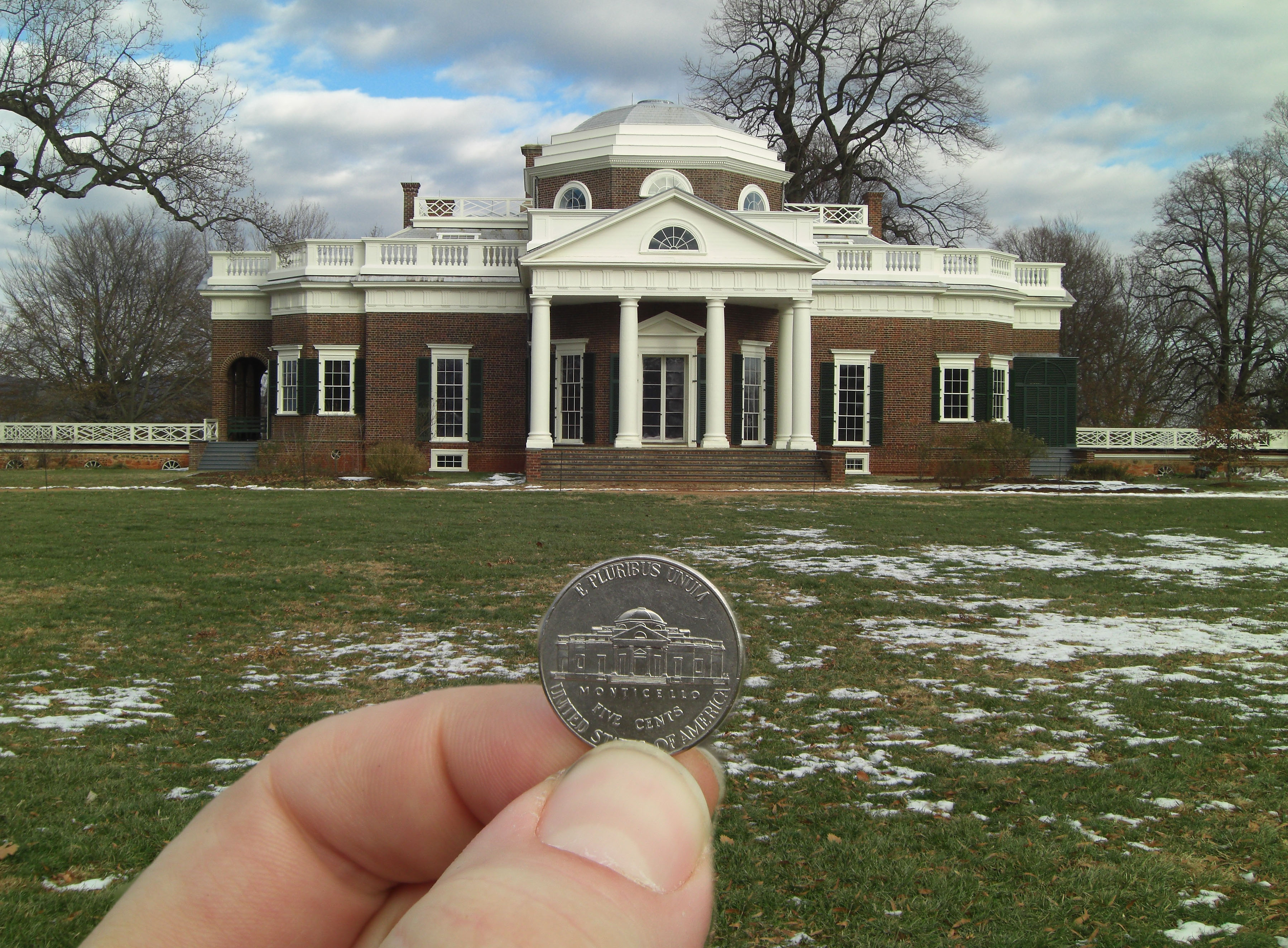
Monticello facade and its reproduction on a nickel

A nickel by Monticello

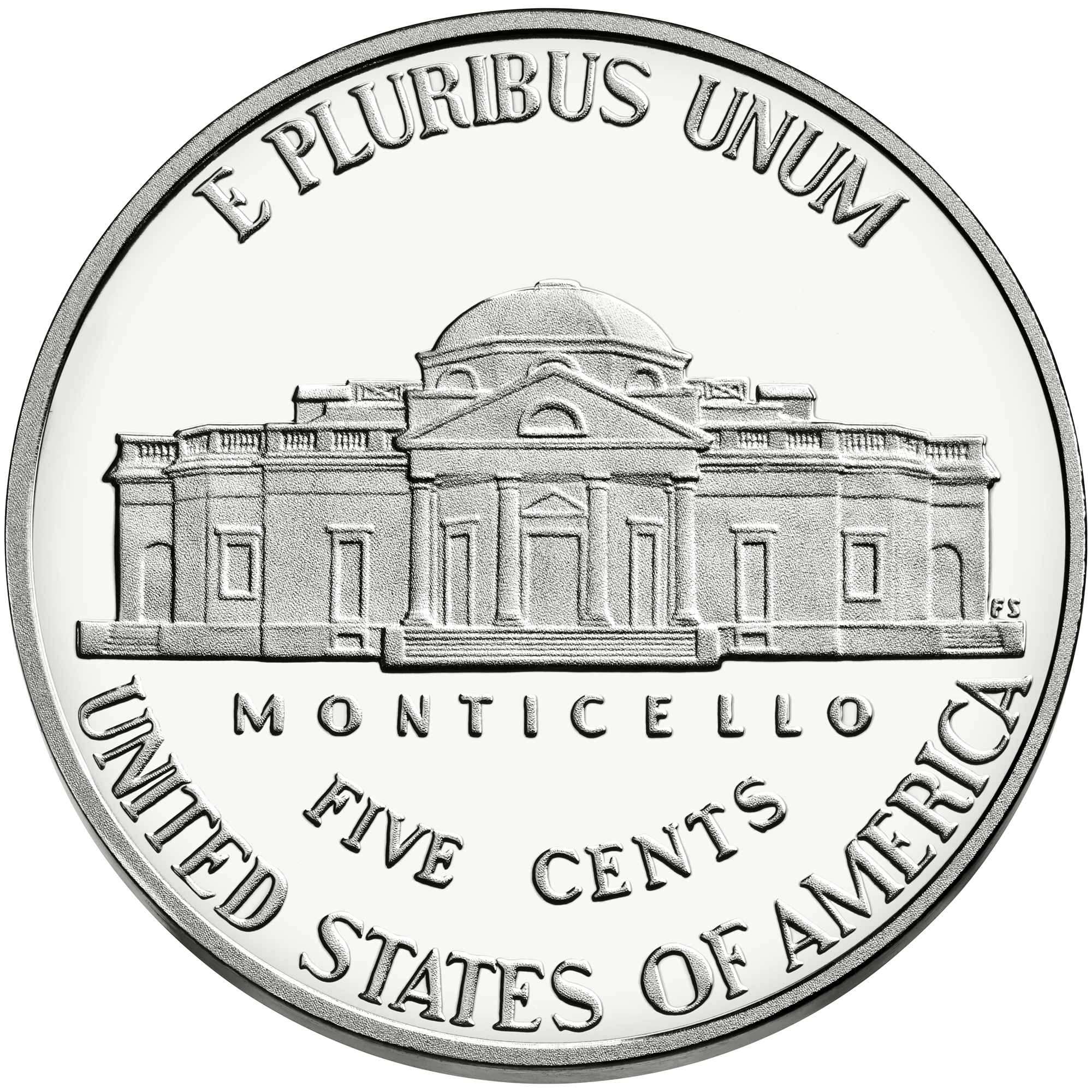
Monticello as portrayed on the reverse of the Jefferson nickel

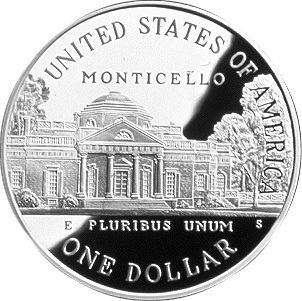
Monticello is depicted on the 1994 commemorative Thomas Jefferson 250th Anniversary silver dollar.

== See also ==
- Thomas Jefferson
- Bibliography of Thomas Jefferson
- Jeffersonian architecture
- University of Virginia
- List of residences of presidents of the United States
- List of burial places of presidents and vice presidents of the United States
- 18th-century Western domes
- People from Monticello
- Presidential memorials in the United States
- Thomas Jefferson Center for Historic Plants
