= Thomas Jefferson 250th Anniversary silver dollar =

United States commemorative coin

Thomas Jefferson 250th Anniversary dollar
- United States
- Value: 1 U.S. Dollar
- Mass: 26.73 g
- Diameter: 38.1 mm (1.5 in)
- Thickness: 2 mm
- Edge: Reeded
- Composition: 90% silver 10% copper
- Mintage: 266,927 Uncirculated 332,891 Proof
- Mint marks: P, S, W

Obverse
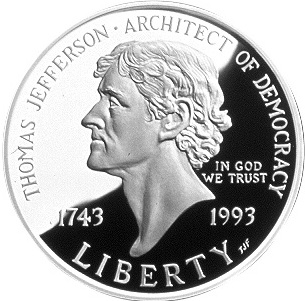
- Design: Profile of Thomas Jefferson based on a portrait by Gilbert Stuart
- Designer: T. James Ferrell

Reverse
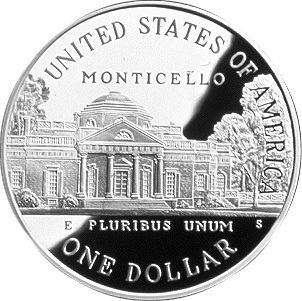
- Design: Monticello, Jefferson's primary residence
- Designer: T. James Ferrell

The Thomas Jefferson 250th Anniversary silver dollar is a commemorative silver dollar issued by the United States Mint in 1994. The obverse portrays Founding Father and United States president Thomas Jefferson and the words "Architect of Democracy", and the reverse depicts Jefferson's Virginia home, Monticello.

== See also ==
- List of United States commemorative coins and medals (1990s)
- United States commemorative coins
