= List of presidents of the United States on currency =

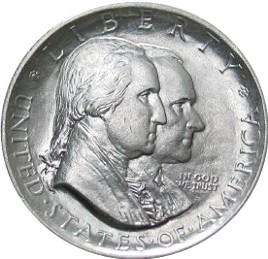
George Washington and Calvin Coolidge on the 1926 Sesquicentennial of American Independence commemorative half dollar

Several presidents of the United States have appeared on currency. The president of the United States has appeared on official banknotes, coins for circulation, and commemorative coins in the United States, the Confederate States of America, the Philippine Islands, the Commonwealth of the Philippines and around the world.

== United States ==
Note: Series dates listed for United States paper money represents a specific issue or set of issues. Different series may represent minor or major design changes, or no design change (series listed on the same line). Only a variety of a president's portrait used on paper money is noted next to the series date.

Twenty-three U.S. presidents have appeared on U.S. coin and paper currency (As of March 2017). By law (31 U.S.C. § 5114), "only the portrait of a deceased individual may appear on United States currency". The Secretary of the Treasury usually determines which people and which of their portraits appear on the nation's currency, however legislation passed by Congress can also determine currency design. Presidents appearing on U.S. currency are (in order of service):

=== George Washington ===
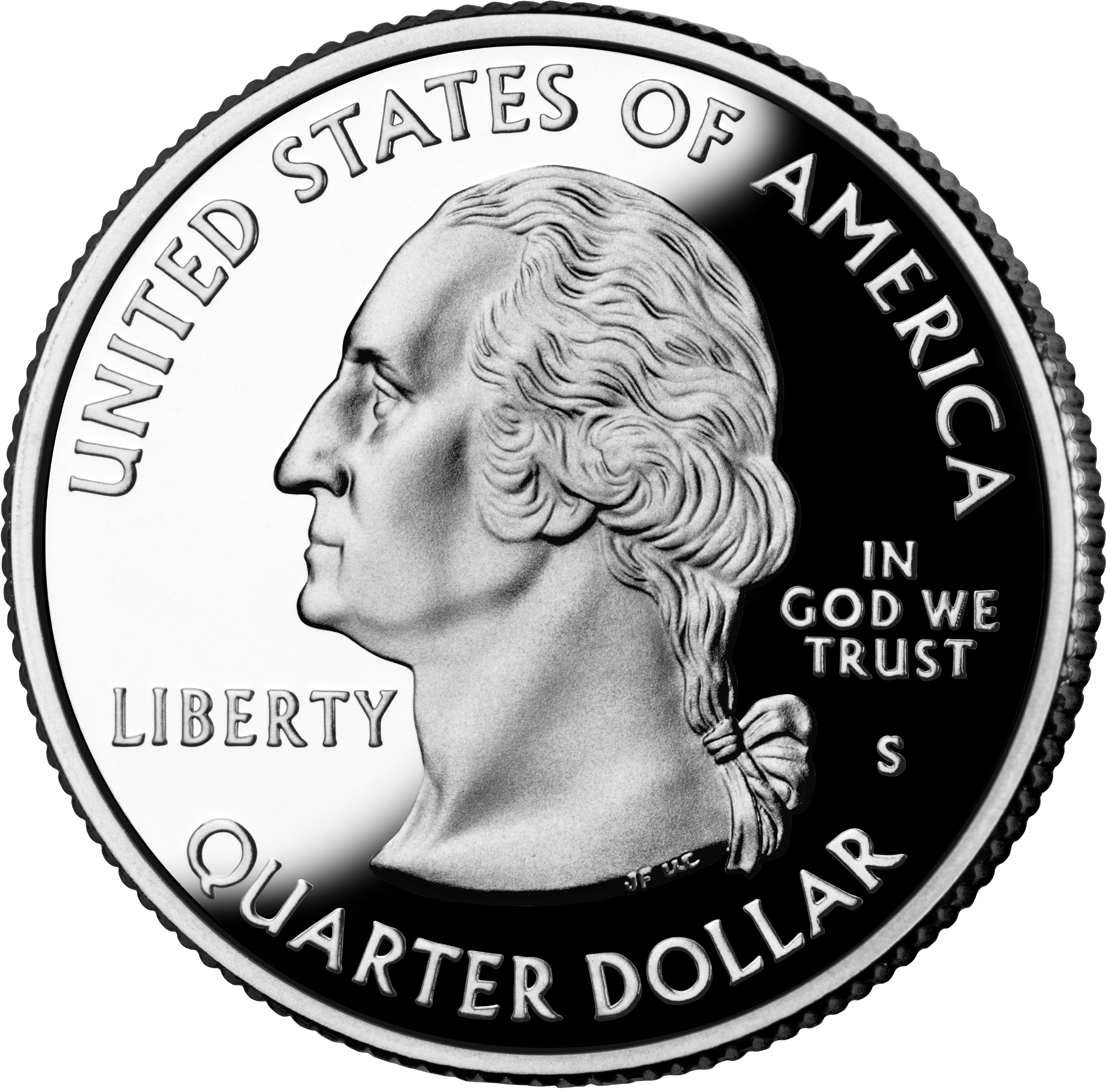
Washington on America the Beautiful state quarters obverse

==== Early coinage ====
- 1783, 1792 Washington piece
- 1783, 1791, 1792, 1795 Washington cent
- Washington double-head cent
- 1791 Washington Liverpool halfpenny
- 1792 Washington Getz pattern piece
- 1793, 1795 Washington halfpenny
- 1795 Washington halfpenny, grate token
- 1795 Washington North Wales halfpenny
- Success Medal

===== Five cents =====
- 1866, 1909, and 1910 Washington nickel pattern pieces

===== Quarter dollars =====
- 1932, 1934–1998 Washington quarter (obverse). The reverse carried a heraldic eagle for all years except 1975 and 1976, which featured the dual date 1776–1976 on the obverse and special reverse design for the United States Bicentennial.
- 1999–2008 50 State quarters Series (obverse)
  - 1999 New Jersey state quarter (reverse) (Washington Crossing the Delaware)
  - 2006 South Dakota state quarter (reverse) (Mount Rushmore)
- 2009 District of Columbia and United States Territories quarters
- 2010–2021 America the Beautiful quarters
  - 2013 South Dakota ATB quarter (reverse) (Mount Rushmore)
- 2021-2025 American Women Series (obverse).
- 2026 United States Semiquincentennial coinage American Revolutionary War quarter (obverse)

===== Dollar coins =====
- 2007 Presidential dollar coin (obverse), 1st of four U.S. presidents issued in 2007.

==== Commemorative coins ====
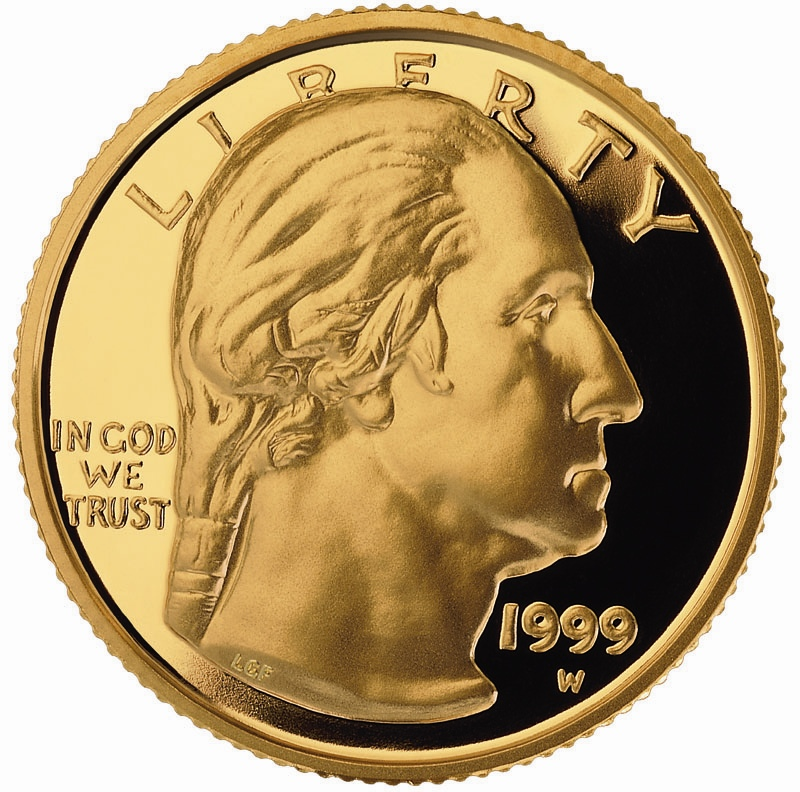
1999 Washington $5 commemorative gold coin

- 1900 commemorative silver Lafayette dollar
- 1926 commemorative half dollar – 150th anniversary of the signing of the Declaration of Independence
- 1982 commemorative half dollar – 250th anniversary of Washington's birth
- 1991 Mount Rushmore commemorative series
  - Half dollar
  - Silver dollar
  - $5 gold piece
- 1999 $5 gold commemorative piece – 200th anniversary of Washington's death; an alternate design not chosen for the 1932 Washington quarter
- 2008 $10 Gold Coin, First Spouse Program, Dolley Madison, (reverse)

==== Banknotes ====
- Compound Interest Treasury Note
  - $100 (with a vignette of George Washington standing)
  - $500
- Interest Bearing Note
  - $1000

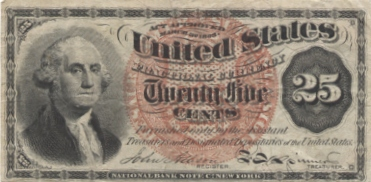
George Washington – 25¢ Fractional Currency

- Fractional currency
  - 10¢ and 50¢ first issues
  - 5¢, 10¢, 25¢, and 50¢ second issue
  - 3¢, and 10¢ third issue
  - 25¢ fourth issue
- United States Note
  - $1 Series of 1869
  - $1 Series of 1874, 1875 A—E, 1878
  - $1 Series of 1880
  - $1 Series of 1917
  - $1 Series of 1923

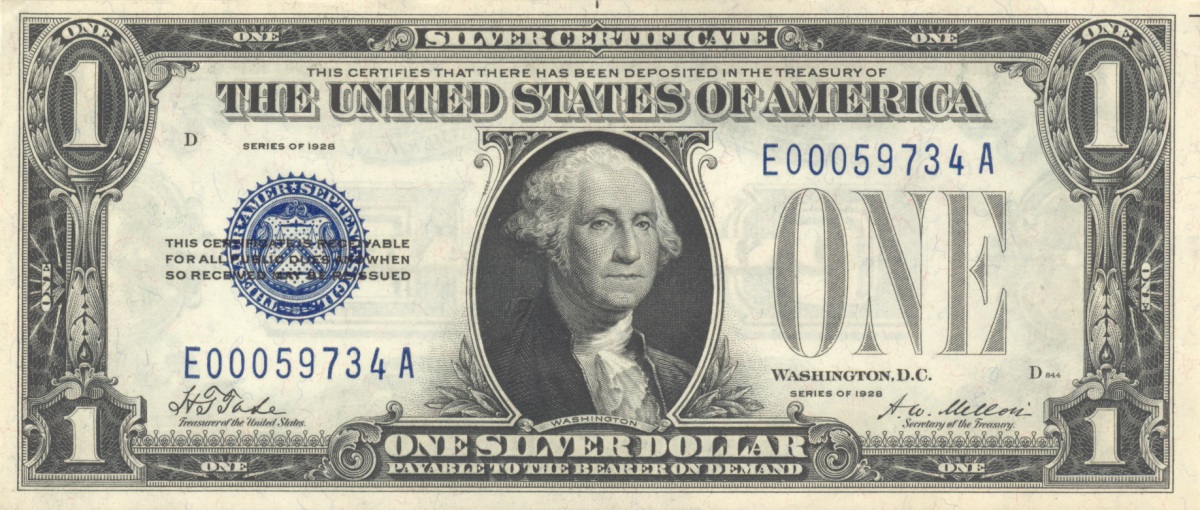
George Washington – Series of 1928 $1 bill

- Silver certificate
  - $1 Series of 1896 "Educational Series" (portrait on back)
  - $1 Series of 1923
  - $1 Series of 1928
  - $1 Series of 1934, A—E
  - $1 Series 1935, A—H
  - $1 Series 1957, A—B
  - $2 Series of 1899
  - National Banknotes
- $5 Series of 1882

Blue seal Washington on reverse

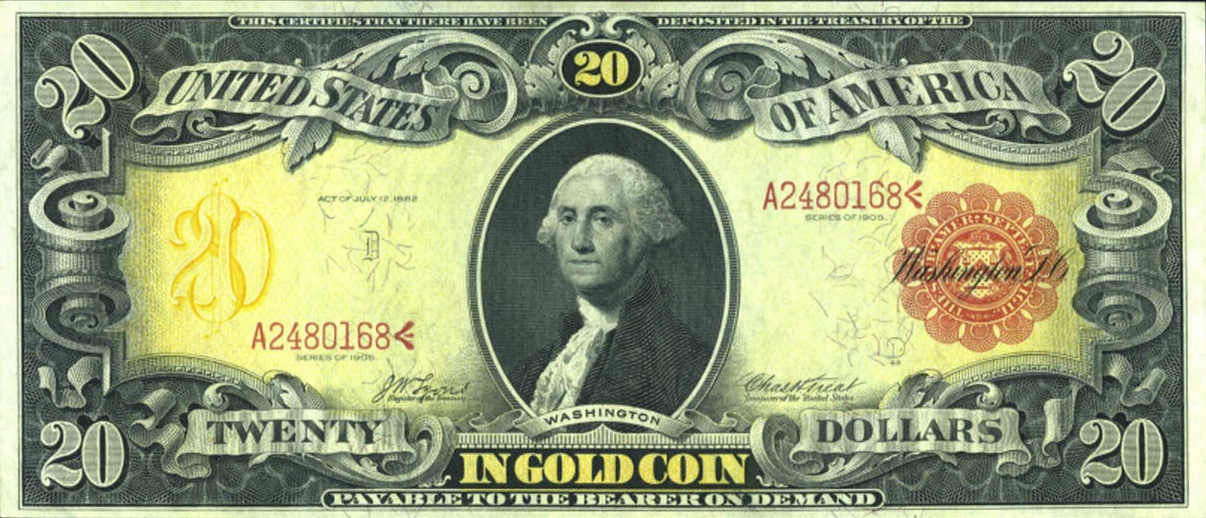
George Washington – Series of 1905 $20 bill

- Gold Certificate
  - $20 Series of 1905 (with reversed left-facing instead of right-facing portrait)
  - $20 Series of 1906 (with reversed left-facing instead of right-facing portrait)
  - $20 Series of 1922 (with reversed left-facing instead of right-facing portrait)
- Federal Reserve Bank Note
  - $1 Series of 1918
- Federal Reserve Note
  - All $1 Federal Reserve Notes since Series 1963

=== John Adams ===
Coin for circulation

- 2007 Dollar (obverse), 2nd of four U.S. presidents issued in 2007.

Banknotes

- National Bank Notes
  - All $100 first charter period (on back in the engraved version of the painting Declaration of Independence by John Trumbull
- Federal Reserve Notes
  - All $2 (on back in the engraved version of Trumbull's Declaration of Independence painting)

=== Thomas Jefferson ===
==== Coins for circulation ====
===== Five cents =====
- 1938–1942, 1946–2003 (copper-nickel) nickel with Monticello on the reverse
- 1942–1945 (35% silver) nickel; wartime composition. The mint mark for these types are located above the Monticello. It helps distinguish between the 1942 types.
- 2004 nickel Westward Journey Series
  - Louisiana Purchase
  - Lewis and Clark
- 2005 nickel Westward Journey Series
  - American bison (similar to pre-Jefferson buffalo nickel reverse)
  - "Ocean in view! O! The Joy!" (quote by William Clark)
- 2006—present nickel "Return to Monticello" with a forward-facing Jefferson and the Monticello returns on the reverse.

===== Quarter dollar =====
- 2006 South Dakota state quarter reverse (Mount Rushmore)
- 2026 United States Semiquincentennial coinage Declaration of Independence quarter (obverse)

===== Dollar =====
- 2007 Dollar (obverse), 3rd of four U.S. presidents issued in 2007.

==== Commemorative coins ====
- 1903 commemorative gold dollar – issued for the Louisiana Purchase Exposition
- 1991 Mount Rushmore commemorative coins series
  - Half dollar
  - Silver dollar
  - $5 gold piece
- 1993 commemorative silver dollar – 250th anniversary of Jefferson's birth

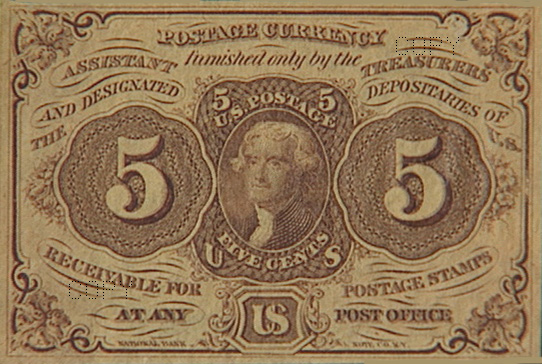
Jefferson on 5 cent fractional postage note

==== Banknotes ====
- Fractional currency
  - 5¢ and 25¢ first issue

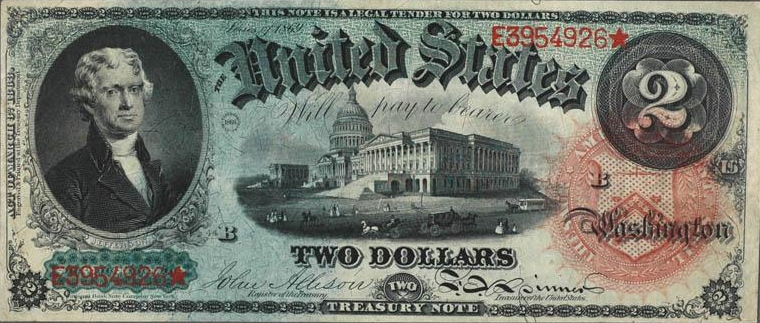
Thomas Jefferson – Series of 1869 $2 bill

- United States Note
  - $2 Series of 1869
  - $2 Series of 1874, 1875, 1878
  - $2 Series of 1880
  - $2 Series of 1917
  - $2 Series of 1928, A—G
  - $2 Series 1953, A—C
  - $2 Series 1963, A

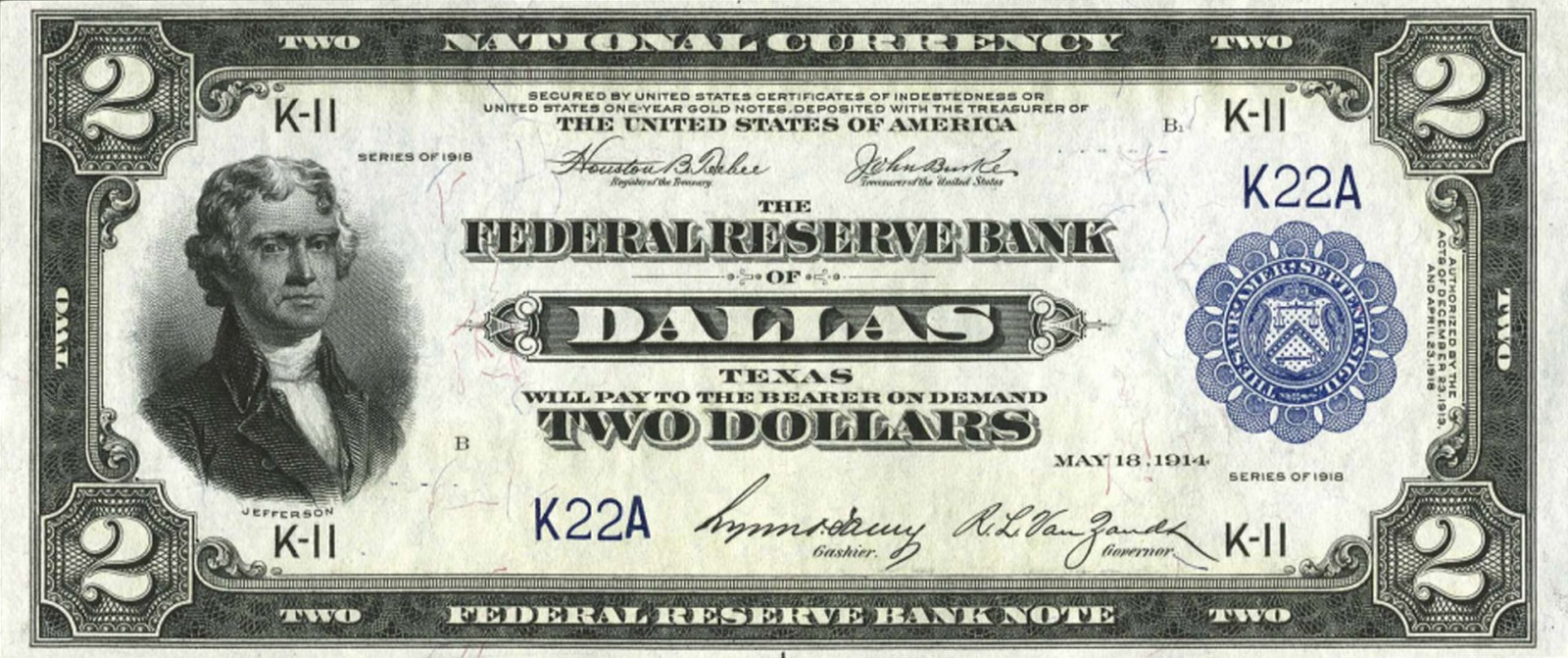
Thomas Jefferson – Series of 1918 $2 bill

- Federal Reserve Bank Note
  - $2 Series of 1918
- Federal Reserve Note
  - All $2 Federal Reserve Notes since Series 1976 appearing on front and reverse.

=== James Madison ===
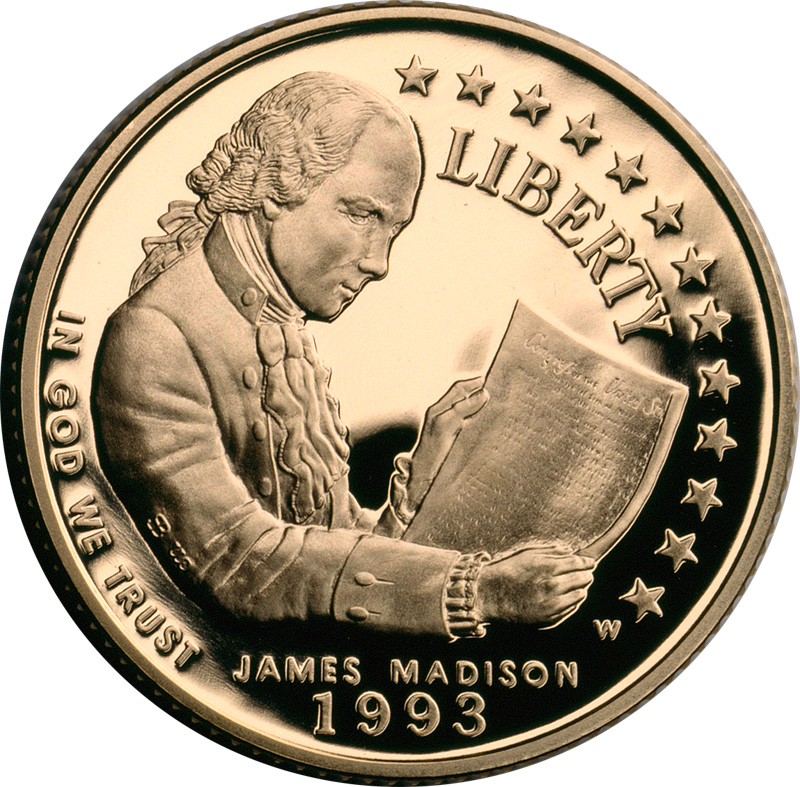
James Madison $5 commemorative gold coin

Coin for circulation

- 2007 Dollar (obverse), 4th of four U.S. presidents issued in 2007.
- 2026 United States Semiquincentennial coinage Constitution quarter (obverse)

Commemorative coins

- 1993 Bill of Rights commemorative coin series
  - Half dollar
  - Silver dollar
  - $5 gold piece
  - $500000 gold ingot

Banknotes

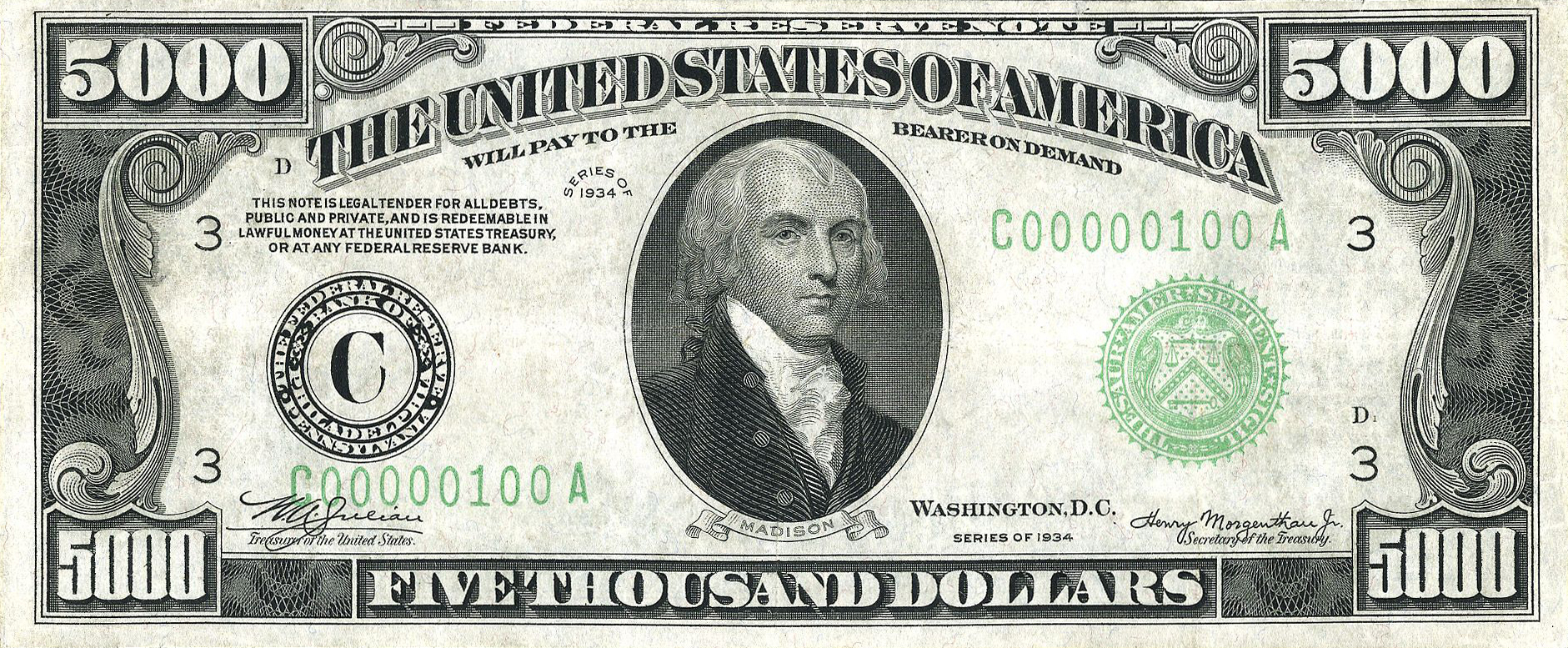
James Madison – Series of 1934 $5000 bill

- United States Note
  - $5000 1878 (no series date)
- Gold Certificate
  - $5000 Series of 1870 and 1875
  - $5000 1882 [DEPARTMENT SERIES]
  - $5000 Series of 1888
  - $5000 Series of 1882
  - $5000 Series of 1928
- Federal Reserve Note
  - $5000 Series of 1914
  - All $5000 small size Federal Reserve Notes

=== James Monroe ===
Coins for circulation

- 2008 Dollar (obverse), 1st of four U.S. presidents issued in 2008.

Commemorative coin

- 1923 Monroe Doctrine Centennial half dollar, featuring profiles of Monroe

=== John Quincy Adams ===
Coins for circulation

- 2008 Dollar (obverse), 2nd of four U.S. presidents issued in 2008.

Commemorative coin

- 1923 Monroe Doctrine Centennial half dollar, featuring profiles of Adams and James Monroe

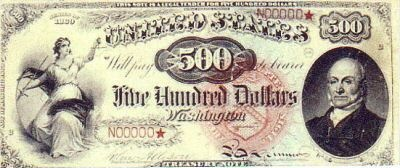
John Quincy Adams – Series of 1869 $500 bill

Banknotes

- United States Note
  - $500 Series of 1869

=== Andrew Jackson ===
Coins for circulation

- 2008 Dollar (obverse), (released August 14, 2008) 3rd of four U.S. presidents issued in 2008.

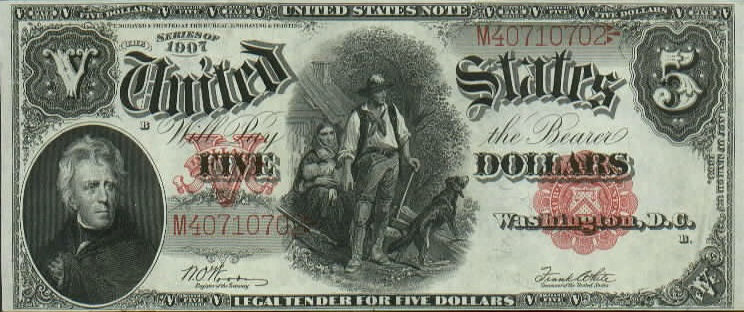
Andrew Jackson – Series of 1907 $5 bill

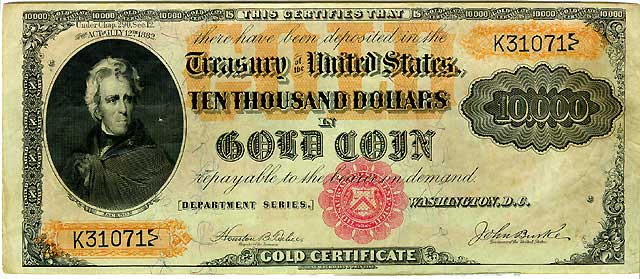
Andrew Jackson – 1882 $10,000 bill

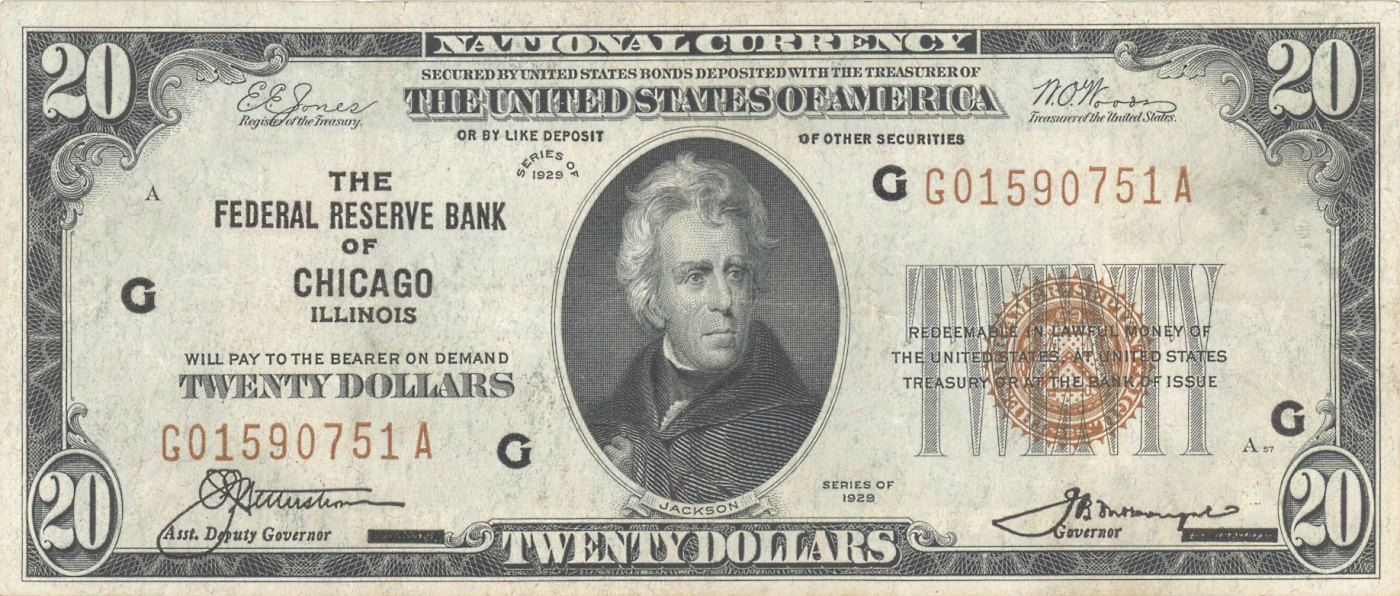
Andrew Jackson – Series of 1929 $20 bill

Banknotes

- United States Note
  - $5 Series of 1869
  - $5 Series of 1875, 1878
  - $5 Series of 1880
  - $5 Series of 1907
  - $10 Series of 1923
  - $10,000 1878 (no series date)
- Gold Certificate
  - $20 Series of 1928
  - $10,000 Series of 1870 and 1875
  - $10,000 1882 [DEPARTMENT SERIES]
  - $10,000 Series of 1888
  - $10,000 Series of 1900
- Federal Reserve Bank Note
  - $10 Series of 1915
  - $10 Series of 1918
  - $20 Series of 1929
- National Bank Note
  - $20 Series of 1929
- Federal Reserve Note
  - $10 Series of 1914
  - All $20 small size Federal Reserve Notes
    - Series of 1928–1995
    - Series 1996–2003 (with redesigned enlarged portrait)
    - Series 2004–2006 (with redesigned enlarged portrait)
    - Series 2020 (moved to backside, Harriet Tubman on frontside)

=== Martin Van Buren ===
Coins for circulation

- 2008 Dollar (obverse), (released November 13, 2008) 4th of four U.S. presidents issued in 2008.

=== William H. Harrison ===
Coins for circulation

- 2009 Dollar (obverse), 1st of four U.S. presidents issued in 2009.

=== John Tyler ===
Coins for circulation

- 2009 Dollar (obverse), 2nd of four U.S. presidents to be issued in 2009.

=== James K. Polk ===
Coins for circulation

- 2009 Dollar (obverse), (released on August 20, 2009) 3rd of four U.S. presidents issued in 2009.

=== Zachary Taylor ===
Coins for circulation

- 2009 Dollar (obverse), (released November 19, 2009) 4th of four U.S. presidents issued in 2009.

=== Millard Fillmore ===
Coins for circulation

- 2010 Dollar (obverse), 1st of four U.S. presidents issued in 2010.

=== Franklin Pierce ===
Coins for circulation

- 2010 Dollar (obverse), 2nd of four U.S. presidents issued in 2010.

=== James Buchanan ===
Coins for circulation

- 2010 Dollar (obverse), 3rd of four U.S. presidents issued in 2010.

=== Abraham Lincoln ===
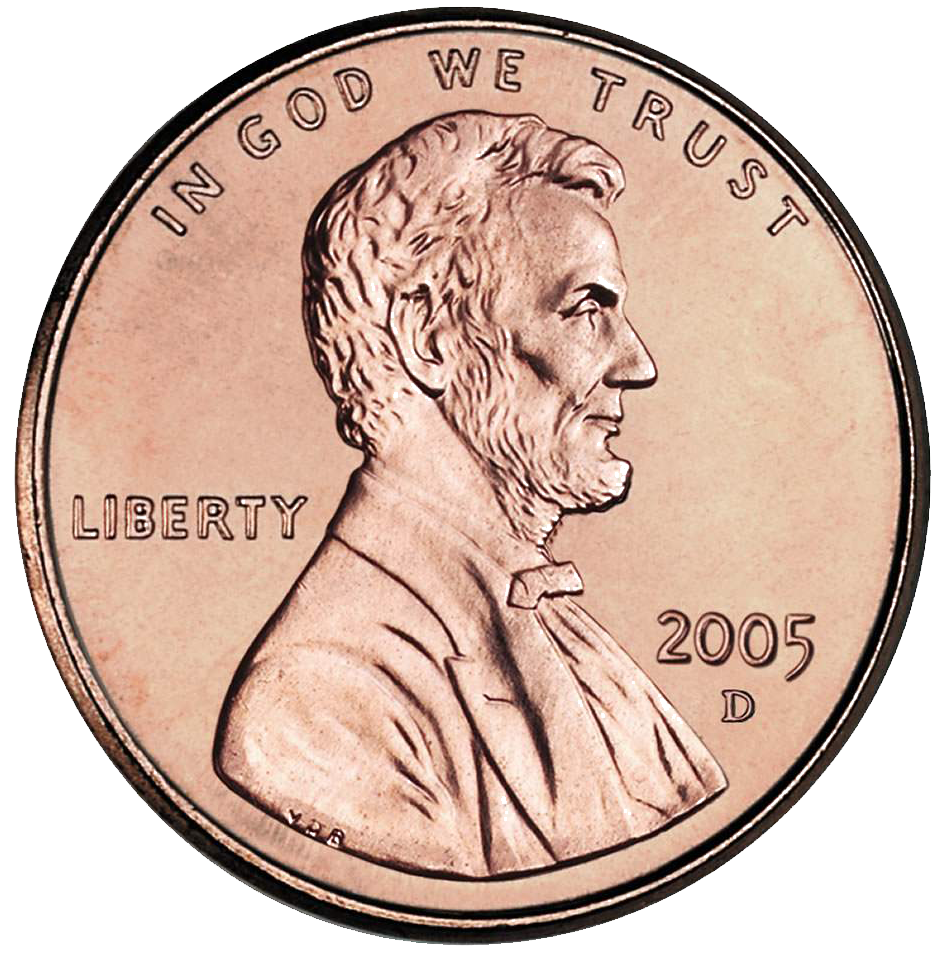
Lincoln on U.S. one cent

==== Coins for circulation ====
===== One cent =====
- 1909–1942, 1944–1958 (95% copper, 5% zinc and tin) Wheat Ears cent a.k.a. "Wheat penny"
- 1943 (zinc-plated steel) Wheat cent
- 1959–1962 (95% copper, 5% zinc and tin ) Lincoln Memorial cent
- 1963-mid 1982 (95% copper, 5% zinc ) Lincoln Memorial cent
- 1974 (aluminum) Lincoln Memorial Cent
- 1982–2008 (copper-plated zinc) Lincoln Memorial cent
- 2009 Lincoln bicentennial of birth commemorative cent series, four different designs on reverse
  - Birth and early childhood in Kentucky
  - Formative years in Indiana
  - Professional life in Illinois
  - Presidency in Washington, D.C.
- 2010–present (copper-plated zinc) Shield Penny

===== Quarter dollar =====
- 2003 Illinois state quarter reverse "Land of Lincoln"
- 2006 South Dakota state quarter reverse (Mount Rushmore)
- 2026 United States Semiquincentennial coinage Gettysburg Address quarter (obverse)

===== Dollar =====
- 2010 Dollar (obverse), 4th of four U.S. presidents issued in 2010.

==== Commemorative coins ====
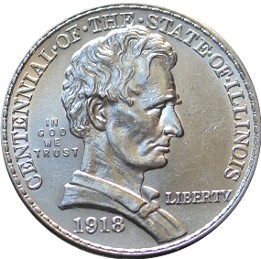
Abraham Lincoln commemorative half dollar

- 1918 commemorative half dollar – Illinois 100th statehood anniversary
- 1991 Mount Rushmore commemorative coin series
  - Half dollar
  - Silver dollar
  - $5 gold piece
- 2009 Silver dollar commemorating Lincoln's 200th anniversary of birth (Gettysburg Address)

==== Banknotes ====
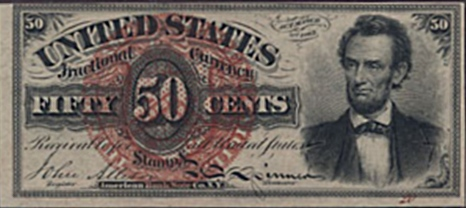
Abraham Lincoln – 50¢ Fractional currency

- $10 Demand Note
- $20 Compound Interest Treasury Note
- $20 Interest Bearing Note
- Fractional currency
  - 50¢ fourth issue (with left-facing portrait)

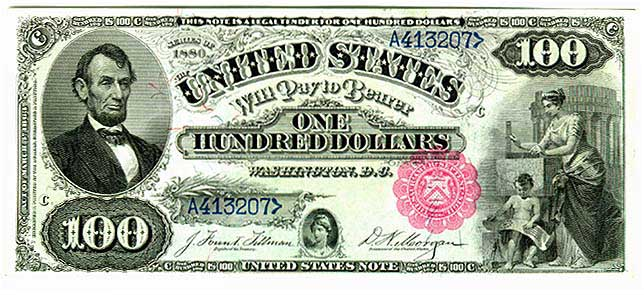
Abraham Lincoln – Series of 1880 $100 bill

- United States Note
  - $5 Series of 1928, A—F
  - $5 Series 1953, A—C
  - $5 Series 1963
  - $10 Act of 1862 and 1863
  - $100 Series of 1869
  - $100 Series of 1875, 1878
  - $100 Series of 1880
- Gold Certificate
  - $500 Series of 1882
  - $500 Series of 1922

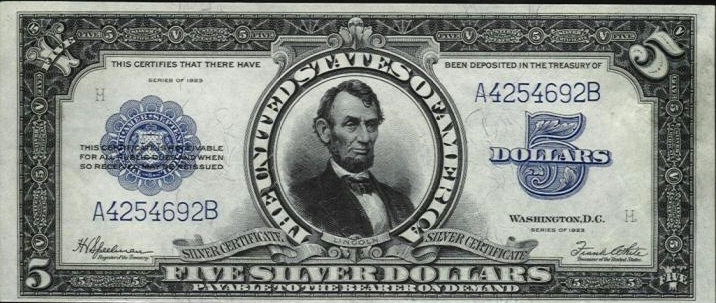
Abraham Lincoln – Series of 1923 $5 bill

- Silver certificate
  - $1 Series of 1899
  - $5 Series of 1923
  - $5 Series of 1934 A—D
  - $5 Series 1953 A—C
- Federal Reserve Bank Note
  - $5 Series of 1915
  - $5 Series of 1918
  - $5 Series of 1929
- National Bank Note
  - $5 Series of 1929

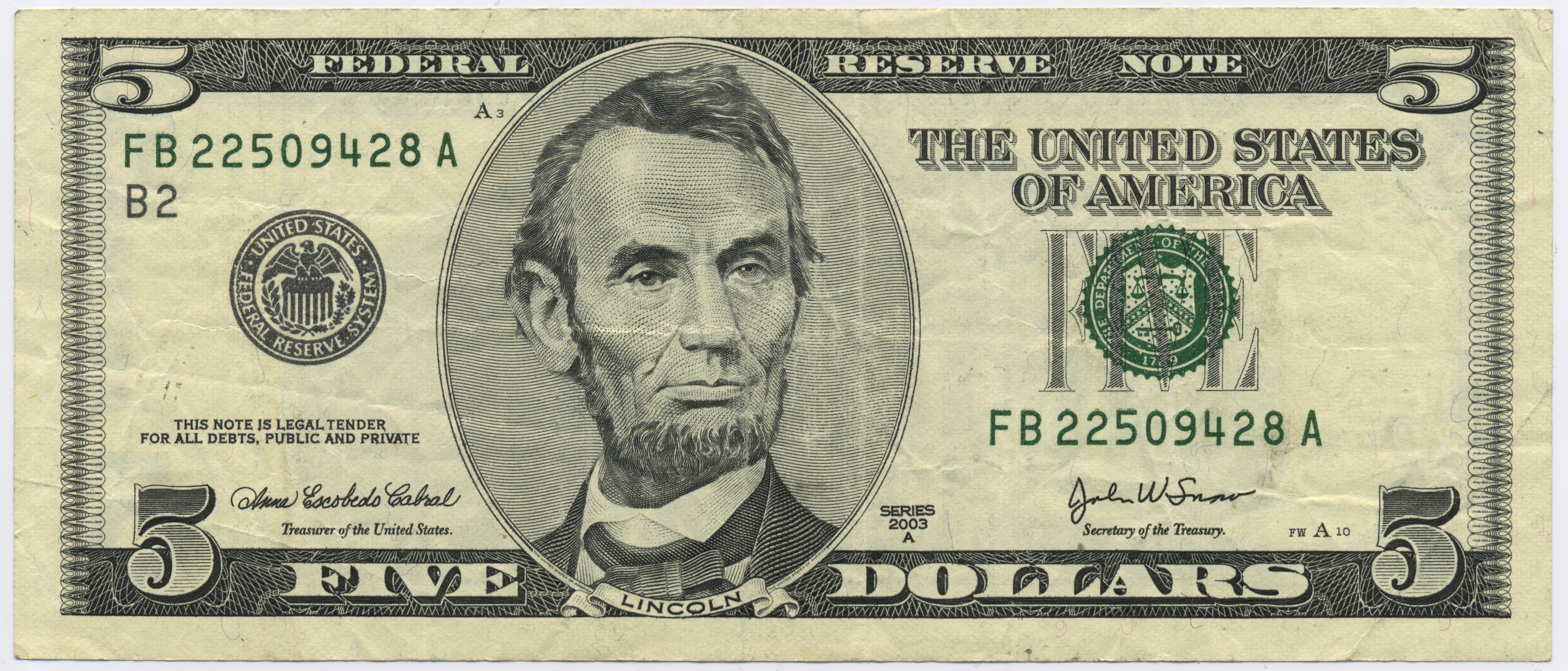
Abraham Lincoln – Series 2003 $5 bill

- Federal Reserve Note
  - $5 Series of 1914
  - All small size $5 Federal Reserve Notes
    - Series of 1928—Series 1995
    - Series 1996—2003A (with redesigned enlarged portrait)

=== Andrew Johnson ===
Coins for circulation

- 2011 Dollar (obverse), 1st of four U.S. presidents issued in 2011.

=== Ulysses S. Grant ===
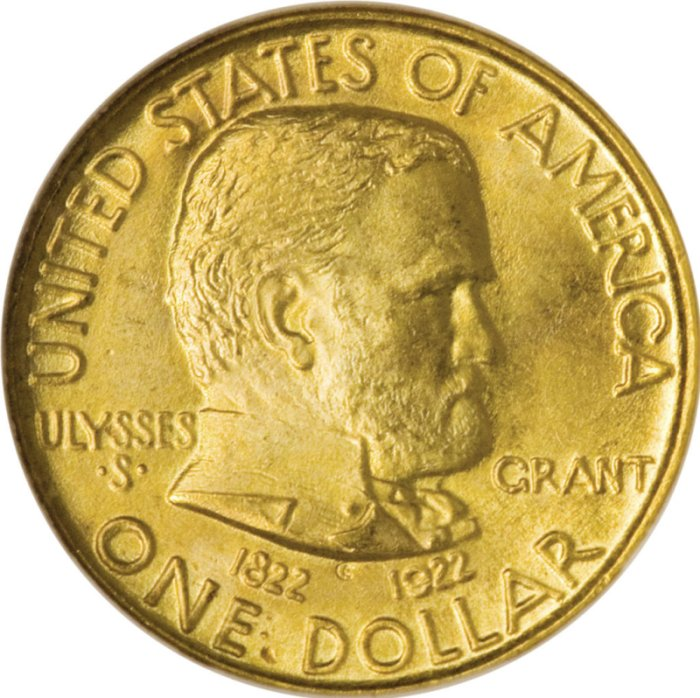
Grant commemorative dollar coin

Coins for circulation

- 2011 Dollar (obverse), 2nd of four U.S. presidents issued in 2011.

Commemorative coins

- 1922 commemorative half dollar – 100th anniversary of Grant's birth
- 1922 commemorative gold dollar – 100th anniversary of Grant's birth

Banknotes

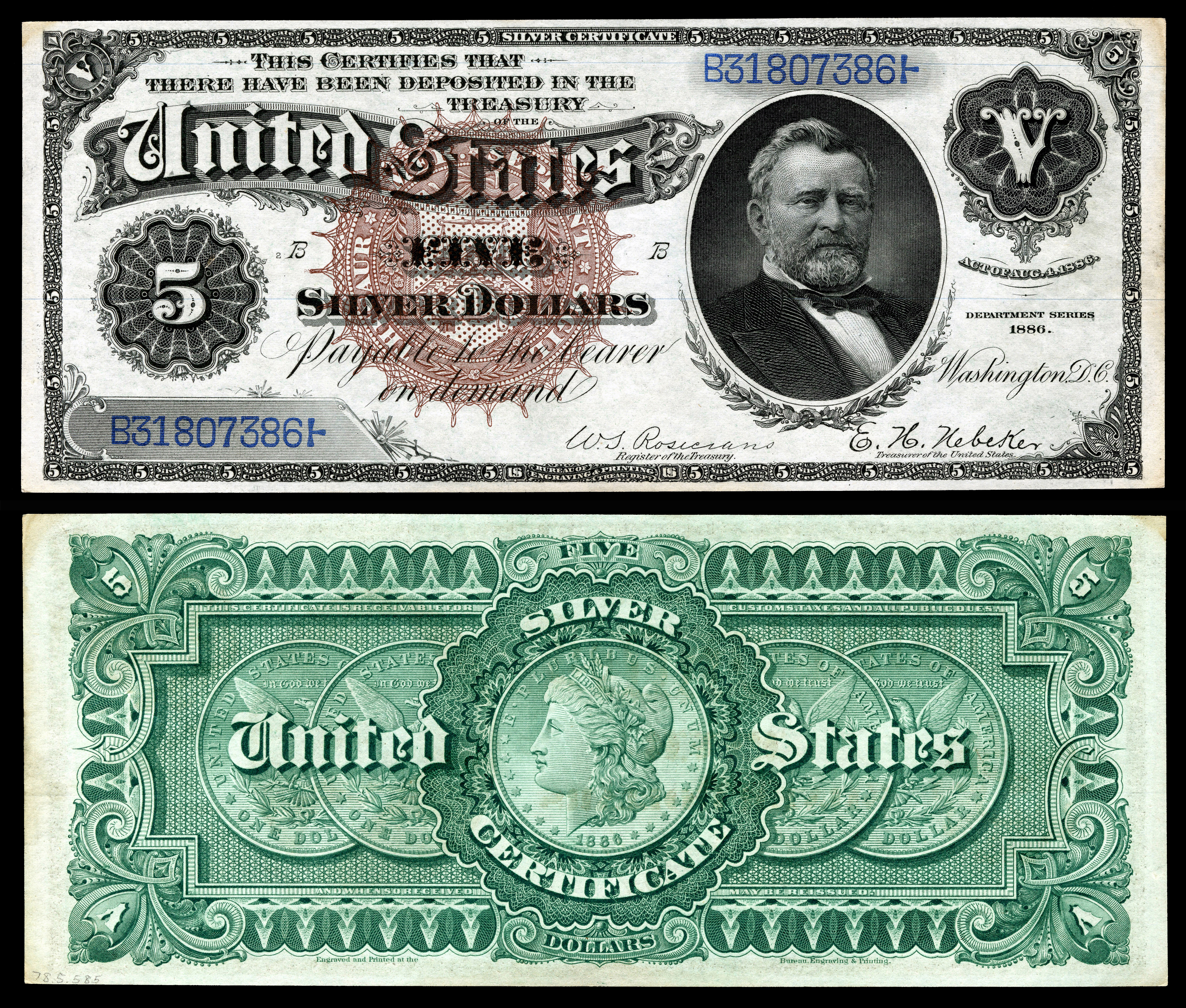
Ulysses S. Grant – Series of 1886 $5 bill

- Silver certificate
  - $1 Series of 1899 (with small left-facing instead of right-facing portrait)
  - $5 1886 DEPARTMENT SERIES
  - $5 Series of 1891
  - $5 Series of 1896 "Educational Series" (portrait on back)
- Gold Certificate
  - $50 Series of 1913
  - $50 Series of 1922
- Federal Reserve Bank Note
  - $50 Series of 1918 issued only by the St. Louis Federal Reserve Bank
  - $50 Series of 1929
- National Bank Note
  - $50 Series of 1929
- Federal Reserve Note
  - $50 Series of 1914
  - All $50 small size Federal Reserve Notes
    - Series of 1928—Series 1995
    - Series 1996–2003 (with redesigned larger portrait)
    - Series 2004A (with redesigned larger portrait)

=== Rutherford B. Hayes ===
Coins for circulation

- 2011 Dollar (obverse), 3rd of four U.S. presidents issued in 2011.

=== James A. Garfield ===
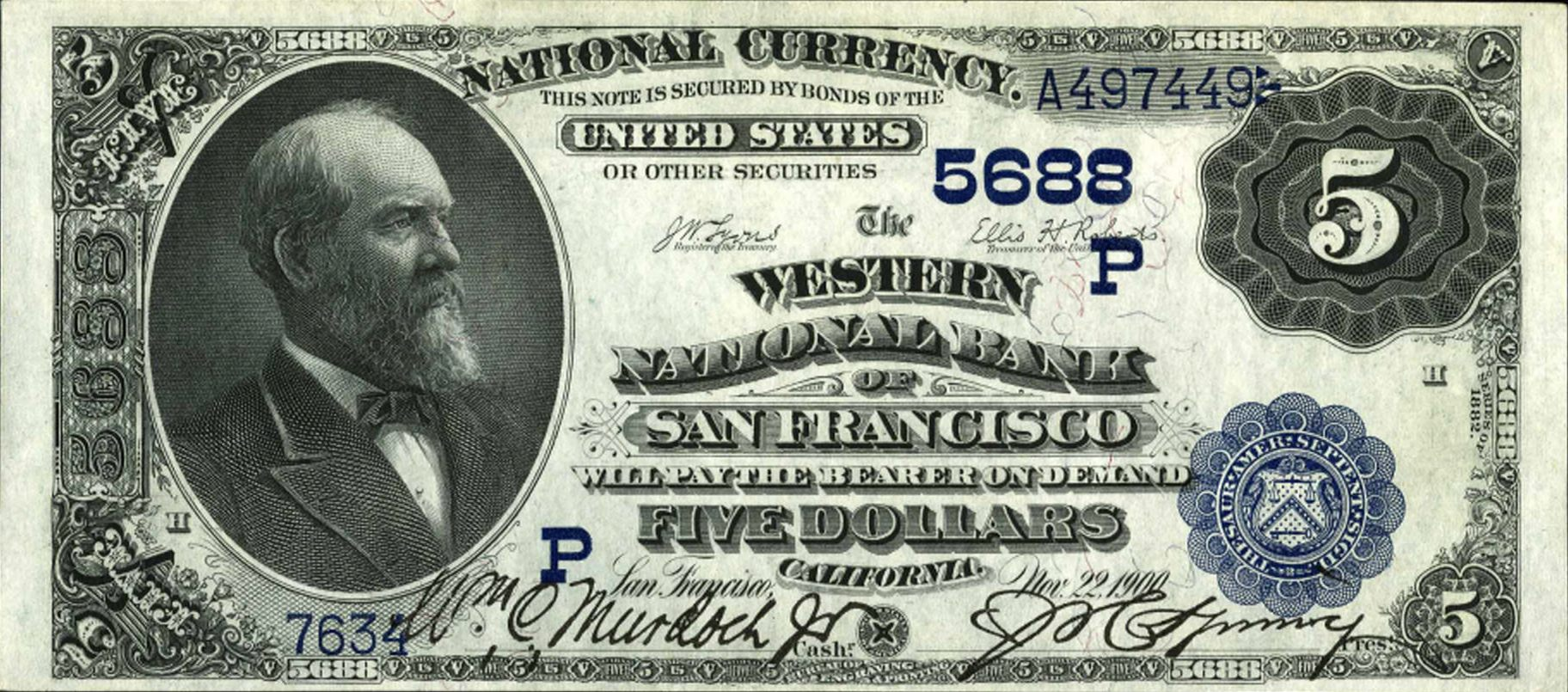
James A. Garfield - $5 National Bank Note

Coins for circulation

- 2011 Dollar (obverse), 4th of four U.S. presidents issued in 2011.

Banknotes

- National Bank Notes
  - All $5 second charter period
- Gold Certificate
  - $20 Series of 1882

=== Chester A. Arthur ===
Coins for circulation

- 2012 Dollar (obverse), 1st of four U.S. presidents issued in 2012.

=== Grover Cleveland ===
Coins for circulation

- 2012 Dollar (obverse), 2nd of four U.S. presidents issued in 2012.
- 2012 Dollar (obverse), 4th of four U.S. presidents issued in 2012.

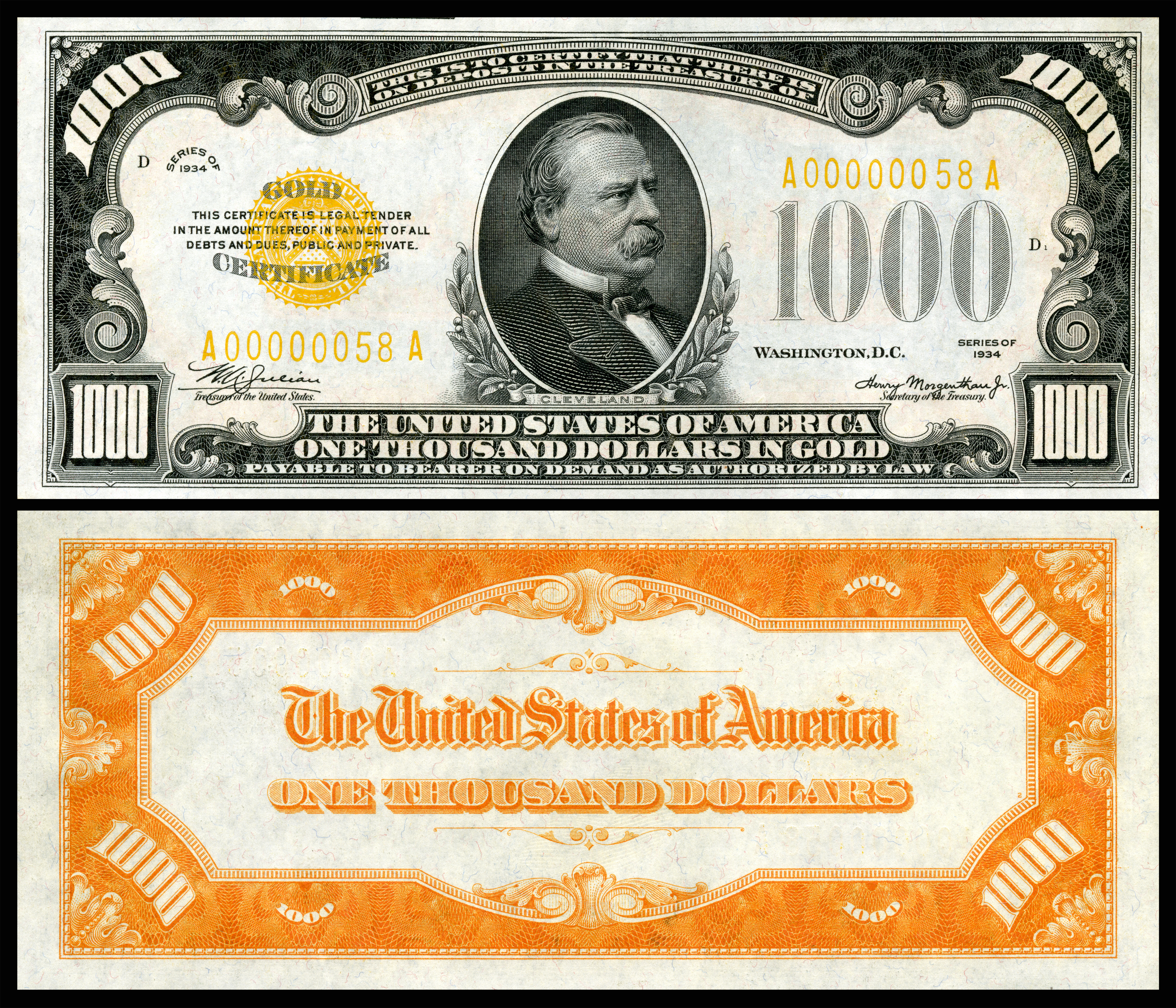
$1000 Gold Certificate (1934) depicting Grover Cleveland

Banknotes

- Federal Reserve Note
  - $20 Series of 1914
  - All $1000 small size Federal Reserve Notes
- Gold Certificate
  - $1000 Series of 1928
  - $1000 Series of 1934

=== Benjamin Harrison ===
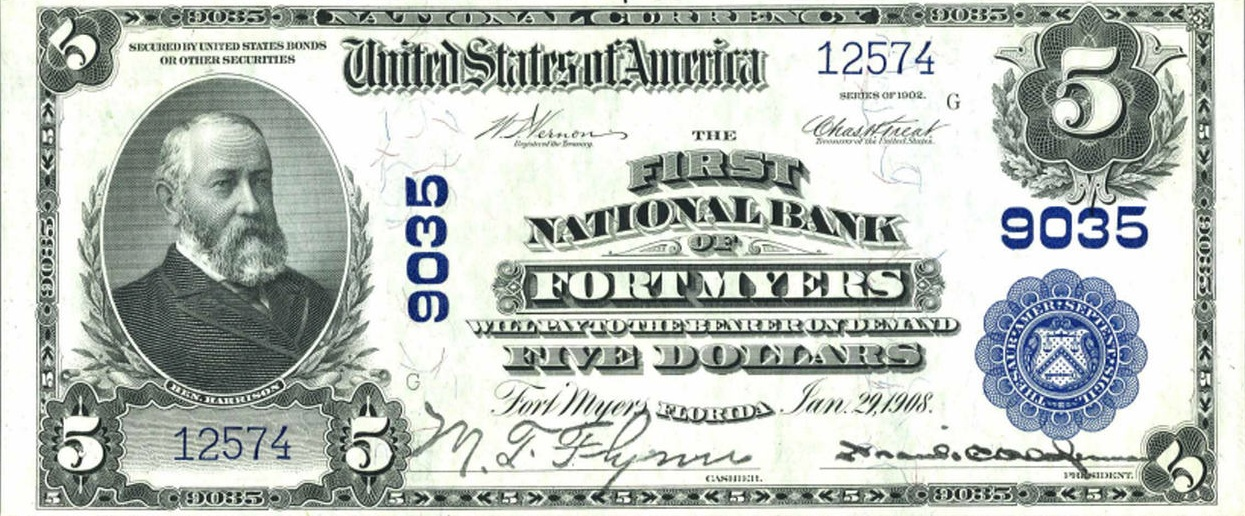
Benjamin Harrison - $5 National Bank Note

Coins for circulation

- 2012 Dollar (obverse), 3rd of four U.S. presidents issued in 2012.

Banknotes

- National Bank Notes
  - All $5 third charter period

=== William McKinley ===
Commemorative coins

- 1903 commemorative gold dollar – issued for the Louisiana Purchase Exposition
- 1916 and 1917 commemorative dollar – commemorate McKinley's death

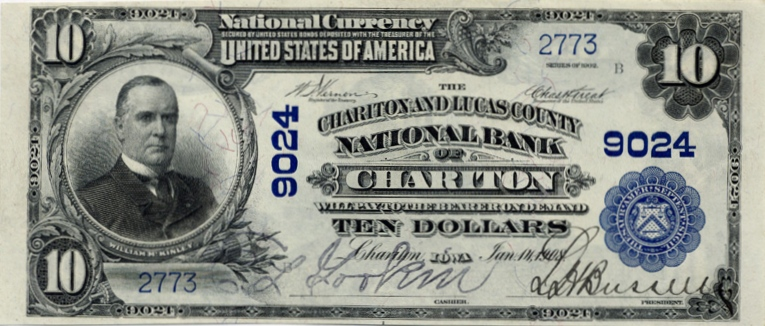
William McKinley - $10 National Bank Note

Banknotes

- National Bank Notes
  - All $10 third charter period
- Gold Certificate
  - $500 Series of 1928
- Federal Reserve Notes
  - All $500 small size

Coins for circulation

- 2013 Dollar (obverse), 1st of four U.S. presidents issued in 2013.

=== Theodore Roosevelt ===
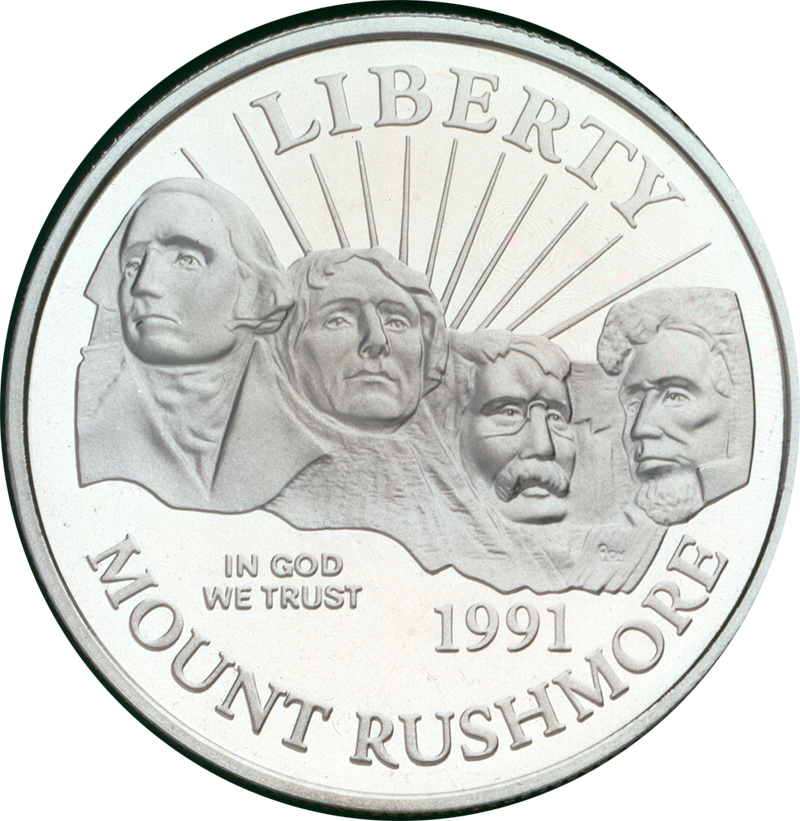
Mount Rushmore commemorative half dollar

Coins for circulation

- 2006 South Dakota state quarter (Mount Rushmore)
- 2013 Dollar (obverse), 2nd of four U.S. presidents issued in 2013.
- 2016 Quarter Dollar (reverse), 4th of five America's National Park Commemorative Quarters to be issued later in the year.

Commemorative coins

- 1991 Mount Rushmore commemorative coin series
  - Half dollar
  - Silver dollar
  - $5 gold piece

=== William Howard Taft ===
Coins for circulation

- 2013 Dollar (obverse), 3rd of four U.S. presidents issued in 2013.

=== Woodrow Wilson ===
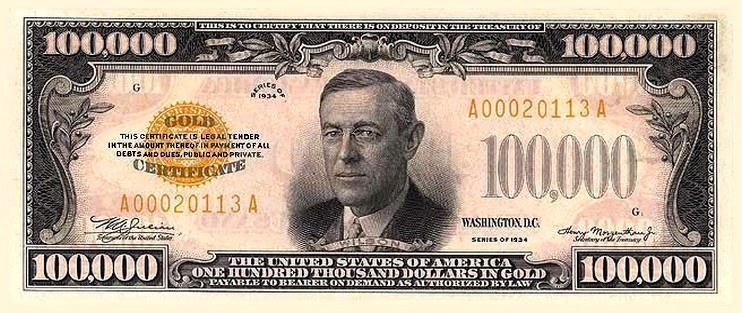
Woodrow Wilson - $100,000 bill

Banknotes

- Gold Certificate
  - $100,000 Series of 1934 Gold certificate

Coins for circulation

- 2013 Dollar (obverse), 4th of four U.S. presidents issued in 2013.

=== Warren G. Harding ===
Coins for circulation

- 2014 Dollar (obverse), 1st of four U.S. presidents issued in 2014.

=== Calvin Coolidge ===
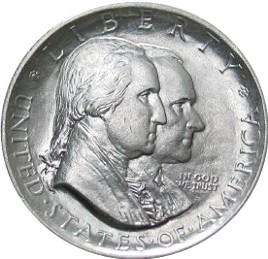
Coolidge with Washington on commemorative half dollar

Commemorative coin

- 1926 commemorative half dollar – 150th anniversary of the signing of the
  Declaration of Independence
- 2014 Dollar (obverse), 2nd of four U.S. presidents issued in 2014.

=== Herbert Hoover ===
Commemorative coin

- 2014 Dollar (obverse), 3rd of four U.S. presidents issued in 2014.

=== Franklin D. Roosevelt ===
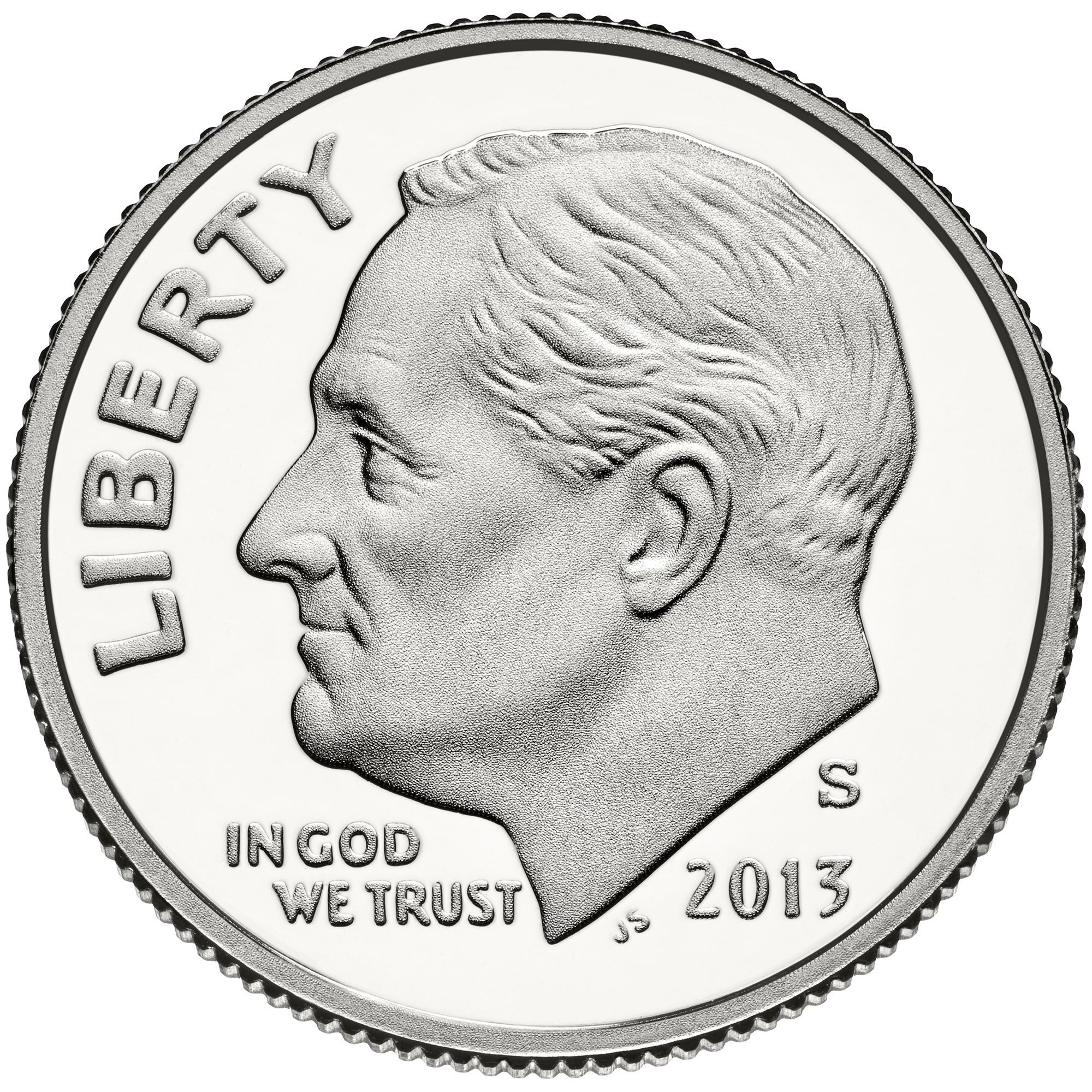
The standard American dime has featured Franklin Roosevelt since 1946.

Coins for circulation

- 1946–1964 (90% silver) dime
- 1965–present (copper-nickel) dime

Commemorative coins

- 1997 $5 gold commemorative coin
- 2014 Dollar (obverse), 4th of four U.S. presidents issued in 2014.

=== Harry S. Truman ===
Coins for circulation

- 2015 Dollar (obverse), 1st of four U.S. presidents issued in 2015.

=== Dwight D. Eisenhower ===
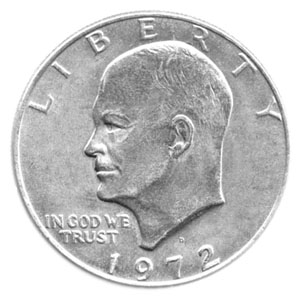
Eisenhower dollar

Coins for circulation

- 1971–1978 Eisenhower Dollar coin. The reverse only changed in 1975 and 1976 when the double dated coins showing 1776–1976 were minted to celebrate the U.S. Bicentennial.
- 2015 Dollar (obverse), 2nd of four U.S. presidents issued in 2015.

Commemorative coins

- 1990 Eisenhower commemorative dollar – 100th anniversary of Eisenhower's birth

=== John F. Kennedy ===
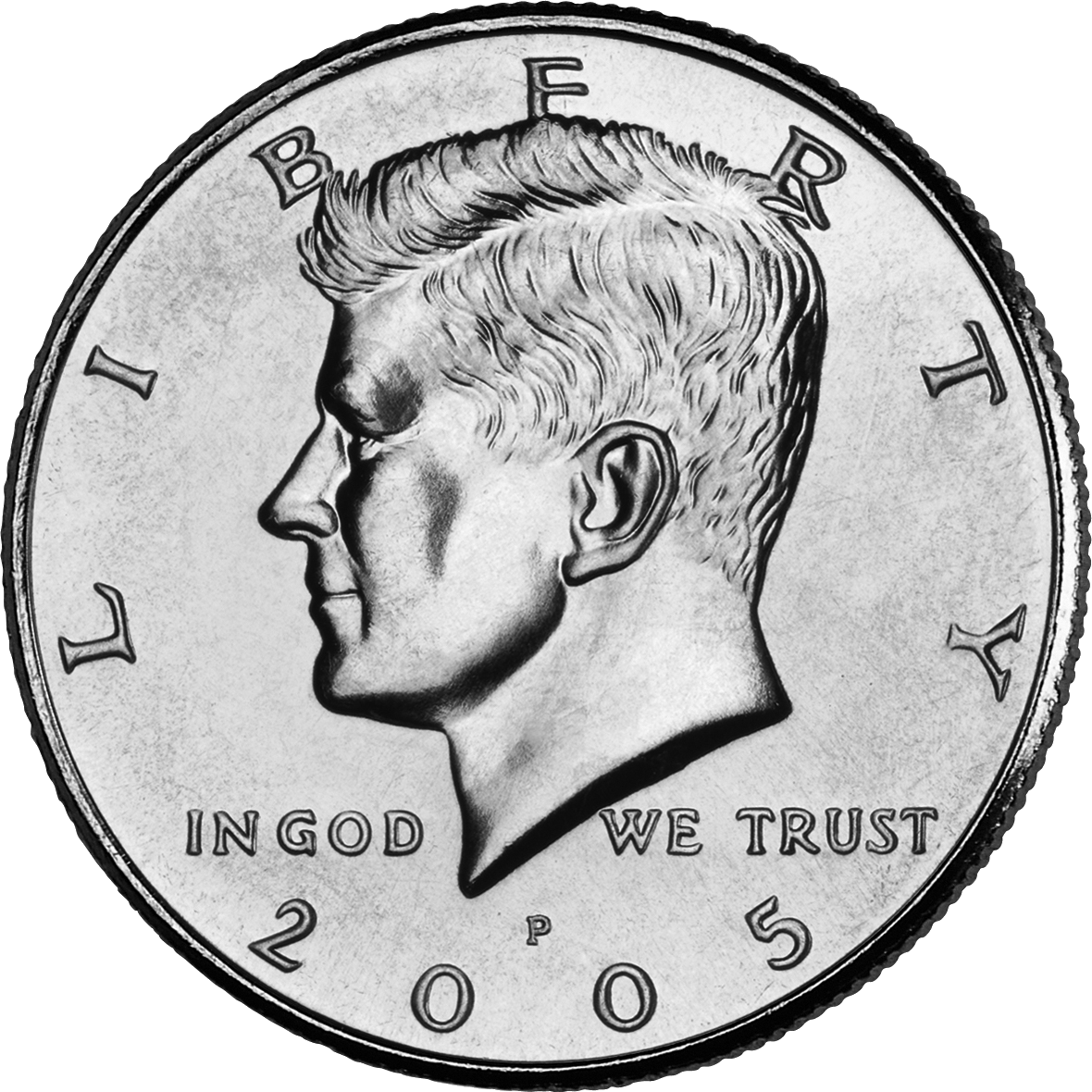
Kennedy half dollar

Coins for circulation

- 1964 (90% silver) half dollar (silver proofs from 1992–present also have this composition)
- 1965–1970 half dollar (40% silver)
- 1971–present half dollar (copper-nickel) The reverse only changed in 1975 and 1976 when the double dated coins showing 1776–1976 were minted to celebrate the U.S. Bicentennial.
- 2015 Dollar (obverse), 3rd of four U.S. presidents, issued in 2015.

=== Lyndon B. Johnson ===
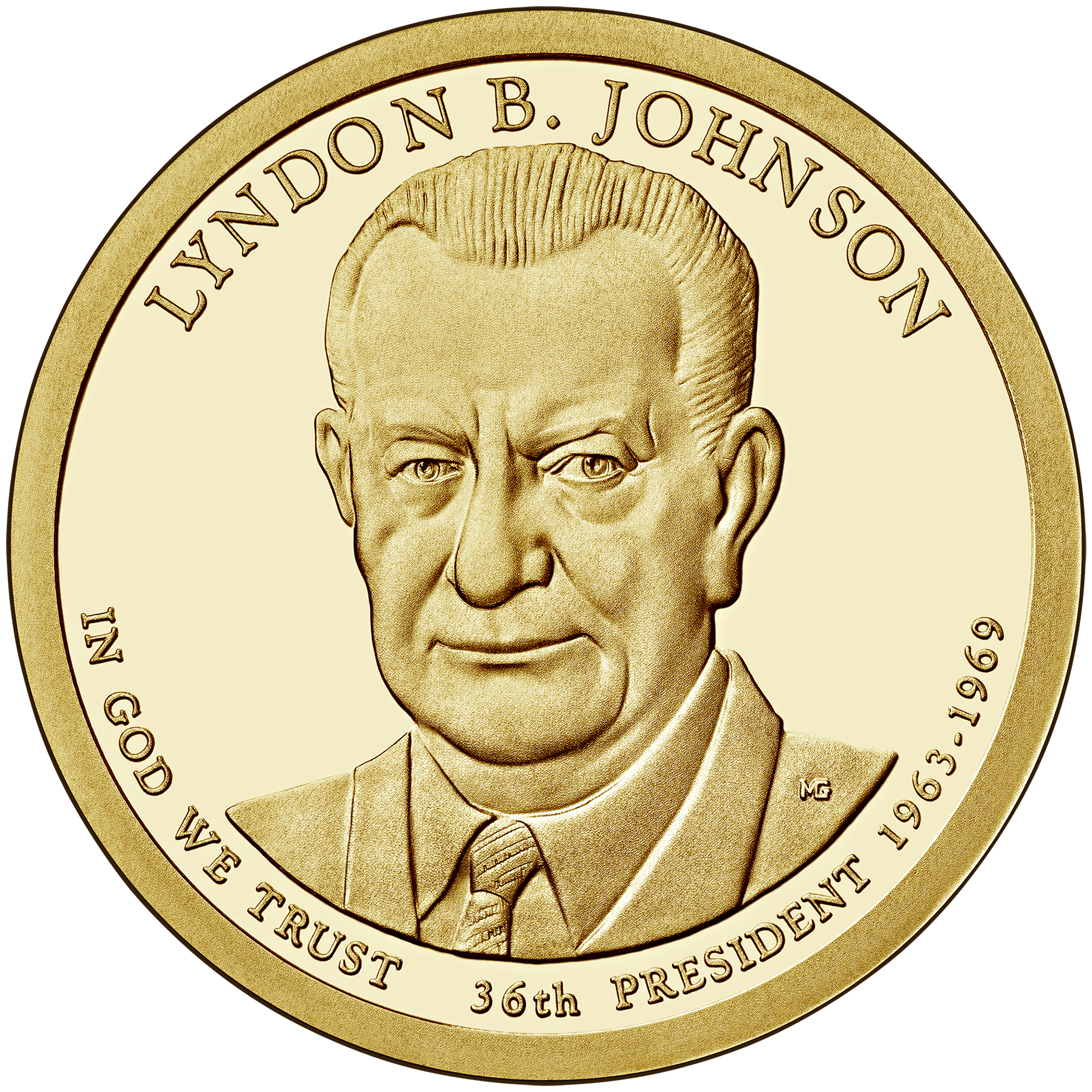
Lyndon Johnson dollar, as first issued in 2015

Coins for circulation

- 2015 Dollar (obverse), 4th of four U.S. presidents issued in 2015.

=== Richard Nixon ===
Coins for circulation

- 2016 Dollar (obverse), 1st of three U.S. presidents issued in 2016.

=== Gerald Ford ===
Coins for circulation

- 2016 Dollar (obverse), 2nd of three U.S. presidents issued in 2016.

=== Ronald Reagan ===
Coins for circulation

- 2016 Dollar (obverse), 3rd of three U.S. presidents issued in 2016.

=== George H. W. Bush ===
Coins for circulation

- 2020 Dollar (obverse)

== Presidential dollar coin series ==
- 2007 – George Washington, John Adams, Thomas Jefferson, James Madison
- 2008 – James Monroe, John Quincy Adams, Andrew Jackson, Martin Van Buren
- 2009 – William Henry Harrison, John Tyler, James K. Polk, Zachary Taylor
- 2010 – Millard Fillmore, Franklin Pierce, James Buchanan, Abraham Lincoln
- 2011 – Andrew Johnson, Ulysses S. Grant, Rutherford B. Hayes, James A. Garfield
- 2012 – Chester A. Arthur, Grover Cleveland, Benjamin Harrison, Grover Cleveland
- 2013 – William McKinley, Theodore Roosevelt, William Howard Taft, Woodrow Wilson
- 2014 – Warren G. Harding, Calvin Coolidge, Herbert Hoover, Franklin D. Roosevelt
- 2015 – Harry S. Truman, Dwight D. Eisenhower, John F. Kennedy, Lyndon B. Johnson
- 2016 – Richard Nixon, Gerald Ford, Ronald Reagan
- 2020 – George H. W. Bush
- Note: The remaining presidents (Bill Clinton, George W. Bush, Barack Obama, Donald Trump, Joe Biden) are not eligible to be honored because they are still alive as of 2026. Jimmy Carter died in 2024.

== Confederate States of America ==
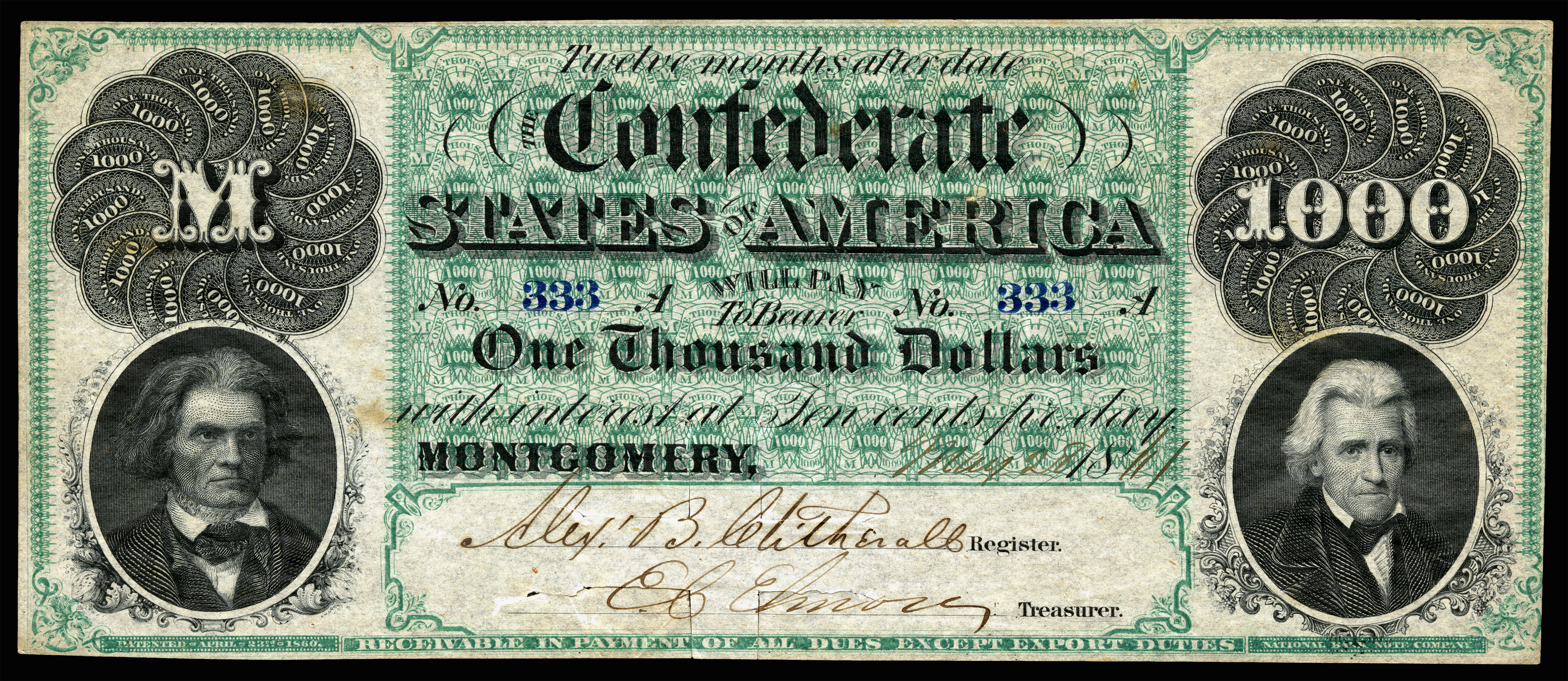
1861 $1,000 CSA banknote depicting Calhoun and Jackson

=== Andrew Jackson ===
- $1000 1861 Montgomery, Alabama note, with Jackson's first vice president, John C. Calhoun at left.

=== George Washington ===
- $50 1861 (Washington at left, and allegories at right and center)
- $50 July 25, 1861, 1862 (Washington at center and allegory at left)
- $100 July 25, 1861, 1862

State issues

- $1 Louisiana, 1864
- $2 Tallahassee, Florida, 1861
- $3 Tallahassee, Florida, 1861
- $5 Treasury Warrant note for military service, Texas, 1862
- $20 Virginia, 1861
- $100 Virginia, 1862
- $1,000 Confederate States of America note is one of 607 issued and features images of John C. Calhoun on the left and Andrew Jackson on the right. Almost all of the Montgomery issued notes were signed by hand by Alex B. Clitherall, Register, and E.C. Elmore, Treasurer,1861

== Philippine Islands, Commonwealth of the Philippines, Republic of the Philippines ==
=== William McKinley ===
- 5 Peso Series of 1903 and 1910 Silver Certificate
- 5 Peso Series of 1916, and 1921 Philippine National Bank Circulating Note
- 5 Peso Series of 1937 Philippine National Bank Circulating Note (with Commonwealth Seal in red)
- 5 Peso Series of 1918 and 1924 Treasury Certificate (large portrait)
- 5 Peso Series of 1937 Philippine National Bank Circulating Note (with Commonwealth Seal in red)
- 5 Peso Series of 1929, 1936, 1941, and "Victory" Series No. 66 Treasury Certificate (with small portrait at left coincide with Admiral George Dewey, starting 1936 it had the seal of the Commonwealth in red and in the "Victory" Series No. 66 in blue)

=== Ronald Reagan ===
- 25 Piso 1982, silver coin, (portrait with President Marcos), KM#235
- 25 Piso 1986, silver coin, commemorating President Aquino's visit to Washington, KM#246
- 2500 Piso 1986, gold coin, commemorating President Aquino's visit to Washington, KM#247

=== Franklin D. Roosevelt ===
- 1 Peso 1936, silver coin, Establishment of Commonwealth (portrait with President Quezon), KM#177

=== George Washington ===
- 10 Peso Series of 1903 and 1912 Silver Certificate
- 10 Peso Series of 1916 and 1921 Philippine National Bank Circulating Note
- 5 Peso Series of 1937 Philippine National Bank Circulating Note (with Commonwealth Seal in red)
- 10 Peso Series of 1918 and 1924 Treasury Certificate (with small portrait similar to modern U.S. $1 bill)
- 10 Peso Series of 1929, 1936, 1941, and "Victory" Series No. 66 Treasury Certificate (with right-facing portrait similar to 1999 $5 commemorative gold coin, starting 1936 it had the seal of Commonwealth in red and in the "Victory" Series No. 66 in blue)

== U.S. presidential appearances on other coins and currency around the world ==
=== The Bahamas ===
In 1991, a 12-coin silver five-dollar series was issued in the Bahamas commemorating the 500th anniversary of European discovery of the Americas. Three of those coins showed images of U.S. presidents, with the coat of arms of the Bahamas on the obverse side.

Thomas Jefferson

- $5, 1991, silver, with Independence Hall – Declaration of Independence KM#143

Abraham Lincoln

- $5 1991, silver, with Abolition of Slavery KM#145

Theodore Roosevelt

- $5 1991, silver, with Panama Canal KM#149

=== Cook Islands ===
Abraham Lincoln

- $50, 1990, silver, with United States Capitol dome KM#48

Thomas Jefferson

- $50, 1993, gold, KM#175

George Washington

- $50 1993, gold, KM#173

=== Cuba ===
Abraham Lincoln

- 1 Peso, 1993 1 peso, copper, commemorative, shows U.S.A (lower 48) and broken chains in background, Cuban shield on obverse. km#509

=== Isle of Man ===
Dwight D. Eisenhower

- 1 Crown, 1994

George Washington

- 1 Crown, 1976 copper-nickel (KM#37) and a silver (KM#37a) commemorative, Bicentenary of American Independence, with Queen Elizabeth II on the obverse.
- In 1989, a four coin 1 crown set was issued in both copper-nickel and silver featuring the Bicentenary of George Washington's Presidential Inauguration.
  - 1 Crown, with James Monroe holding the flag – Washington Crossing the Delaware 1776
    - copper-nickel KM#246, silver KM#246a
  - 1 Crown, (large portrait)
    - copper-nickel KM#247, silver KM#247a
  - 1 Crown, (small portrait surrounded by a wreath containing eight stars and an eagle)
    - copper-nickel KM#248, silver KM#248a
  - 1 Crown, taking the oath of office
    - copper-nickel KM#249, silver KM#249a

Eleven presidents on one coin

- 1987, 4 coin proof set, commemorating the Bicentenary of America's Constitution features the Statue of Liberty surrounded by these U.S. presidents in clockwise order; Thomas Jefferson, James Madison, George Washington, James Monroe, Abraham Lincoln, Ulysses S. Grant, Theodore Roosevelt, Franklin D. Roosevelt, Dwight Eisenhower, John F. Kennedy and Ronald Reagan
  - 1/2 Crown, gold, KM187
  - 1 Crown, copper-nickel, KM#176
  - 5 Crown, silver, 65.1 mm (3 in), KM#177
  - 10 Crowns, silver, 75 mm (3 in), KM#188

=== Liberia ===
These are all commemoratives issued in Liberia featuring images of U.S. presidents with a Liberian arms symbol on the obverse side;

George H. W. Bush

- 1989 inaugural series
  - $10 silver KM#57
  - $250 gold KM#58

George W. Bush

- $5 2001, inaugural, shows profile with Dick Cheney

Bill Clinton

- 1993 inaugural series
  - $5 silver KM#67
  - $10 silver KM#68
  - $50 silver KM#69
  - $100 silver KM#70
  - $250 gold KM#71

Dwight D. Eisenhower

- $10 1994, silver (25th anniversary of his death) KM#157

William H. Harrison

- $5 2000

John F. Kennedy

- 1988 series 25th anniversary of death
  - $10 silver KM#54
  - $250 gold KM#52
- 1993 series 30th anniversary of death
  - $5 silver, KM#103
  - $10 silver, KM#104
  - $250 gold, KM#105
- $10 1999, silver In Memory of John F. Kennedy Jr., conjoined busts similar to U.S. half dollar KM#424

Richard Nixon

- 1996 series with Chairman Mao Zedong
  - $1 copper-nickel, KM#255
  - $5 silver, KM#261
  - $10 silver, KM#262

Ronald Reagan

- 1998 series with Abraham Lincoln statue
  - $1 copper-nickel, KM#386
  - $10 silver, KM#387
  - $100 gold, KM#388

Franklin D. Roosevelt

- 1995 portrait series
  - $1 copper-nickel, KM#141
  - $10 silver, KM#146
  - $100 gold, KM#151
- 1995 series, Cairo Conference, includes Winston Churchill and Chiang Kai-shek
  - $1 copper-nickel, KM#164
  - $10 silver, KM#165
  - $100 gold, KM#166

Harry S. Truman

- 1995 series
  - $1 copper-nickel, KM#143
  - $10 silver, KM#148
  - $100 gold, KM#153

=== Marshall Islands ===
Dwight D. Eisenhower

- 1990 series, saluting in uniform
  - $5 copper-nickel, KM#38
  - $50 silver, KM#39

John F. Kennedy

- $50 1995, silver, taking oath of office, KM#275

=== Niue ===
Dwight D. Eisenhower

- 1990 series, in uniform
  - $5 copper-nickel, KM#29
  - $50 silver, KM#30
  - $200 gold, KM#45

John F. Kennedy

- 1988 series, "Ich bin ein Berliner" quote
  - $5 copper-nickel, KM#17
  - $50 silver, KM#18
  - $100 silver, KM#19
  - $250 gold, KM#20
- $25 1994 (KM#79), 1997 (4 types, KM#82, 96, 97, 98), gold, taking oath of office
- $50 1993, gold, Apollo, KM#65
- $50 1993, gold, KM#66

Franklin D. Roosevelt

- 1990 series "A date which will live in infamy" quote
  - $5 copper-nickel, KM#35
  - $50 silver, KM#36
  - $200 gold, KM#52

=== Paraguay ===
John F. Kennedy

- 1500 Guaranies, 1974, gold, KM#126
- 3000 Guaranies, 1974, gold, KM#138
- 4500 Guaranies, 1974, gold, KM#146

Abraham Lincoln

- 3000 Guaranies, 1974, gold, KM#131

=== Turks and Caicos Islands ===
Dwight D. Eisenhower

- 5 Crowns, 1994, copper-nickel, 50th Anniversary – Normandy Landing, KM#176

Franklin D. Roosevelt

- 20 Crowns, 1995, silver, with Churchill and Stalin, KM#137

George Washington

- 1976 series, facing King George III – U.S. Bicentennial
  - 20 Crowns, silver, KM#13
  - 50 Crowns, gold, KM#15

=== United Arab Emirates ===
Al-Fujairah Richard Nixon

- 2 Riyals, 1969 (AH1388), 1970 (AH1389), silver, KM#2
- 25 Riyals, 1969 (AH1388), 1970 (AH1389), gold, KM#7

Ras al-Khaimah Dwight D. Eisenhower

- 10 Riyals, 1970, silver, memorial, KM#31

Sharjah John F. Kennedy

- 5 Rupees, 1965, silver, memorial, KM#1

=== Western Samoa ===
Franklin D. Roosevelt 1981 series, sitting in wheelchair

- 1 Tala, copper-nickel, KM#47
- 10 Tala, silver, KM#48
- 100 Tala, gold, KM#49

== See also ==
- Confederate States of America dollar
- List of people on banknotes
- List of people on stamps of the United States
- List of people on United States banknotes
- Presidential memorials in the United States
- United States dollar
- United States paper money
  - Federal Reserve Bank Note
  - Federal Reserve Note
  - Gold Certificate
  - National Bank Note
  - Silver certificate (United States)
  - United States Note
