= Marika Somogyi =

American sculptor (born 1933)

- Born: 1933 (age 92–93); Budapest, Kingdom of Hungary
- Education: Hungarian University of Fine Arts; University of California, Davis
- Known for: Sculpting

Marika Somogyi (born 1933) is a Hungarian-born American sculptor.

== Biography ==
Somogyi was born in 1933, in Budapest, Kingdom of Hungary, into a rich Jewish family. She attended a private elementary school until World War II, when she hid in a Catholic convent to avoid capture by the Nazis. Her family was reunited at the end of the war, but her father was arrested soon after. She married at age 17, to a man named László. During the Hungarian Revolution of 1956, she and her husband fled Hungary and moved to the United States.

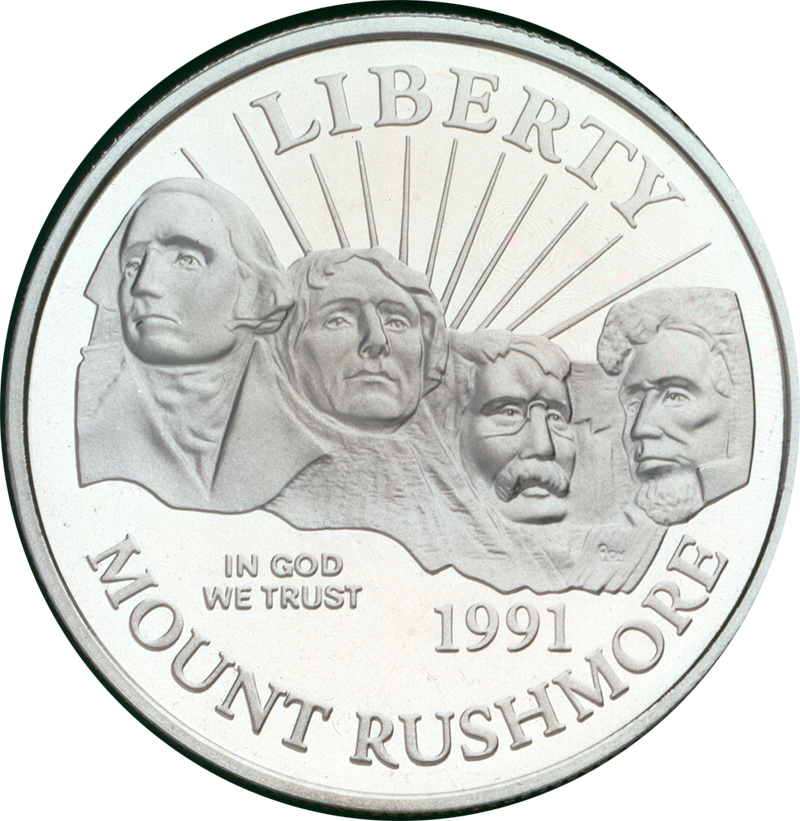
Obverse of the 1991 Mount Rushmore Anniversary coin, designed by Somogyi

Somogyi studied at the Hungarian University of Fine Arts before moving to the United States. There, she studied at the University of California, Davis, under Robert Arneson and attended classes alongside Arnaldo Pomodoro. She later was a lecturer at Pennsylvania State University.

Somogyi was commissioned to design the 1991 and 2001 commemorative silver dollars. The coins are permanently displayed at the British Museum, the Smithsonian Institution, the Staatliche Museen zu Berlin, and the Stockholm Palace, among other places.

== Awards and honors ==
- Excellence in American Medallic Art, American Numismatic Association (1989)
- Joel Meisner Award (1998)
- C.A. Brown Award (1998)
