= Mount Rushmore Anniversary coins =

Commemorative coins

The Mount Rushmore Anniversary commemorative coins are a series of commemorative coins which were issued by the United States Mint in 1991. The coins honored the 50th anniversary of the completion of Gutzon Borglum's colossal sculpture, the Shrine of Democracy, at the Mount Rushmore National Memorial. The statue and the coins feature George Washington, Thomas Jefferson, Theodore Roosevelt, and Abraham Lincoln.

== Legislation ==
The Mount Rushmore Commemorative Coin Act (Pub. L. 101–332) authorized the production of three coins, a clad half dollar, a silver dollar, and a gold half eagle, to commemorate the 50th anniversary of the dedication of Mount Rushmore. The act allowed the coins to be struck in both proof and uncirculated finishes. The coins were first released on February 15, 1991.

== Designs ==
=== Half dollar ===
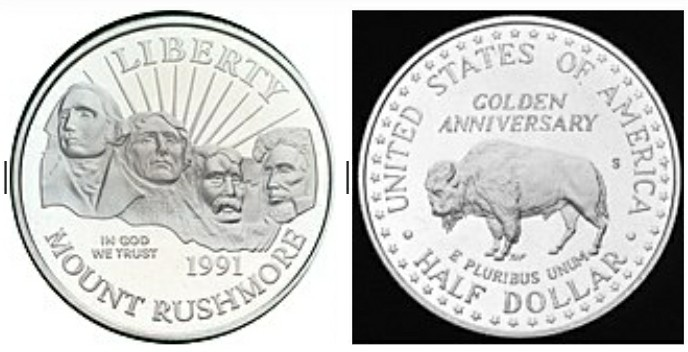
Mount Rushmore Anniversary half dollar obverse (left) and reverse (right)

The obverse of the Mount Rushmore Anniversary half dollar, designed by Marcel Jovine, features Mount Rushmore and a sunburst. The reverse, designed by T. James Ferrell, shows a classic image of an American buffalo.

=== Dollar ===
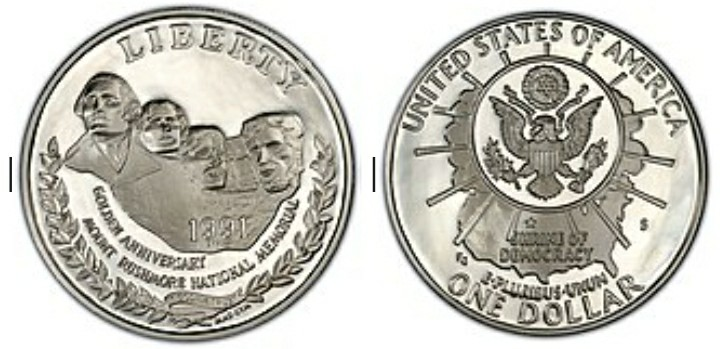
Mount Rushmore Anniversary dollar obverse (left) and reverse (right)

The obverse of the Mount Rushmore Anniversary dollar, designed by Marika Somogyi, features the mountainside of Mount Rushmore wreathed in laurel. The reverse, designed by Frank Gasparro, features the Great Seal over a map of the United States, with a star marking the location of Mount Rushmore. It includes the words Shrine of Democracy, the original name of the sculpture.

=== Half eagle ===
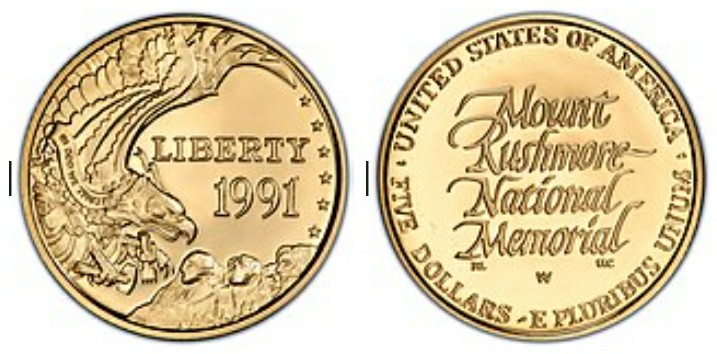
Mount Rushmore Anniversary half eagle obverse (left) and reverse (right)

The obverse of the Mount Rushmore Anniversary half eagle, designed by John Mercanti, features the American Eagle in flight over Mount Rushmore and six stars on the right edge. The reverse, designed by Robert Lamb, features a stylized inscription, "Mount Rushmore National Memorial".

== Specifications ==
Half Dollar

- Display Box Color: Gray
- Edge: Reeded
- Weight: 11.34 grams
- Diameter: 30.61 millimeters; 1.205 inches
- Composition: 92% Copper, 8% Nickel (Cupronickel)

Dollar

- Display Box Color: Gray
- Edge: Reeded
- Weight: 26.730 grams; 0.76 troy ounce
- Diameter: 38.10 millimeters; 1.50 inches
- Composition: 90% Silver, 10% Copper

Half Eagle

- Display Box Color: Gray
- Edge: Reeded
- Weight: 8.359 grams; 0.24 troy ounce
- Diameter: 21.59 millimeters; 0.850 inch
- Composition: 90% Gold, 6% Silver, 4% Copper

== See also ==
- United States commemorative coins
- List of United States commemorative coins and medals (1990s)
