= List of memorials and monuments at Arlington National Cemetery =

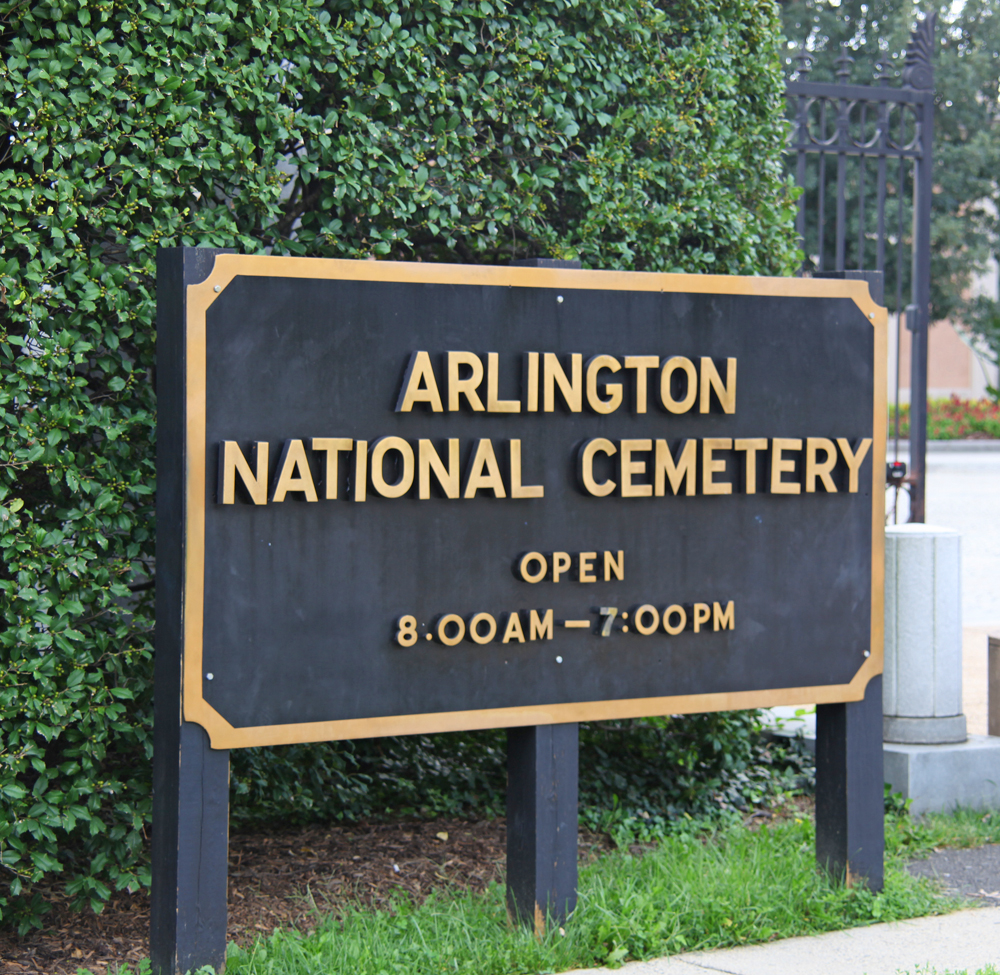
Entry sign at Arlington National Cemetery in Arlington County, Virginia

Memorials and monuments at Arlington National Cemetery include 28 major and 142 minor monuments and memorials. Arlington National Cemetery is a United States national cemetery located in Arlington County, Virginia, in the United States. It is managed by the United States Army, rather than the United States Department of Veterans Affairs.

The first major memorial in the cemetery was completed in 1866. Entry gates in the cemetery were later dedicated to Union Army generals. The Spanish–American War and World War I led to the construction of several more major memorials. The Tomb of the Unknown Soldier was constructed in 1921, although the large sarcophagus above the burial vault was not dedicated until 1932. Almost a third of the cemetery's major memorials have been constructed since 1983.

It takes an act of Congress to place a stone or bronze memorial monument that is not a headstone at Arlington National Cemetery. Donations of memorial trees are accepted, but new, living memorials with memorial markers in memory of organizations has been suspended.

== Memorials and monuments ==
=== Arlington National Cemetery ===
There are over 300,000 headstones and hundreds of memorials at Arlington National Cemetery. Arlington House itself is a memorial to George Washington. The son of Martha Dandridge Custis Washington, John Parke Custis purchased the 1,100-acre (450 ha) tract of wooded land on the Potomac River north of Alexandria, Virginia in 1778. When John Parke Custis died after the Battle of Yorktown, the final battle of the American Revolution, Arlington Estate was inherited by his son, then-six-month-old George Washington Parke Custis. John Parke Custis, his sister Martha (Patsy) Parke Custis, his son George (named after George Washington, the step-father of John). and his daughter Eleanor (Nelly) Parke Custis (later Lewis) grew up at Mount Vernon, the home of Martha and George Washington. George Washington Parke Custis built Arlington House as a memorial to George Washington. An Army veteran of the War of 1812, George W. P. Custis and his wife Mary Fitzhugh Custis were buried in a fenced-in area now located in section 13.

George W. P. Custis and his wife Mary Fitzhugh Custis who raised their daughter Mary Anna Randolph Custis at Arlington, left the estate to her. Custis stipulated that whomever owned his beloved Arlington must be named Custis. Therefore, Arlington would go to his daughter and then to his grandson, Custis Lee. Mary Anna Custis married her distant cousin, United States Army Lieutenant Robert E. Lee in June 1831. With the outbreak of the U.S. Civil War on April 12, 1861, Robert E. Lee resigned from the United States Army and took command of Virginia's confederate forces on April 23, 1861. Mary Custis Lee left Arlington on May 15, 1861 to join her daughters at Ravensworth, a nearby home owned by Custis relatives. When Mary Custis Lee did not pay her property taxes in person, the estate was legally confiscated. The United States would later return it, and then purchase the property from Custis Lee. Union troops occupied Arlington on May 24.

On July 16, 1862, the United States Congress passed legislation authorizing the purchase of land for national cemeteries for military dead. In May 1864, large numbers of Union forces died in the Battle of the Wilderness, requiring a large new cemetery to be built near the District of Columbia. A study quickly determined that Arlington Estate was the most suitable property for this purpose. While Private William Henry Christmas became the first Union soldier buried at Arlington on May 13, 1864, formal authorization for burials did not occur until June 15, 1864.

=== First memorials and monuments ===
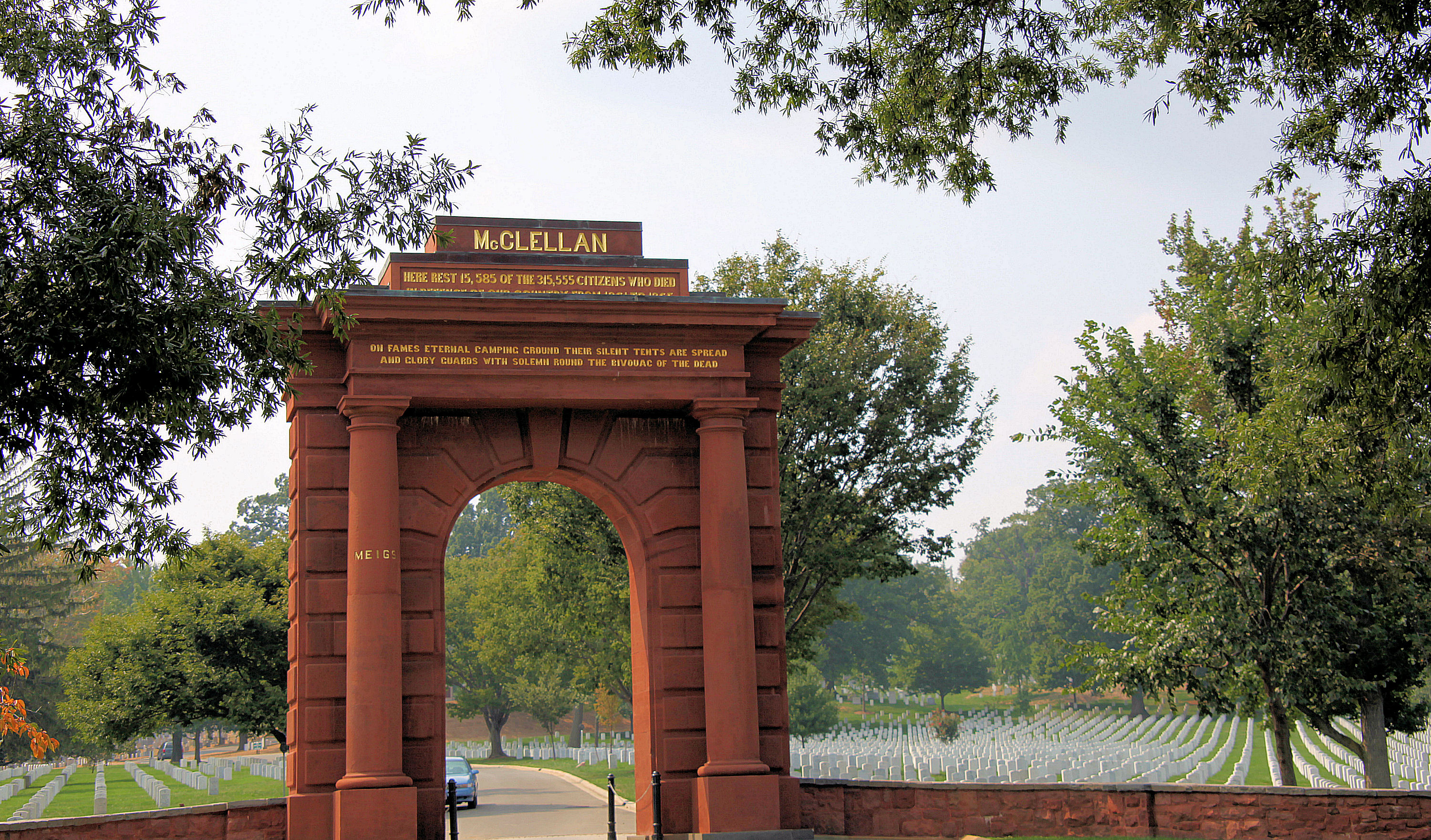
McClellan Gate, erected in 1879, the second memorial erected at Arlington National Cemetery

The first memorials at Arlington National Cemetery were built during and immediately after the Civil War. These first memorials were small, as the federal government (burdened by the cost of the war) expended little money on the cemetery.

The first memorial constructed was the Civil War Unknowns Monument. United States Army Quartermaster General Montgomery C. Meigs ordered the construction of the monument in 1865. The bodies of 2,111 Union and Confederate dead were collected and placed in a vault beneath the monument, which was sealed in September 1866.

In 1867, Congress enacted legislation requiring that all military cemeteries be fenced. Meigs ordered the construction of a red Seneca sandstone wall around the cemetery. The construction of the wall (which would not be complete until 1897) necessitated the construction of gates as well. Construction began on a memorial to Major General George B. McClellan (the McClellan Gate) in 1870, but delays in obtaining high-quality red Seneca sandstone delayed its completion until 1879.

The Spanish–American War in 1898 led to the creation of several new memorials: The Spanish–American War Memorial in 1902, the Spanish–American War Nurses Memorial in 1905, and the Rough Riders Memorial in 1907. Two more major memorials were added prior to World War I: The Confederate Monument in 1914, and the USS Maine Memorial in 1915.

Another nine memorials, most of them commemorating World War I, were added in the 1920s and 1930s. This included the Tomb of the Unknown Soldier, which was dedicated on November 11, 1921. The cenotaph above the tomb is a later addition, and was dedicated on November 11, 1932. At the end of World War II, the cemetery had a total of 16 major memorials. Another 12 major memorials were added after 1949, with eight of these constructed after 1983.

=== Former memorials and monuments ===
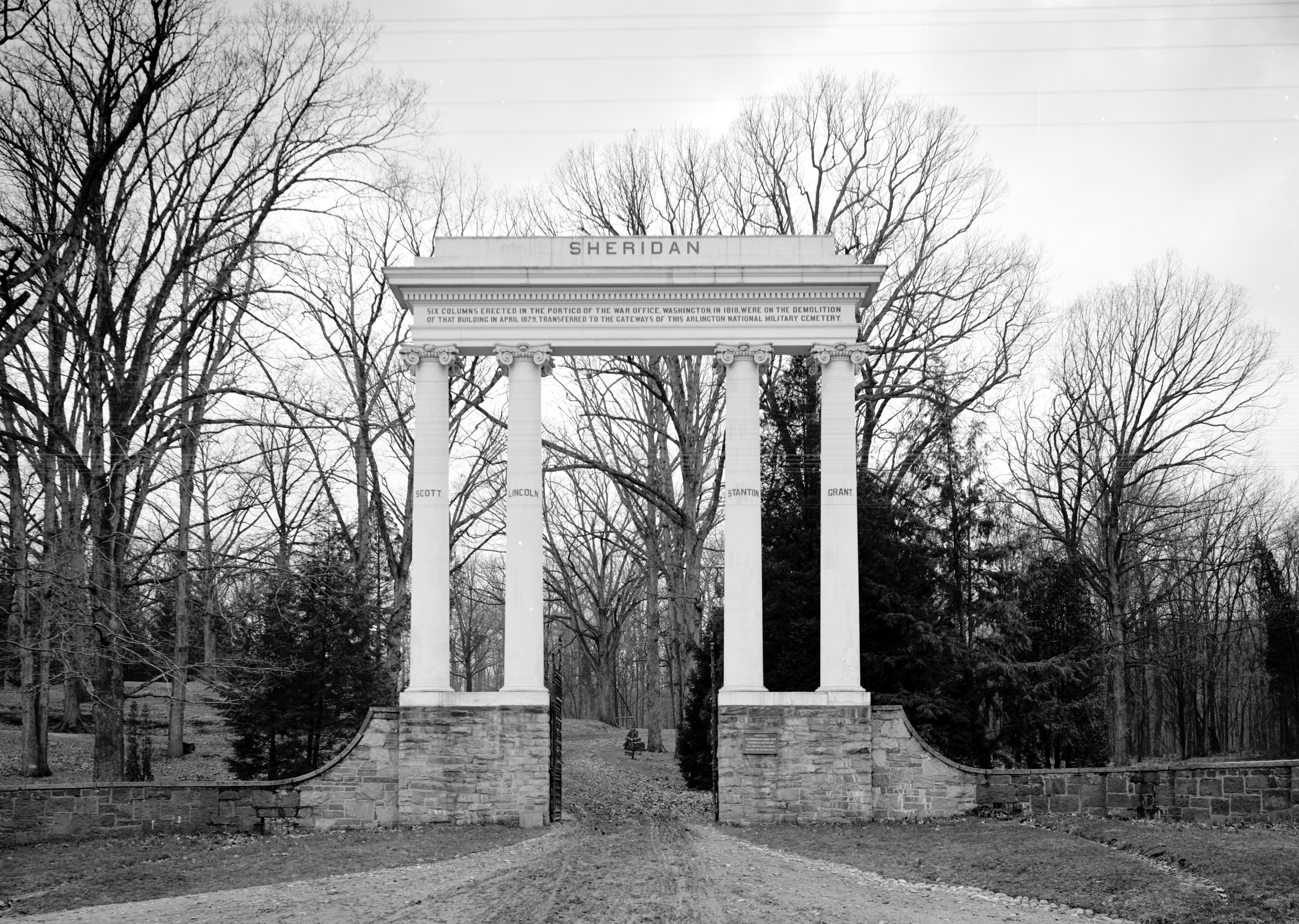
Sheridan Gate in 1900

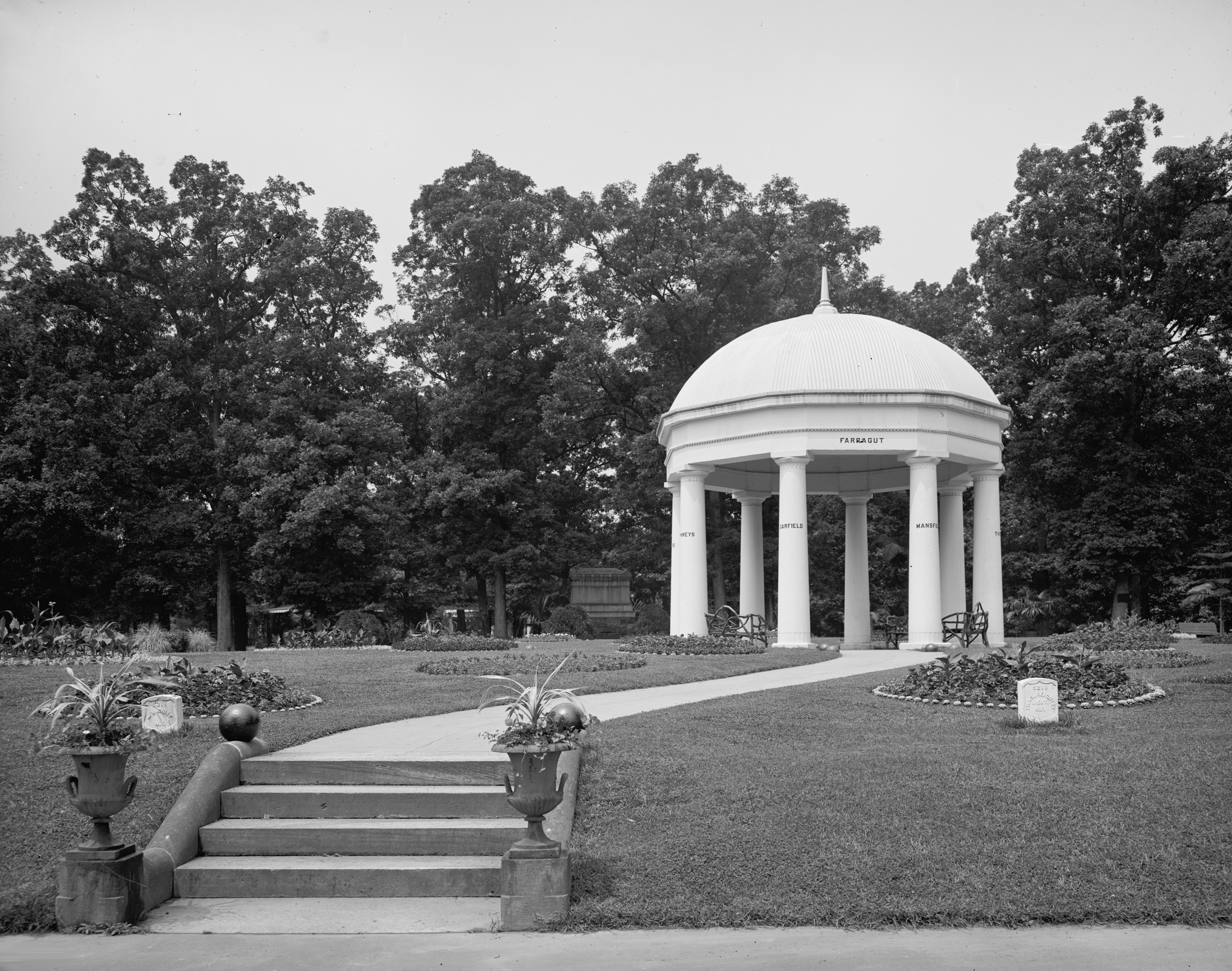
The Temple of Fame in 1903; the Civil War Unknowns Monument can be seen in the background under the trees.

Several memorials and monuments in Arlington National Cemetery no longer exist. One of the earliest memorials to be built in the cemetery was the Sheridan Gate, named for General Philip Sheridan. The gate was constructed in 1879 of four Ionic columns salvaged from the demolition of the War Department Building (located at the site of the current Eisenhower Executive Office Building). Initially, there was no name inscribed on the gate's pediment, although the last names of Abraham Lincoln, Ulysses S. Grant, Edwin M. Stanton, and Winfield Scott were chiseled into the front of each column. After the death of Sheridan, his last name was added to the pediment and the gate became known as the Sheridan Gate. Another early memorial was the Ord-Weitzel Gate, named for Major General Edward Ord and Major General Godfrey Weitzel. Also completed in 1879, it was constructed from two salvaged War Department Building columns. Like the Sheridan Gate, this gate was initially not dedicated to anyone. But by 1902, with the passing of both Ord and Weitzel, their names were inscribed into left and right columns of the gate, respectively.

Since 1864, Arlington National Cemetery's easternmost boundary was Arlington Ridge Road at present-day Eisenhower Drive. In 1971, however, the cemetery expanded eastward to its present boundary atJ efferson Davis Highway. At that time, the Sheridan and Ord-Weitzel gates were dismantled and the columns, marble pediments, and iron gates put into outdoor storage. Unfortunately, both gates were severely damaged during their dismantling. They were further damaged by inappropriate outdoor storage, and have been heavily vandalized.

In 1884, a Temple of Fame was erected in the center of the flower garden on the south side of Arlington House. The U.S. Patent Office building had suffered a fire in 1877, and it was torn down and rebuilt in 1879.

In 1884, stone columns, pediments, and entablatures from this demolition were used to construct the Temple of Fame. The Temple was a round, Greek Revival, temple-like structure with Doric columns supporting a central dome. Inscribed on the pediment supporting the dome were the last names of great Americans such as George Washington, Ulysses S. Grant, Abraham Lincoln, and David Farragut.

A year after it was built, the last names of several Union Civil War generals (such as George Meade, James B. McPherson, and James A. Garfield) were carved into the columns. Since there wasn't enough marble to rebuild the dome, a tin dome (molded and painted to look like marble) was installed instead. The Temple of Fame was demolished in 1967.

A Confederate States Army monument is scheduled to be removed by December 22, 2023 because it reportedly represents "sanitized depictions of slavery" and promotes the Lost Cause of the Confederacy myth.

=== New memorials and monuments ===
In 1960, the United States Congress enacted "The Act of 2 September 1960" (74 Stat; 24 U.S.C. 295a). As codified in Title 32 of the Code of Federal Regulations, Part 553, a concurrent or joint resolution of Congress is needed before any new memorial or monument may be placed at Arlington. This requirement does not apply to group burials, for which an aboveground marker may be erected without congressional approval.

The rules were relaxed somewhat in 2012. On August 6, 2012, Congress enacted the "Honoring America's Veterans and Caring for Camp Lejeune Families Act of 2012" (P.L. 112–154; 126 Stat. 1165). Title VI, Section 604 of this legislation permits the Secretary of the Army to establish regulations for the erection at Arlington National Cemetery of memorials or monuments to an individual or military event if 25 years have passed. Such monuments may be placed only in areas designated by the Secretary of the Army, and must be paid for entirely by private donations. All alternative locations to Arlington National Cemetery must be ruled out, and the United States Commission of Fine Arts must be consulted on the memorial's appropriateness. The 25-year requirement may be waived if the event or service is ongoing, or if a "manifest injustice" would occur. In such cases, Congress may override the waiver by joint resolution within 60 days.

In 2012, legislation began moving through Congress to approve a "Place of Remembrance" at Arlington National Cemetery. The memorial will be an ossuary designed to contain fragments of remains which are unidentifiable through DNA analysis. The legislation required that these remains be cremated before placement in the memorial. Cemetery officials said that Arlington National Cemetery has no means of receiving and burying these remains, and placing them in the Tomb of the Unknowns would be inappropriate. The legislation leaves the design and placement of the memorial up to cemetery officials. On September 18, 2012, the House of Representatives approved the memorial, sending the legislation to the Senate. This legislation was not acted on by the Senate, and died at the end of the 112th United States Congress.

In May 2014, Arlington National Cemetery officials renamed the Old Amphitheater, rededicating it as the James R. Tanner Memorial Amphitheater. Tanner, a Union Army veteran, lost both legs during the American Civil War. He became a stenographer and clerk with the War Department, and took down most of the eyewitness testimony during the early hours of the investigation into the assassination of Abraham Lincoln. Tanner is buried a few yards from the amphitheater.

== List of major memorials and monuments ==
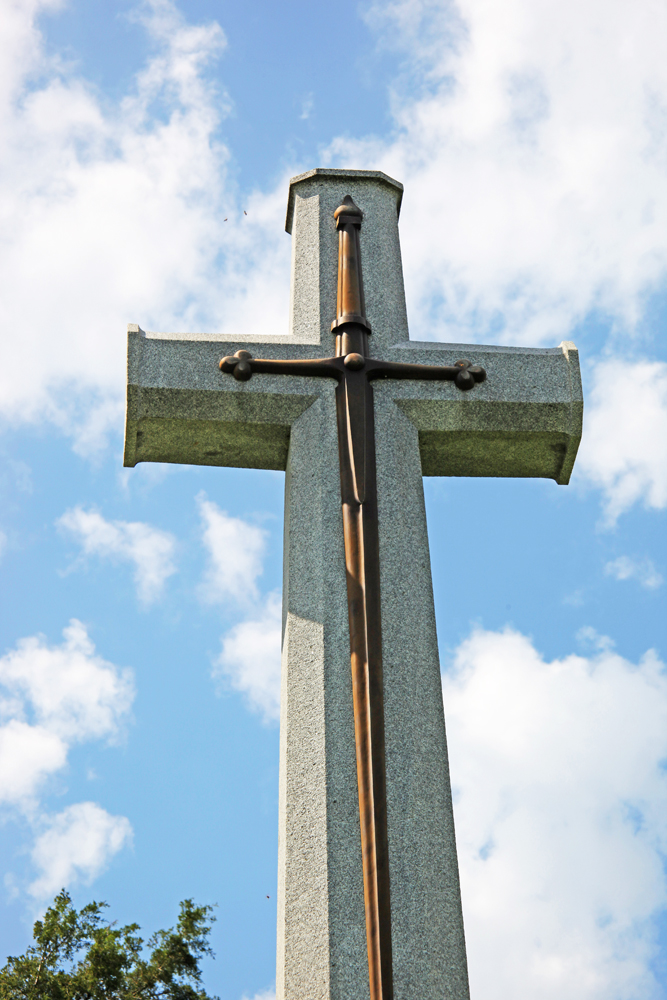
The Canadian Cross of Sacrifice in 2011

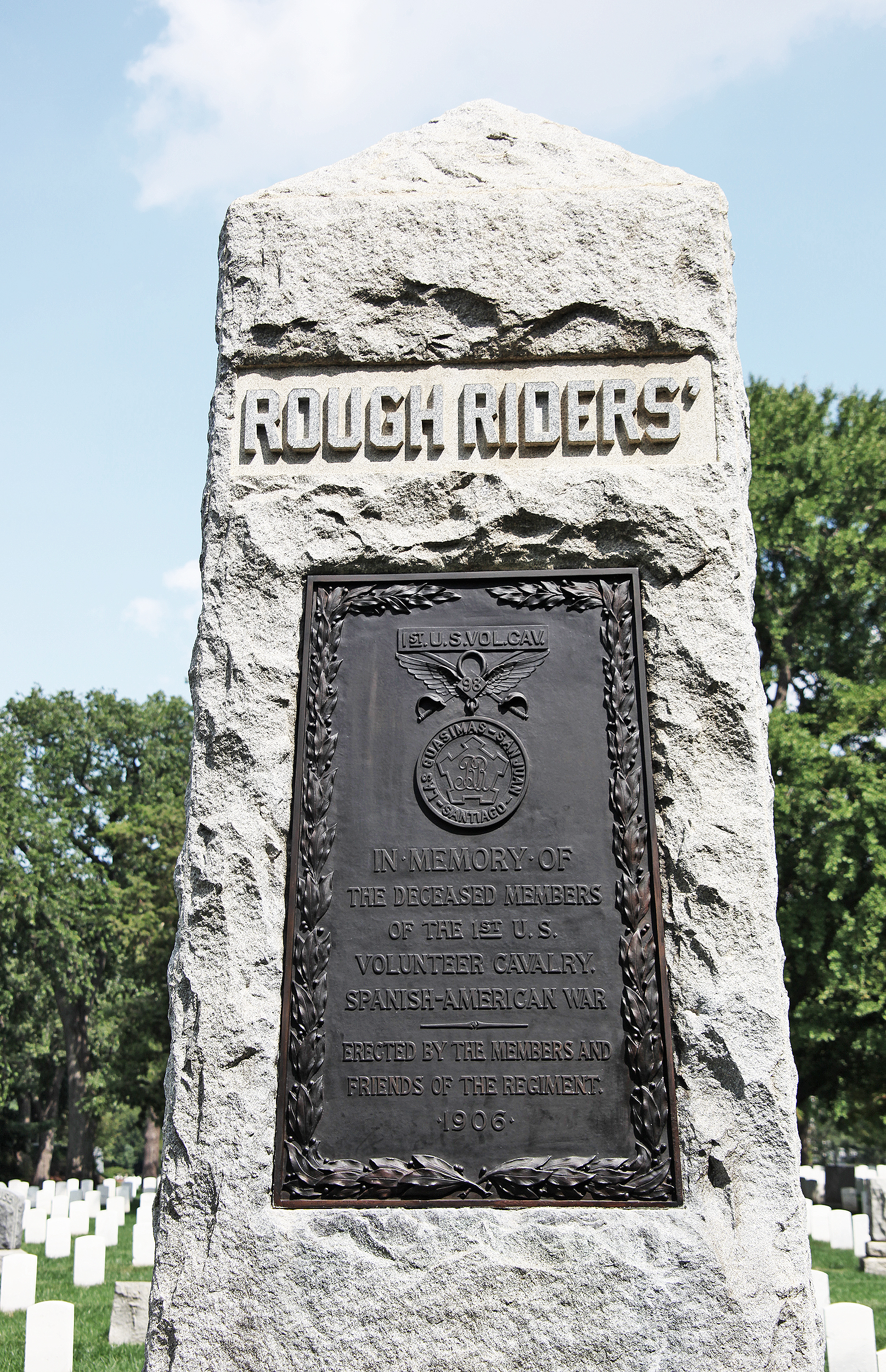
The Rough Riders Monument in 2011

Below is a list of the major memorials and monuments in the cemetery.

Site	Date created	Section	Coordinates	Notes
3rd Infantry Division Memorial	1990	46	38.876774°N 77.073814°W	
Argonne Cross	1923	18	38.871556°N 77.075582°W	
Arlington Memorial Amphitheater	1920	35/48	38.876413°N 77.072746°W	
Battle of the Bulge Memorial	2006	21	38.874954°N 77.075566°W	
Canadian Cross of Sacrifice	1927	46	38.876977°N 77.074106°W	
Chaplains' Monument	1926	2	38.879055°N 77.069846°W	
Civil War Unknowns Monument	1866	26	38.880416°N 77.073183°W	
Confederate Memorial	1914	16	38.876121°N 77.077278°W	
Iran Rescue Mission Memorial	1983	46	38.876761°N 77.074011°W	
James Tanner Amphitheater	1874 / 2014	26	38.880262°N 77.073885°W	(Note: Built in 1874, the structure was not designated a memorial until May 30, 2014.)
John F. Kennedy Eternal Flame	1963	45	38.88153°N 77.07150°W	
Korean War Contemplative Bench	1987	48	38.877083°N 77.073192°W	
McClellan Gate	1879	33	38.87879°N 77.067109°W	
Nurses Memorial	1938	21	38.874874°N 77.074841°W	
Pan Am Flight 103 Memorial	1995	1	38.880875°N 77.074924°W	
Robert F. Kennedy Gravesite	1968	45	38.88118°N 77.07150°W	
Rough Riders Memorial	1907	22	38.87543°N 77.075994°W	
Space Shuttle Challenger Memorial	1987	46	38.87675°N 77.074045°W	
Space Shuttle Columbia Memorial	2004	46	38.876772°N 77.073979°W	
Spanish–American War Memorial	1902	22	38.875374°N 77.074544°W	
Spanish–American War Nurses Memorial	1905	21	38.874951°N 77.075426°W	
Tomb of the Unknowns	1921	48	38.87638°N 77.07217°W	
United States Coast Guard Memorial	1928	4	38.870885°N 77.068261°W	
Unknown Dead of 1812 Memorial	1976	1	38.880724°N 77.075119°W	
USS Maine Mast Memorial	1915	24	38.876503°N 77.074714°W	
USS Serpens Memorial	1949	34	38.874035°N 77.068668°W	
Victims of Terrorist Attack on the Pentagon Memorial	2005	64	38.873461°N 77.060939°W	
William Howard Taft Monument	1932	30	38.883667°N 77.069313°W	
Woodhull Memorial Flagpole	1924	35	38.875552°N 77.073075°W	

== List of minor memorials and monuments ==
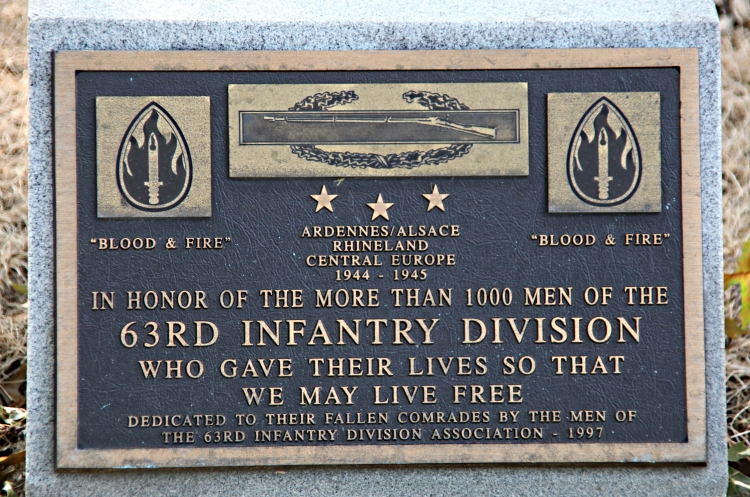
The 63rd Infantry Division memorial plaque in Section 12

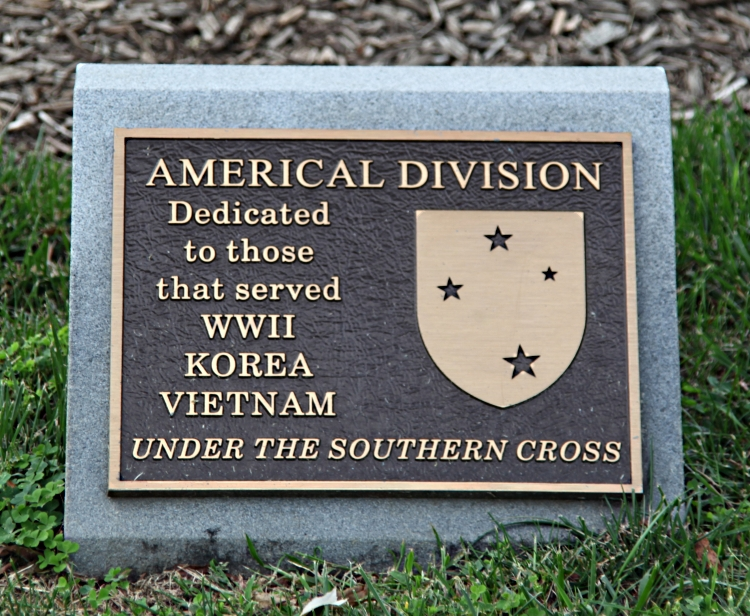
The Americal Division memorial plaque in Section 34

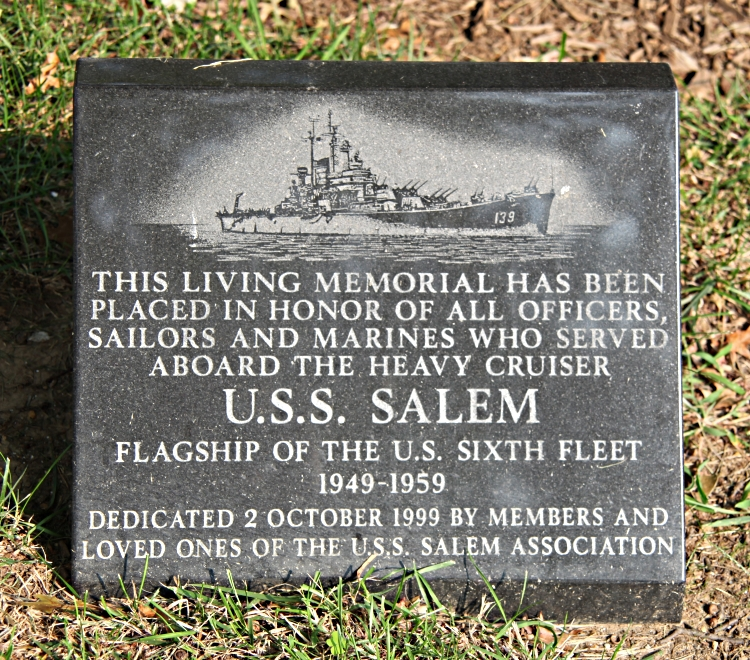
USS Salem memorial plaque in Section 12

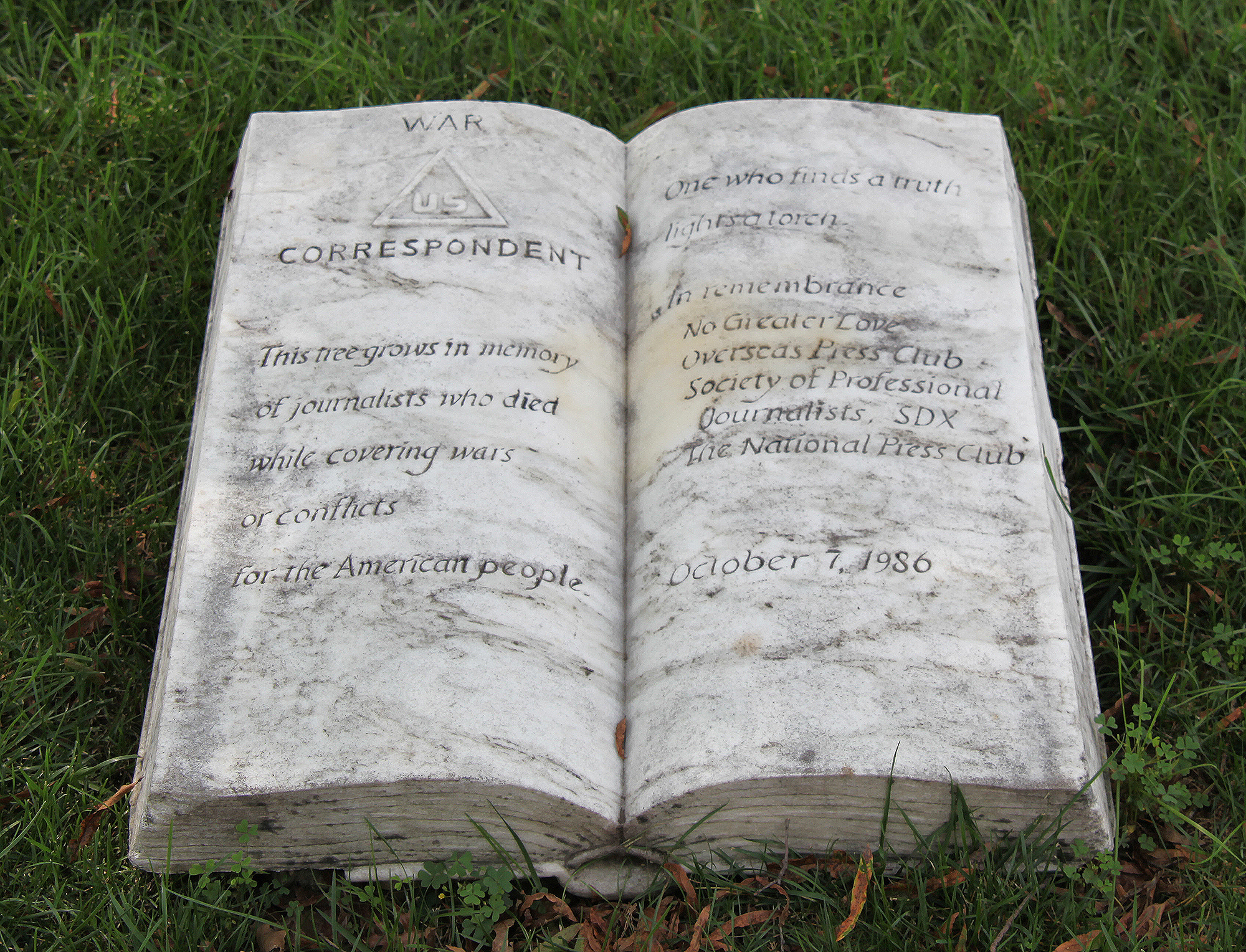
The War Correspondents memorial in Section 46 is unusual for being of marble and designed like a book.

The U.S. Army has statutory authority to manage Arlington National Cemetery under the National Cemetery Act, as amended. Under regulations issued in Title 32, Section 553.22 of the Code of Federal Regulations, the Army established a mechanism for proposing and building minor memorials at Arlington National Cemetery without requiring an act of Congress. Appendix A to Section 553 ("Specifications for Tributes in Arlington National Cemetery") lays out the specific form these minor memorials may take. In summary, most minor memorials must be a small plaque no more than 36 square inches (230 cm^{2}) in area, and no more than 2 inches (5.1 cm) thick. Wording must be dignified, and the Superintendent of Arlington National Cemetery has sole and unlimited authority to accept or reject the plaque's design and wording.

A short time prior to 2014, Arlington National Cemetery discontinued the practice of allowing memorial trees, accompanied by plaques, to be placed in the cemetery.

Below is a list of the minor memorials and monuments in the cemetery.

Memorial	Section	Tree
100th Infantry Division Association	034	Maple, Red
104th Timberwolf Division, World War II	032	Cherry, Yoshino
11th Airborne Division	009	Maple, Red
125th Air Transport Group	003	Maple, Red
13th Airborne Division	033	Zelkova, Japanese
144th Army Postal Unit	032	Cherry, Kwanzan Japanese Flowering
16th Infantry Regiment Association	003	Crape Myrtle, Common
173rd Airborne Brigade (Sky Soldiers)	033	Maple, Red
174th Field Artillery Battalion	034	Maple, Red
17th Airborne Division	033	Zelkova, Japanese
199th Light Infantry Brigade	031	Oak, Shumard
1st Armored "Old Ironsides" Division	046	Pine, Eastern White
1st Cavalry Division	033	Maple, Red
1st Marine Division Association	025	Cedar, Blue Atlas
23rd Infantry Regiment	031	Dogwood, Kousa
2nd US Infantry Division	037	Holly, American
319th Bomb Group Association	034	Maple, Red
325th Glider Regiment	007	Maple, Sugar
385th Bomb Group, 8th Air Force, World War II	046	Cherry, Kwanzan Japanese Flowering
3rd United States Infantry (The Old Guard)	035	Dogwood, Kousa
416th Bombardment Group (L)	048	Cherry, Kwanzan Japanese Flowering
423rd Army Field Artillery Battalion	003	Maple, Sugar
446th Bomb Group	034	Maple, Sugar
454th Bombardment Group	022	Oak, Pin
455th Bombardment Group	002	Oak, Pin
461st Bomb Group Association	034	Goldenrain Tree
484th Bombardment Group	033	Gingko
487th Bombardment Group	009	Holly, American
4th Infantry (Ivy) Division	021	Dogwood, Kousa
503rd Parachute Regimental Combat Team	033	Magnolia, Southern
505th Parachute Regimental Combat Team	033	Zelkova, Japanese
508th Parachute Infantry Regiment	035	Spruce, Colorado Blue
511th Parachute Infantry Regiment	048	Cherry, Yoshino
551st Parachute Infantry Battalion	033	Oak, Northern Red
56th Field Artillery Battalion, 8th Infantry Division	033	Maple, Red
5th Regimental Combat Team	005	Tuliptree
63rd Infantry Division	007	Oak, Pin
65th Infantry Division	021	Maple, Sugar
82nd Airborne Division	048	Pine, Austrian
82nd Airborne – Golden Brigade	007	Maple, Red
83rd Infantry Division Association	037	Dogwood, Flowering
8th Air Force Association	034	Maple, Red
93rd Bombardment Group	002	Holly, American
94th Infantry Division	046	Sweetgum, American
96th Infantry Division Association	034	Maple, Red
9th and 10th U.S. Cavalry Association (Buffalo Soldiers)	022	Dogwood, Kousa
African American Korean War Veterans	021	Oak, Sawtooth
Air Force Arlington Ladies (Vandenberg)	030	Oak, Swamp White
Airborne (50th Anniversary Foundation)	002	Maple, Red
America the Beautiful Grove	031	Zelkova, Japanese
Americal Division	034	Maple, Red
American Ex-Prisoners of War	033	Dogwood, Kousa
American War Mothers	035	Cedar, Blue Atlas
American-Armenian Volunteers at Argonne	018	Magnolia, Southern
Amphibious Scouts and Raiders of World War II	031	Maple, Red
Army Arlington Ladies	013	Holly, American
Bataan and Corregidor, American Defenders of	048	Dogwood, Kousa
Battle of the Bulge, Veterans of	046	Cherry, Japanese Flowering
Battlefield Commissions, National Order of	037	Maple, Red
Beirut Victims of Terrorism	059	Cedar of Lebanon
Berlin Airlift Veterans	006	Maple, Sugar
Buffalo Soldiers (92nd Infantry)	023	Maple, Red
Catholic War Veterans	012	Oak, Pin
China-Burma-India Veterans	002	Oak, Pin
Civil Air Patrol	033	Maple, Red
Danish Fight for Freedom Grove	024	Oak, English
Daughters of American Colonists	001	Oak, White
Daughters of Founders and Patriots of America	035	Cherry, Kwanzan Japanese Flowering
Daughters of the American Revolution (National)	031	Maple, Red
Daughters of the American Revolution (Arlington Chapter)	030	Maple, Sugar
El Salvador	012	Oak, White
Elbe River, American-Soviet Link-Up	07A	Birch, Heritage River
Ex-POWs of the Korean War	002	Maple, Red
Flying Tigers	002	Oak, White
Frogmen, U.D.T. (Underwater Demolition Team)	031	Maple, Red
Gilbert Azaleas	035	Azalea
Glider Pilots, World War II	033	Maple, Red
Gold Star Mothers	002	Cedar, Blue Atlas
Indigenous People (Native Americans)	008	Cottonwood, Eastern
Jumping Mustangs, 1st Battalion, 8th Cavalry	048	Cherry, Kwanzan Japanese Flowering
Khe Sanh Veterans	002	Ginkgo
Korean War Dead	048	Mountainash, Korean
Korean War Vets	048	Pine, Korean
Landing Craft Support Ships (LCS(L) 1–130)	046	Oak, Willow
Laotian Counterparts	002	Cedar, Atlas
Lexington Minute Men	001	Hemlock, Eastern
Marshall Plan Anniversary	007	Oak, Swamp White
Medal of Honor Grove (American Forests)	048	Elm, Chinese
Merrill's Marauders (5307th Composite)	013	Elm, Hybrid
Military Chaplains	002	Ginkgo
Military Order of the World Wars	012	Zelkova, Japanese
Military Police	055	Magnolia, Southern
Miller, Glenn (Army Air Force Orchestra)	013	Holly, American
Montford Point Marines	023	Pine, Eastern White
Mother of the Unknown Soldier (the Mother's Tree)	035	Birch, Heritage River
Nagata Japanese Cherry Trees	054	Cherry, Japanese Flowering
National Arborist Association	054	Oak, White
Naval Order of the United States	001	Holly, Japanese
Navy Arlington Ladies	034	Beech, Weeping European
Navy Bombing Squadron VB 104	012	Oak, Shumard
Operation Restore Hope	060	Sweetgum, American
Operation Tiger	013	Pine, Eastern White
Pacific Island Americans	026	Serviceberry, Downy
Paderewski (Polish Legion of American Veterans)	024	Linden, Little-leaf
Peace Maker, The – December 1999	003	Cedar, Blue Atlas
Pearl Harbor	035	Linden, Littleleaf
Persian Gulf War	060	Oak, Willow
POW-MIA	035	Serviceberry, Autumn Brilliance
Purple Heart, Military Order of the	035	Cherry, Kwanzan Japanese Flowering
Quartermaster Corps Association	034	Maple, Japanese
Rakkasans (187th Airborne)	07A	Oak, Willow
Ranger Advisors	013	Magnolia, Southern
Retired Officers Association, The	048	Oak, Pin
Reuben H. Tucker Chapter, 82nd Airborne	031	Oak, Northern Red
Russian Orthodox Church	013	Magnolia, Southern
Schweinfurt	035	Oak, Northern Red
Special Operations	046	Oak, Northern Red
State Department African Embassy Bombing Victims	051	Tuliptree
Swiss Internees	012	Oak, Willow
Take Pride in America Grove	054	Dogwood, Kousa
Task Force Smith	021	Cherry, Yoshino
Triple Nickels (555th Parachute Infantry Division)	023	Hemlock, Eastern
Tuskegee Airmen	046	Maple, Sugar
U.S. Army Reserves	013	Maple, October Glory Red
U.S. Colored Troops and Freed Slaves	027	Maple, Red
U.S. LST Association (Liberty Ships)	003	Oak, Willow
U.S. Navy Cruiser Association	033	Maple, Red
Unit K-West and B-East (Navy Mess Stewards)	002	Cedar, Atlas
USS Boston Shipmates	048	Oak, Northern Red
USS Canberra Association	034	Maple, Japanese
USS Frank E. Evans Association	006	Magnolia, Saucer
USS Houston and HMAS Perth	012	Zelkova, Japanese
USS Iowa Victims	060	Redbud, Eastern
USS Salem Association	012	Oak, Northern Red
USS Underhill	033	Tupelo, Black
Victims of Terrorism	055	Magnolia, Southern
Vietnam	028	Maple, Red
Vietnam Veterans (VFW Ladies Auxiliary)	048	Spruce, Colorado Blue
Vietnamese Airborne Regiment Association	047	Maple, Red
War Correspondents	046	Oak, Willow
World War I	034	Spruce, Hoopsii Blue
World War II	036	Maple, Sugar

== Nearby memorials and monuments ==
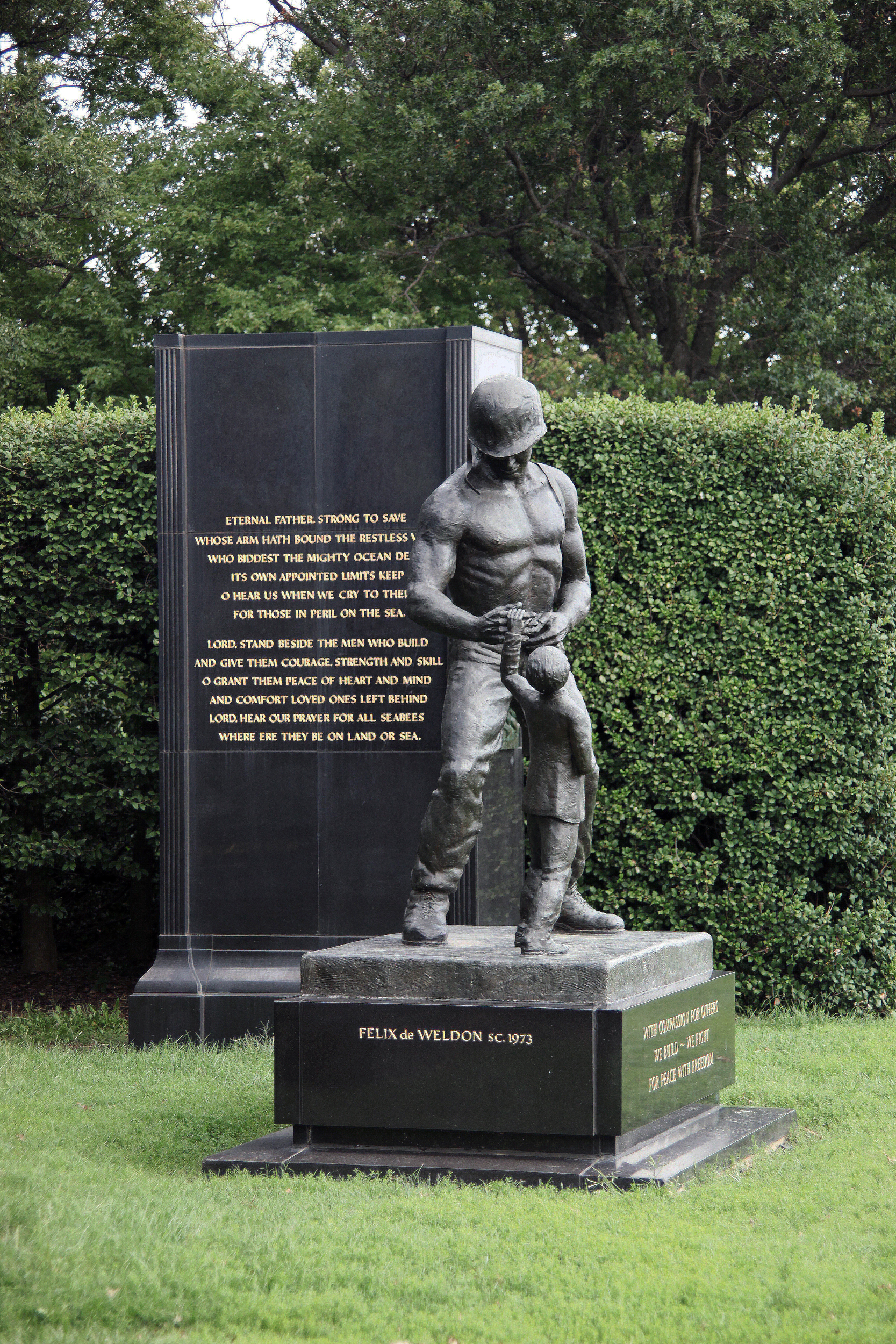
The Seabees Memorial on Memorial Avenue

Several memorials and monuments are immediately adjacent to Arlington National Cemetery. These are often mistakenly assumed to be part of the cemetery, but are not. These include:

- Marine Corps War Memorial – First erected in 1954, it is on the grounds of the George Washington Memorial Parkway about 1,000 feet (300 m) north of the cemetery.
- Netherlands Carillon – First erected in 1954, it was moved to its present location north of the cemetery in 1960. It is on the grounds of the George Washington Memorial Parkway, about 75 feet (23 m) north of the cemetery.
- Military Women's Memorial – Opened in 1997, this memorial was on the grounds of the George Washington Memorial Parkway. Although the memorial appears to be part of the ceremonial entrance to Arlington National Cemetery, it was not until the NDAA 2020 was approved on December 20, 2019, that the land was transferred from the National Park Service to the Army. Now, Memorial Drive and the Hemicycle (the front wall) of the Women In Military Service For America Memorial are located on land that is part of Arlington National Cemetery.

=== Memorial Avenue ===
A number of public improvements and memorials were planned for construction in the Washington, D.C., metropolitan area for the 1932 bicentennial of the birth of George Washington, the first President of the United States and American Revolutionary War hero. Among these were Arlington Memorial Bridge and the Mount Vernon Memorial Parkway (now known as the George Washington Memorial Parkway). To link the Virginia landing of the bridge with Arlington National Cemetery, a wide avenue known as Memorial Avenue was constructed and a new entrance to the cemetery (the Hemicycle) constructed.

Memorial Avenue is part of the George Washington Memorial Parkway. The roadway was formally transferred from the U.S. Army to the Department of the Interior in October 1940. The memorials and monuments which line Memorial Avenue are not part of Arlington National Cemetery. The memorials and monuments on Memorial Avenue include (as of 2012):

- 101st Airborne Division Memorial
- 4th Infantry (Ivy) Division Memorial
- Armored Forces Memorial
- The Hiker, the Spanish–American War Veterans Memorial
- Seabees Memorial
- Rear Admiral Richard E. Byrd, Jr. Memorial

== Bibliography ==
- Andrews, Owen and Davidson, Cameron. A Moment of Silence: Arlington National Cemetery. Indianapolis, Ind.: Wiley, 1994.
- Atkinson, Rick. Where Valor Rests: Arlington National Cemetery. Washington, D.C.: National Geographic, 2009. ISBN 1426204566
- Bigler, Philip. In Honored Glory: Arlington National Cemetery, the Final Post. Arlington, Va.: Vandamere Press, 1999.
- Chase, Enoch Aquila. "The Arlington Case: George Washington Custis Lee against the United States of America." Records of the Columbia Historical Society. 31/32: 1930.
- Cultural Landscape Program. Arlington House: The Robert E. Lee Memorial Cultural Landscape Report. National Capital Region. National Park Service. U.S. Department of the Interior. Washington, D.C.: 2001.
- Decker, Karl, and McSween, Angus. Historic Arlington. Washington, D.C.: Decker and McSween Publishing Company, 1892.
- Dodge, George W. Arlington National Cemetery. Charleston, S.C.: Arcadia Publishing, 2006.
- Goode, James M. Capital Losses: A Cultural History of Washington's Destroyed Buildings. 2d ed. Washington, D.C.: Smithsonian Institution Press, 2003. ISBN 1588341054
- Historic American Buildings Survey. Arlington National Cemetery, Ord-Weitzel Gate. HABS VA-1348-C. National Park Service. U.S. Department of the Interior. 1999. Accessed 2012-07-15.
- Historic American Buildings Survey. Arlington National Cemetery, Sheridan Gate. HABS VA-1348-B. National Park Service. U.S. Department of the Interior. 1999. Accessed 2012-07-15.
- Holt, Dean W. American Military Cemeteries. Jefferson, N.C.: McFarland & Co., 2010.
- Hughes, Nathaniel Cheairs and Ware, Thomas Clayton. Theodore O'Hara: Poet-Soldier of the Old South. Knoxville, Tenn.: University of Tennessee Press, 1998.
- McCaslin, Richard B. Lee in the Shadow of Washington. Baton Rouge: Louisiana State University Press, 2004.
- Peters, James Edward. Arlington National Cemetery, Shrine to America's Heroes. Bethesda, Md.: Woodbine House, 2000.
- Polk, David. History of the Third Infantry Division. Paducah, Ky.: Turner Publishing Co., 1994.
- Poole, Robert M. On Hallowed Ground: The Story of Arlington National Cemetery. New York: Walker & Co., 2009.
- Silber, Nina. Landmarks of the Civil War. New York: Oxford University Press, 2003.
- United States Commission of Fine Arts. Tenth Report. Washington, D.C.: U.S. Government Printing Office, 1926.
