= Spanish–American War Nurses Memorial =

Memorial in Arlington National Cemetery, USA

- United States
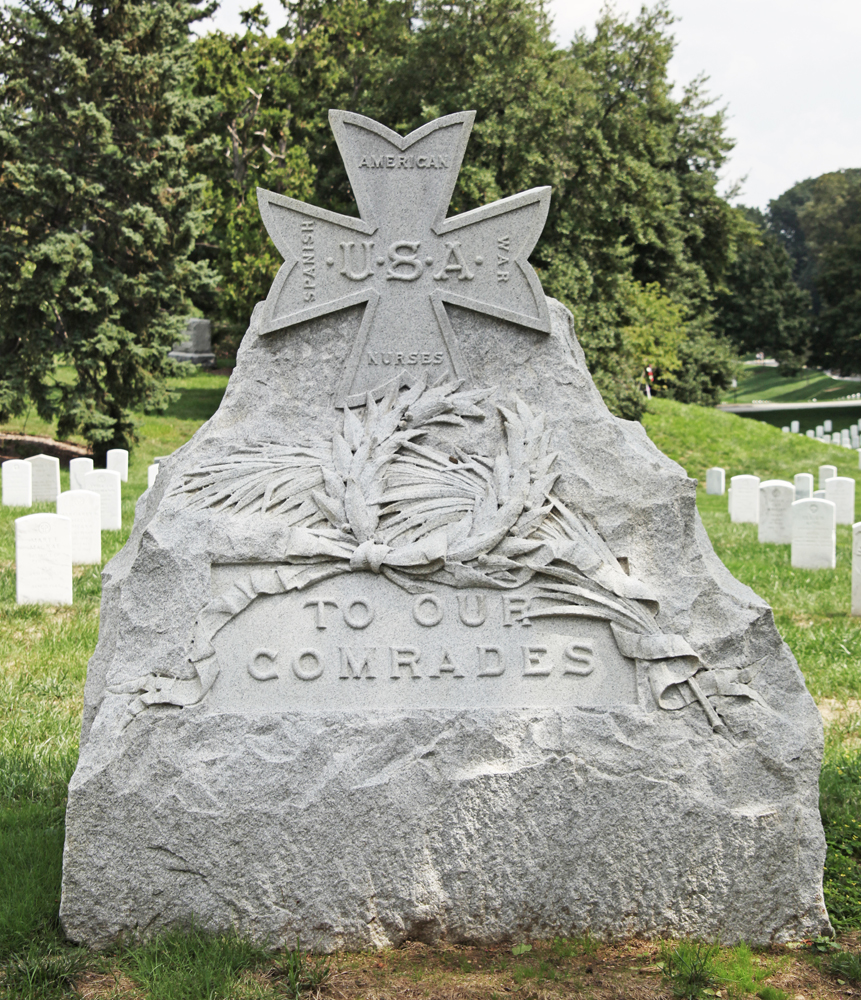
- Spanish–American War Nurses Memorial in 2011
- For those American nurses who died in the Spanish–American War
- Unveiled: May 4, 1905; 121 years ago
- Location: 38.874862°N 77.075214°W near Arlington County, Virginia, U.S.

The Spanish–American War Nurses Memorial is a memorial in Arlington National Cemetery in Arlington County, Virginia, in the United States that commemorates those American nurses who died in the Spanish–American War in 1898. The rough-hewn, grey granite memorial was erected by the Order of Spanish–American War Nurses on May 2, 1905. It stands in the southwestern corner of Section 21, where the first Spanish–American War nurses are buried.

The memorial should not be confused with the Nurses Memorial. This 8-foot (2.4 m) tall marble figure of a nurse in a nurse's uniform and cape was erected in 1938. It also stands in Section 21, a short distance away. It is screened from the northern part of Section 21 by a copse of trees.

== Nurses in the Spanish–American War ==
The Spanish–American War was a ten-week conflict that occurred in the spring and summer of 1898. Cuba had been waging a war of independence against Spain since 1895, an effort largely supported by the United States (which had extensive economic interests on the island). To ensure the safety of American citizens and property in Cuba, the United States sent the battleship USS Maine (ACR-1) to Havana in late January 1898. The Maine exploded and was destroyed with large loss of life on February 15. American newspapers whipped up war fever, and held Spain responsible for the ship's destruction. The United States Congress enacted a joint resolution demanding independence for Cuba, and President William McKinley signed it into law on April 20. In response, Spain severed diplomatic relations on April 21. The same day, the United States Navy began a blockade of Cuba. Spain declared war on April 23. On April 25, Congress declared that a state of war between the U.S. and Spain had existed since April 21.

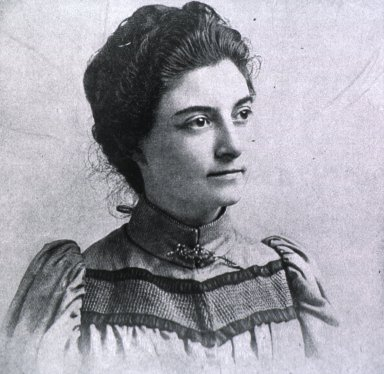
Dr. Anita Newcomb McGee led the push for a memorial.

The Spanish–American War began on April 25, 1898, and ended on August 12, 1898. Cuban and Spanish dead vastly outnumbered American deaths. While 2,910 American military personnel died during the war, just 345 were combat deaths. The rest died of disease. The U.S. military barred women from serving in any capacity prior to the war. Although the Army had 791 nurses, they were all male, and far too few to provide the medical care needed. Soldiers resisted being transferred from combat units into the nursing corps, and few volunteers signed up for medical duty. Congress quickly authorized the military to hire female nurses—but on contract, not as military personnel. The army reached out specifically to the Daughters of the American Revolution (DAR), a patriotic society, to recruit women nurses. Dr. Anita Newcomb McGee, one of the medical doctors practicing in the United States, was asked to lead the DAR's recruitment effort. Of the 1,563 nurses recruited for the new DAR Hospital Corps, most served in hospitals in the United States. Only 76 were sent to Cuba, 30 to the Philippines, nine to Puerto Rico, six to Honolulu, and eight served aboard the hospital ship USS Relief. It was the first time in American history where nurses were fully accepted in military hospitals.

Although no nurses were killed in combat, 140 died of typhoid and 13 from other diseases. (One of the 13 died of yellow fever after being experimented upon by the army.) Since nearly all the nurses died in the United States, most were sent home to their families for burial. A handful died overseas, and were buried there. On July 8, 1898, Congress enacted legislation authorizing the repatriation of American dead, and appropriating funds for this purpose. Additional legislation was enacted on February 9, 1900; May 26, 1900; and June 6, 1900. Many of the dead were buried at Arlington National Cemetery, either because their families desired it or the remains could not be identified.

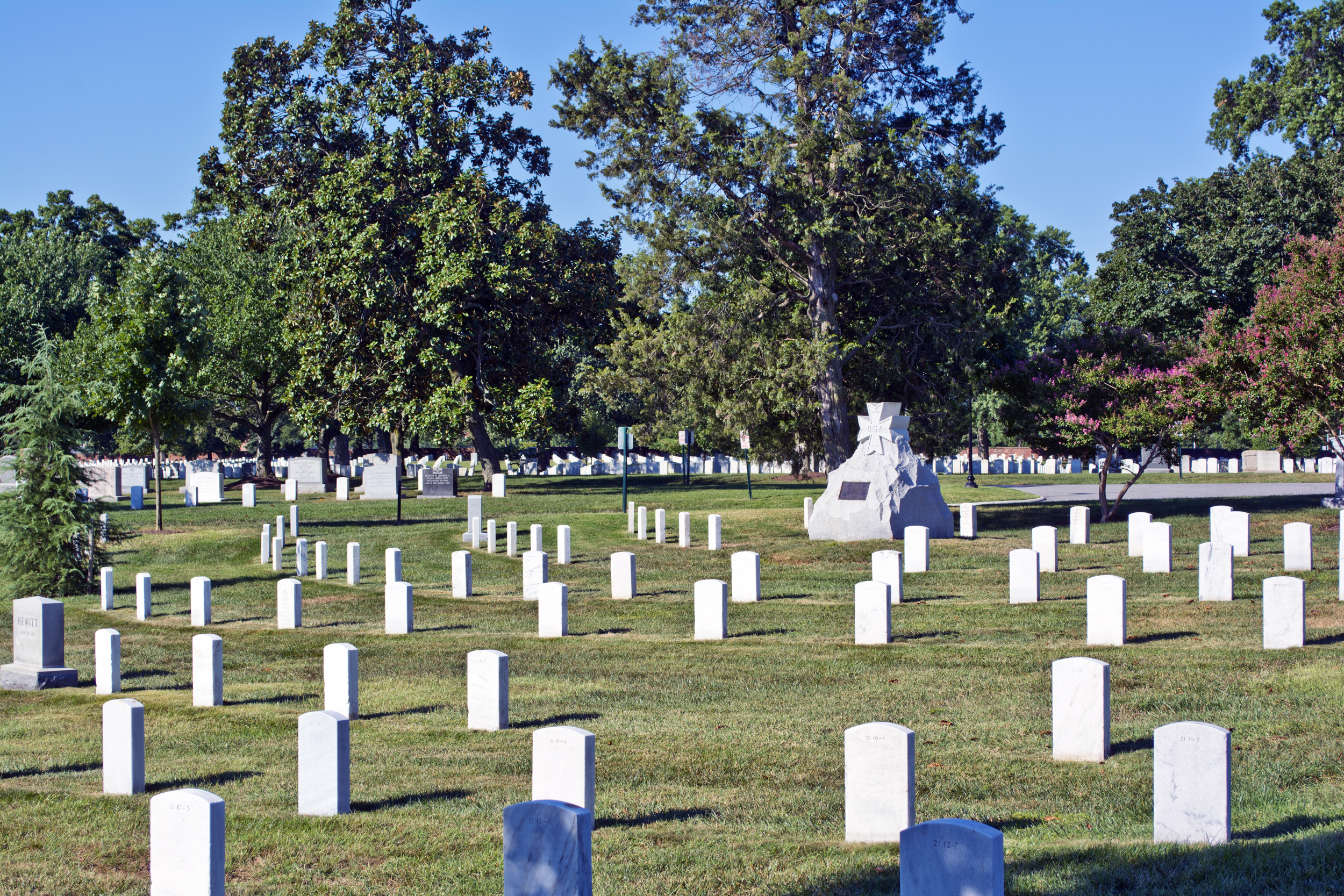
Nurses section at the cemetery

The first Spanish–American War nurse to be buried at Arlington National Cemetery was Anna H. Campos, who died in Cuba on September 2, 1899. Her remains were repatriated about May 1900. By February 1901, the military had repatriated a few of the bodies of nurses who had died overseas. For families which wished it, or where remains went unclaimed or unidentified, the bodies were buried at Arlington. These nurses were buried in what is now Section 21. Over time, more military nurses were buried next to them, creating a "nurses' section". The U.S. Army Quartermaster Corps had control of Arlington National Cemetery at the time. In late 1906, Brigadier General Charles F. Humphrey, Sr., Quartermaster General, gave permission for any Army nurse who wished to be buried at Arlington National Cemetery with military honors.

== Creating a memorial ==
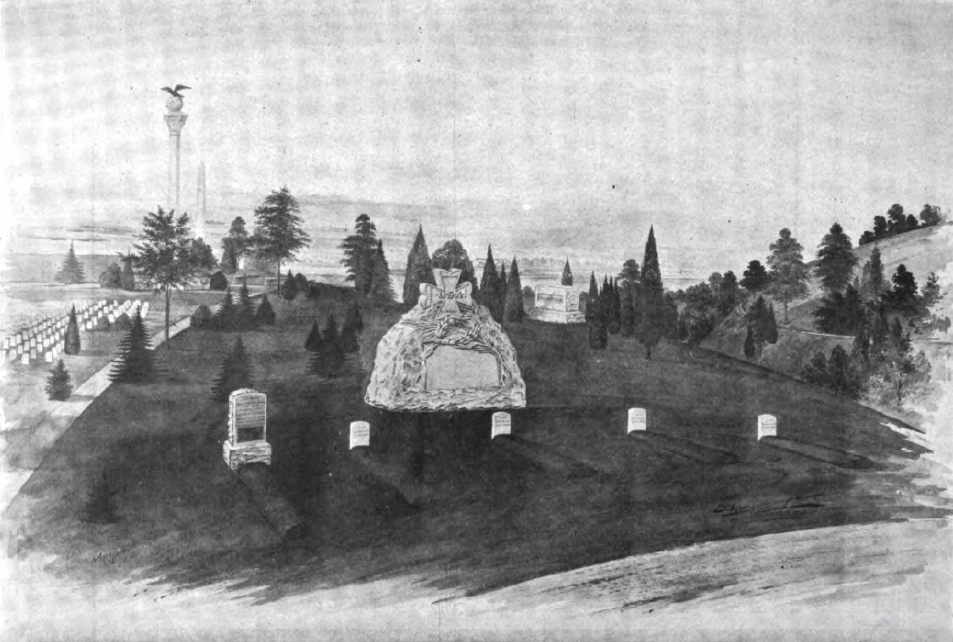
Winning design for the Spanish–American War Nurses Memorial.

In June 1899, Dr. Anita Newcomb McGee co-founded the Order of Spanish–American War Nurses to (among other things) commemorate the service of contract nurses during the Spanish–American War and serve as an advocate for nurses within the U.S. military. At the founding convention on August 7, 1899, Order members agreed to sponsor a $10,000 "Nurses' Monument" ($387,000 in 2025 dollars) to military nurses at Arlington National Cemetery. Order dues were 25 cents ($10 in 2025 dollars), and the organization proposed that any dues money left over after the organization's expenses were paid should go toward the monument. By October 1, an additional $158.75 ($6,144 in 2025 dollars) in contributions had been raised.

Approval for the memorial was not quickly forthcoming. A memorial committee was established by the Order of Spanish War Nurses, chaired by Miss Esther Hasson of New York. But by November 1901, the Secretary of War Elihu Root had not yet given approval for the memorial. Fundraising, too, was going slowly, and only $265.63 ($10,280 in 2025 dollars) was in the order's memorial fund. The order received word that the Army had set aside a site near the western corner of what is now Section 21 for the memorial in late 1902. But this decision was not a formal one. In the late summer of 1903, however, Dr. McGee received assurance from Secretary of War Root and Quartermaster General Humphrey that the order could erect a memorial in Section 21. However, General Humphrey requested that order erect a simple, artistic monument rather than anything elaborate.

=== Choosing a design ===
At the order's annual meeting on August 22, 1903, the Order of Spanish–American War Nurses debated the nature of the memorial they wished to erect. The original intent of the order was to honor all trained nurses, untrained "immune" nurses, Catholic sisters, male contract nurses, and any enlisted hospital corpsmen buried in the section. But none of these were actually buried at Arlington in the section assigned for the memorial. In fact, by July 1903, only two immune nurses and two soldiers were buried in Section 21. President McGee said members had expressed their disinclination to commemorate all nurses from all wars buried at Arlington, and the order was barred from erecting a memorial to itself. McGee proposed that the memorial honor all female nurses from the Spanish–American War (whom she called "our comrades"), or just trained female nurses. She asked the delegates to consider the issue, and make an explicit choice when it voted the following day.

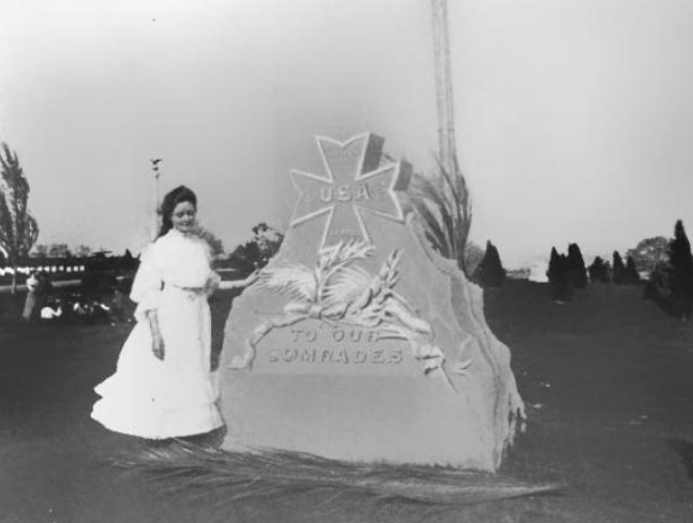
Miss Klotho McGee stands next to the memorial after its unveiling in May 1905.

Later that day, the Committee on Monument issued its report to the membership Committee chair Esther Hasson noted that several designs had been submitted, including one from Tiffany & Co. (although the process for requesting designs was not reported in the media). The cost of the more elaborate memorials was in the $3,000 range ($107,500 in 2025 dollars). However, Hasson said, Quartermaster General Humphreys had indicated in July 1903 that the Army's preference was for a simple stone memorial with an inscription, a design which would cost less than $1,000 ($35,833 in 2025 dollars). The committee noted that this eliminated any memorial incorporating a bronze tablet, bas-relief figures, or elaborate carving. The committee noted that its preference was for a simple monument approximate in size and cost to that suggested by the Army. The Monument committee submitted a resolution proposing that the monument fund be raised to $3,000 ($107,500 in 2025 dollars); that a committee of three be appointed by the chair to produce a monument acceptable to the committee and the Secretary of War as quickly as possible; and that this monument be dedicated to "deceased army nurses in the National Cemetery at Arlington, Virginia". The motion passed. The chair immediately appointed Miss Amanda J. Armistead, Miss Isabelle J. Walton, Miss Edith H. Rutley to the Special Committee on Monument.

On August 23, the Special Committee on Monument made a verbal report to the order (the contents of which were not revealed in the media), which was followed by vigorous discussion. But the members voted to delay action until next annual meeting in September 1904.

By November 1903, the memorial fund stood at only $346.66 ($12,422 in 2025 dollars).

The 1904 annual meeting of the Order of Spanish–American War Nurses was scheduled for early September at the Louisiana Purchase Exposition in St. Louis, Missouri. However, at the request of Dr. McGee, the meeting was postponed until November 7, 1904 (although the meeting location was not altered). When the order met in St. Louis, the membership voted unanimous to erect a nurses' memorial with all due speed. But no design for the monument was chosen. The total cost of the memorial was also not reported, but Dr. McGee requested that each member donate $2 ($72 in 2025 dollars) to bring monument fund to amount needed. By November 1, 1904, just $187 ($6,701 in 2025 dollars) had been raised, bringing the monument fund to $546.84 ($19,595 in 2025 dollars).

By mid-December 1904, the Special Monument Committee of the Order of Spanish–American War Nurses had yet to choose a design, even though many members favored the figure of a nurse.

Time began to press on the Order of Spanish–American War Nurses. More than six years had elapsed since the monument was first proposed, and donations were only trickling in. Eighteen months had passed since the Secretary of War gave his consent to erect a monument, and there seemed little reason to believe that more time would allow the order to construct a grander memorial. In early 1905, the order contracted with Barclay Bros., a granite company in Barre, Vermont, to produce the memorial.

=== Dedication ===
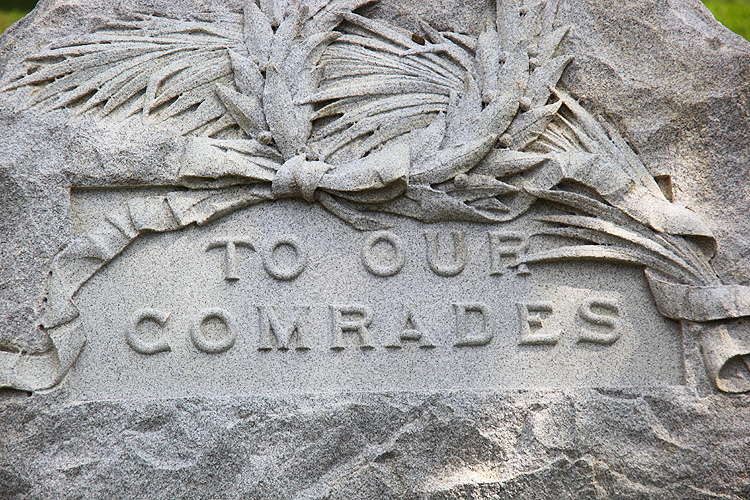
The Spanish–American War Nurses Memorial is dedicated to "our comrades"—all female nurses who provided nursing services during the war.

The dedication for the Spanish–American War Nurses Memorial was set for 3:00 P.M. on May 2, 1905. The Order of Spanish–American War Nurses established a dedication committee to plan the memorial's unveiling. The committee had great difficulty in getting speakers to commit to the ceremony, and in setting a program. They were successful, however, in persuading Colonel Charles P. Morton, commander of the 7th Cavalry at Fort Myer, to provide a military band.

The dedication ceremony was not elaborate, but it was symbolic. A temporary pole made of bamboo from the Philippines was erected next to the memorial, and palm branches from Cuba and Puerto Rico were bunched about its base. At the top of the pole was a laurel wreath festooned with red, white, and blue ribbons. Around the foot of the monument, more palm branches were spread. An honor guard of 25 veterans from the Washington, D.C., chapter of the Spanish War Veterans stood around the memorial.

Dignitaries at the event included Dr. Anita Newcomb McGee (who presided over the ceremony); M. Emmett Urell, Colonel, USA (ret.), past commander of the Grand Army of the Republic; Dr. Clifford Cox, commander, Spanish–American War Veterans; Mrs. Emily N.R. McClean, president, Daughters of the American Revolution; surviving Civil War nurses from Washington, D.C. (all members of the National Association of Army Nurses of the Civil War); Colonel Morton and several U.S. Army and U.S. Navy officers; and a representative from the Embassy of Japan. A marquee was erected near the memorial site to shelter them.

The dedication ceremony was simple. Father Thomas McGuigan of St. Patrick's Catholic Church provided an invocation. Dr. McGee spoke briefly, followed by Dr. Cox. A poem by Rudyard Kipling was read, and then 15-year-old Klotho McGee (Dr. McGee's daughter) unveiled the monument as the 7th Cavalry Band played The Star-Spangled Banner. Mrs. McLean delivered a lengthy address as the highlight of the ceremony. An Army chaplain gave a benediction, and a bugler from Fort Myer played Taps.

== About the memorial ==
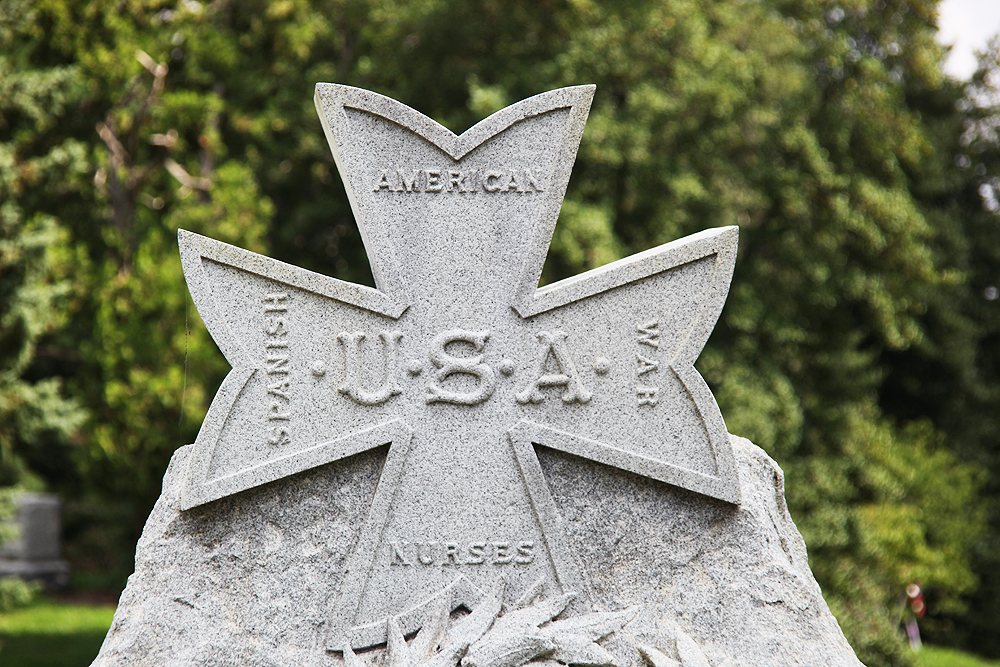
The logo of the Order of Spanish–American War Nurses adorns the top of the memorial.

The Spanish–American War Nurses Memorial is located along the southwestern edge of Section 21 in Arlington National Cemetery. Porter Avenue runs southeast-to-northwest in front of the memorial, while Lawton Avenue is a short distance to the north. Porter and Lawton Avenues meet McPherson Avenue near where the memorial lies. The Battle of the Bulge Memorial is a few feet away to the northwest.

The memorial consists of a single rough-hewn, grey granite boulder approximately 6 feet (1.8 m) wide, 3.5 feet (1.1 m) across, and 7 feet (2.1 m) high. At the top of the memorial in solid granite is a Maltese cross, the insignia of the Order of the Spanish–American War Nurses. The insignia is on both the front and rear of the memorial.

On the front of the memorial are carved in bas-relief several palm branches, which lean to the left and shade the panel below. A laurel wreath lies atop the palm branches. The wreath has a bow at its base. One of the long, trailing ribbons of stone appears to be loosely draped over the right side of the panel, where it wraps around the base of the palm fronds. The other trailing ribbon appears to be loosely draped to the left of the panel. The wreath, fronds, and ribbon partially obscured the top, upper left corner, and upper right corner of the panel. Below the wreath and fronds is a sunk panel with inscription "To Our Comrades".

On the rear of the monument, the Maltese cross insignia is at the top. A third of the way up from the ground, a bronze plaque is set into the rough-hewn grey granite. It reads: "In Memory of the Women Who Gave Their Lives As Army Nurses In 1898. Erected by the Society of Spanish American War Nurses."

The memorial was dedicated to 13 nurses who died in the Spanish–American War. It is one of three Spanish–American War memorials at the cemetery. The other two are the Spanish–American War Memorial and the Rough Riders Memorial. A fourth memorial, a copy of the statue The Hiker, stands on Memorial Drive outside the cemetery's boundaries.

== Bibliography ==
- "Barre News." Granite, Marble, and Bronze. 15:6 (June 1, 1905), 22–24.
- Bigler, Philip. In Honored Glory: Arlington National Cemetery, the Final Post. Arlington, Va.: Vandamere Press, 1999.
- Dyal, Donald H; Carpenter, Brian B.; and Thomas, Mark A. Historical Dictionary of the Spanish American War. Westport, Conn.: Greenwood Press, 1996.
- Gurney, Gene. Arlington National Cemetery: A Picture Story of America's Most Famous Burial Grounds from the Civil War to President John F. Kennedy's Burial. New York: Crown Publishers, 1965.
- Holt, Dean W. American Military Cemeteries. 2d ed. Jefferson, N.C.: McFarland & Co., 2010.
- "In the Nursing World." The Trained Nurse and Hospital Review. 22:6 (June 1899), 310–317.
- "In the Nursing World." The Trained Nurse and Hospital Review. 23:5 (November 1899), 306–310.
- "In the Nursing World." The Trained Nurse and Hospital Review. 38:1 (January 1907), 36–48.
- "In the Nursing World." The Trained Nurse and Hospital Review. 32:3 (March 1904), 187–190.
- "In the Nursing World." The Trained Nurse and Hospital Review. 34:4 (April 1905), 262–272.
- "In the Nursing World." The Trained Nurse and Hospital Review. 34:6 (June 1905), 397–398.
- "In the Nursing World." The Trained Nurse and Hospital Review. 35:1 (July 1905), 33–47.
- Judd, Deborah M.; Stizman, Kathleen; and Davis, Megan. A History of American Nursing: Trends and Eras. Sudbury, Mass.: Jones and Bartlett Publishers, 2010.
- Knuckle, Robert. Black Jack: America's Famous Riderless Horse. Burnstown, Ont.: General Store Publishing House, 2002.
- McCallum, Jack. "Medicine, Military." In The Encyclopedia of the Spanish–American and Philippine–American Wars: A Political, Social, and Military History. Spencer Tucker, ed. Santa Barbara, Calif.: ABC-CLIO, 2009.
- McGee, Anita Newcomb. "Department of Army Nursing: Army Notes." Trained Nurse and Hospital Review. 24:6 (June 1900), 447–448.
- "Official Reports of Societies." American Journal of Nursing. 4:2 (November 1903), 125–146.
- "Official Reports of Societies." American Journal of Nursing. 4:12 (September 1904), 961–994.
- Peters, Edward James. Arlington National Cemetery: Shrine to America's Heroes. 2d ed. Bethesda, Md.: Woodbine House, 2000.
- Potter, Jane. "'I Begin to Feel as a Human Being Should, In Spite of the Blood and Anguish In Which I Move': American Women's First World War Nursing Memoirs." In First World War Nursing: Visions and Revisions. Alison S. Fell and Christine E. Hallett, eds. Florence, Ky.: Taylor & Francis, Apr 29, 2013.
- Prieto, Laura R. "Spanish–American War, Womaen and The." In Women and War: A Historical Encyclopedia From Antiquity to the Present. Bernard A. Cook, ed. Santa Barbara, Calif.: ABC-CLIO, 2006.
- "Proposed Monuments and Monument News." Granite, Marble, and Bronze. 15:1 (January 1, 1905), 54–58.
- Quartermaster Corps. Annual Report of the Quartermaster General of the Operations of the Quartermaster's Department for the Fiscal Year Ending on the 30th of June 1900. Washington, D.C.: Government Printing Office, 1900.
- "Reports of Chiefs of Bureaus." In Annual Reports of the War Department for the Fiscal Year Ended June 30, 1901. Volume 1, Part 2. Washington, D.C.: Government Printing Office, 1901.
- "Reports of Societies." American Journal of Nursing. 2:2 (November 1901), 121–128.
- "Reports of Societies." American Journal of Nursing. 3:4 (January 1903), 305–310.
- Sandhoff, Michelle and Segal, Mady Wechsler. "Women in the U.S. Military: The Evolution of Gender Norms and Military Requirements." In The Modern American Military. David M. Kennedy, ed. New York: Oxford University Press, 2013.
- Skaine, Rosemarie. Women at War: Gender Issues of Americans in Combat. Jefferson, N.C.: McFarland, 1999.
- Styles, Margretta M.; Moccia, Patricia; Evans, Nancy G. "The Importance of a Literature on Nursing." On Nursing: A Literary Celebration: An Anthology. Margretta M. Styles, Patricia Moccia, and Nancy G. Evans. eds. New York: National League for Nursing Press, 1993.
- Trask, David F. The War With Spain in 1898. Lincoln, Neb.: University of Nebraska Press, 1996.
