= Seabees Memorial =

Coordinates: 38.88498°N 77.06263°W

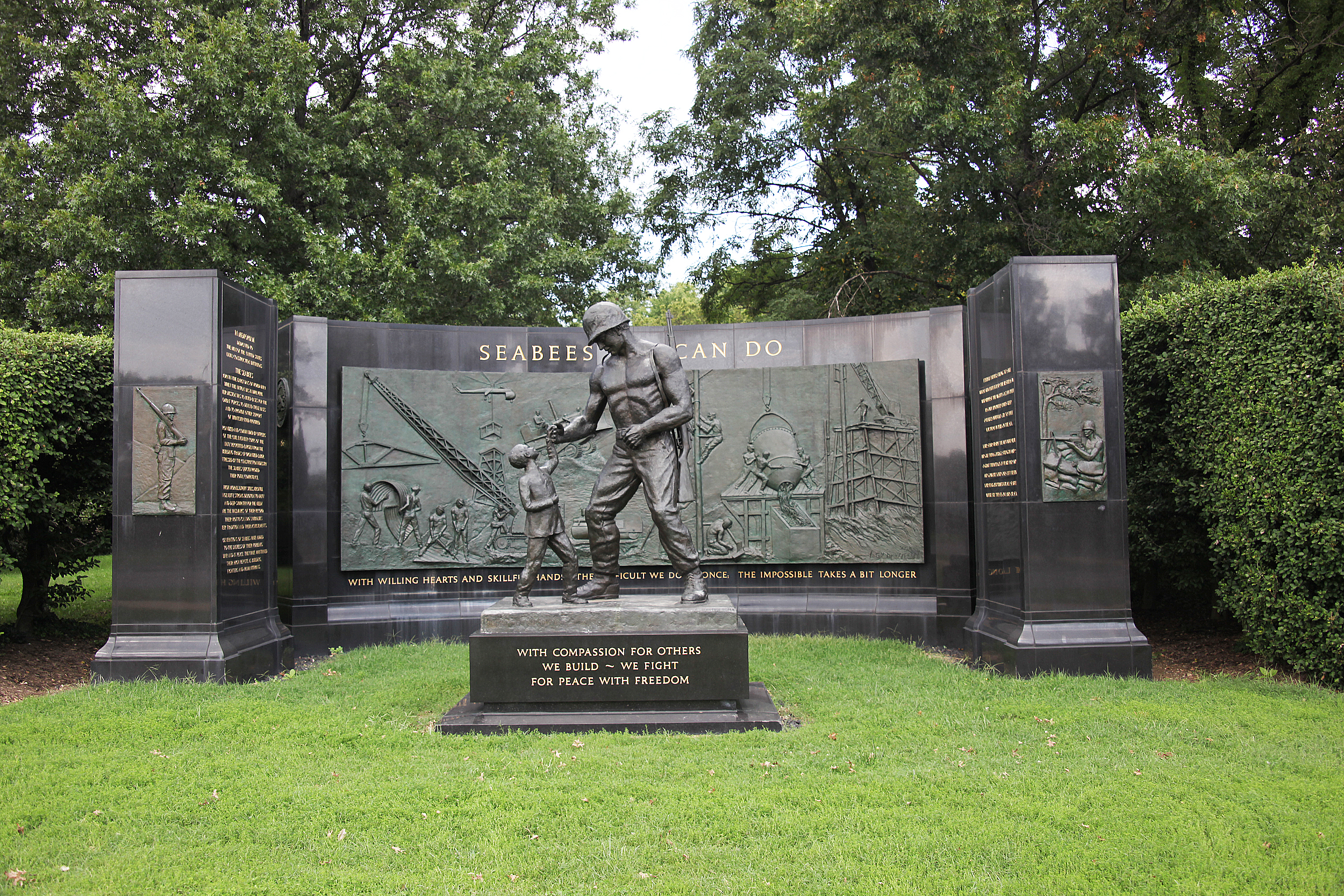
- The memorial in 2011
- Interactive map of Seabees Memorial
- Location: Arlington, Virginia, United States
- Designer: Felix de Weldon

The Seabees Memorial is a sculpture and memorial to Seabees by Felix de Weldon, installed along Memorial Drive near the entrance of Arlington National Cemetery. It is administered by the National Park Service as part of George Washington Memorial Parkway in Arlington, Virginia.

Congress authorized the placement of a memorial on public land by the Seabee Memorial Association in September 1972. It was dedicated on Memorial Day 1974.

== Description ==
The memorial features panels depicting Seabee missions since 1942. According to the CEC/Seabee Historical Foundation, the bronze figure at the center of the memorial depicts a "bare-chested, muscular SEABEE, rifle slung over one shoulder, offering a helping hand to a small child."

Gold-colored inscriptions above and below the panels read "SEABEES CAN DO" and "With willing hearts and skillful hands, the difficult we do at once. The impossible takes a bit longer!", respectively. The base which supports the figure sculpture is the inscribed text: "With compassion for others / we build – we fight / for peace with freedom".

== See also ==
- List of memorials and monuments at Arlington National Cemetery
- United States Navy Memorial
