= Civil War Unknowns Monument =

Monument at Arlington National Cemetery, Arlington, VA, US

- United States
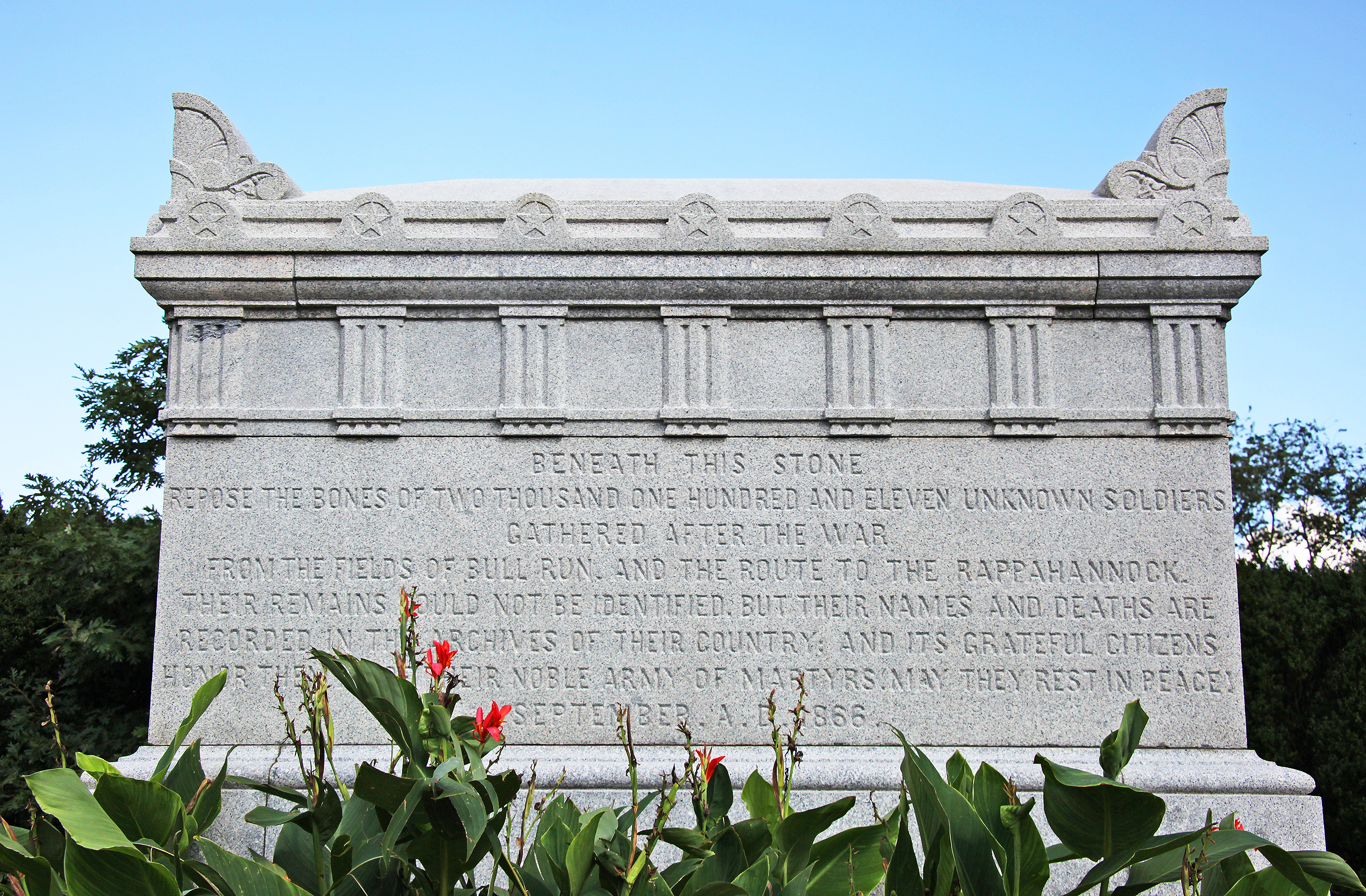
- West face of the Civil War Unknowns Monument
- For the unknown dead of the American Civil War
- Unveiled: 1865; 161 years ago
- Location: 38.880416°N 77.073183°W near Arlington, Virginia, U.S.

The Civil War Unknowns Monument is a burial vault and memorial honoring unidentified dead from the American Civil War. It is located in the grounds of Arlington House, The Robert E. Lee Memorial, at Arlington National Cemetery in Arlington, Virginia, in the United States. It was designed by Quartermaster General Montgomery C. Meigs and constructed in 1865.

Many sources often incorrectly state that the monument was constructed in the middle of the Lee flower garden (often mischaracterized as a "rose garden"). However, the monument is just west of the flower garden, in what was once a grove of oak and elm trees.

== History of the site ==
=== Construction of Arlington House and "the Grove" ===
In 1778, John Parke Custis purchased an 1,100-acre (450 ha) tract of forested land on the Potomac River north of the town of Alexandria, Virginia. This land became the Arlington Estate. John Custis died in September 1781, and in 1799 his son, George Washington Parke Custis ("G.W.P.")—step-grandson of George Washington—inherited the site. G.W.P Custis and his wife, Mary, moved onto the estate, and between 1802 and 1814 they constructed Arlington House. The Custises extensively developed the site. Much of the steep slope to the east of the house became a cultivated English landscape park, while a large flower garden with an arbor was constructed and planted south of the house.

To the west of Arlington House, tall grass and low native plants led down a slope into a natural area of close-growing trees the Custises called "the Grove." About 60 feet (18 m) to the west of the flower garden, "the Grove" contained tall elm and oak trees which formed a canopy. An informal flower garden was planted beneath the trees and maintained by the Custis daughters. It is not clear when "the Grove" began to be developed, but it was under way by at least 1853.

G.W.P.'s daughter, Mary Anna Randolph Custis, married Robert E. Lee, an impoverished lieutenant in the United States Army, in June 1831. The Lees took up residence at Arlington House. Mary Custis died in 1853, and Mary Custis Lee had her buried in "the Grove". G.W.P. Custis died in October 1857, and he was buried next to his wife in Arlington Forest near "the Grove".

=== Cemetery ===
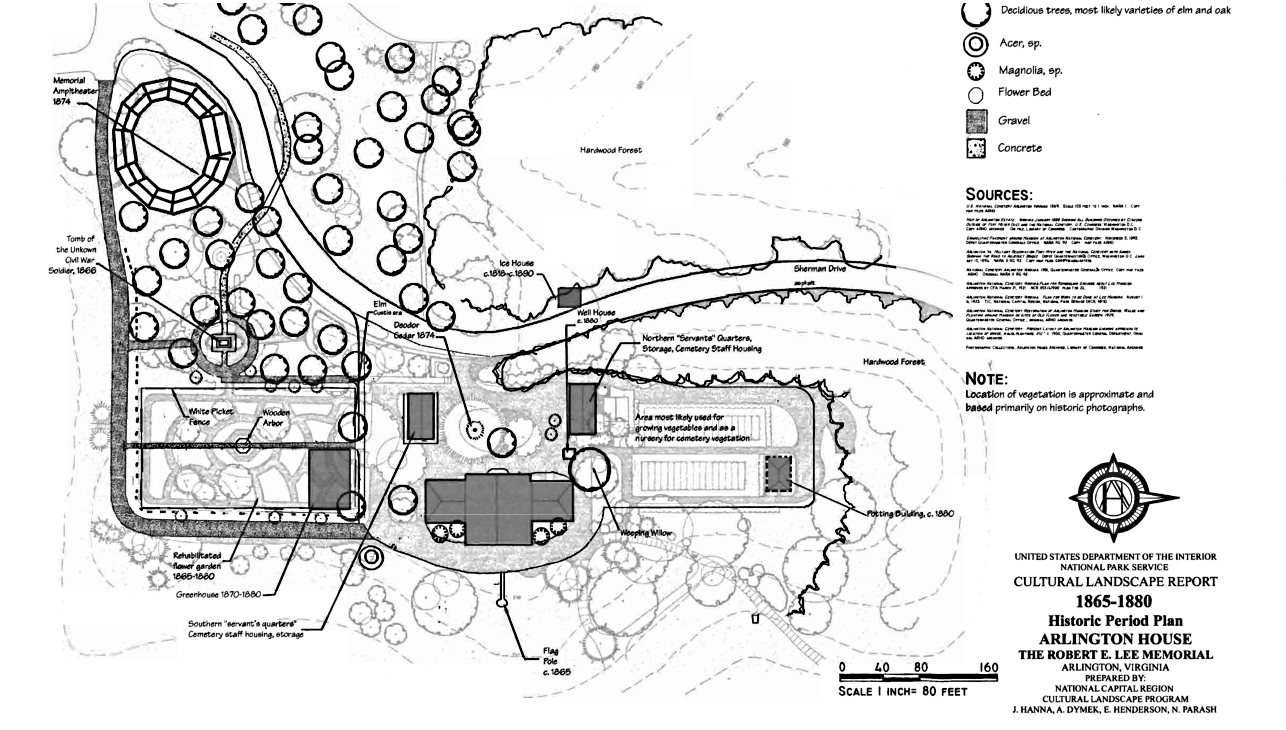
Map of the grounds of Arlington National Cemetery as they existed between 1865 and 1880. The location of the Civil War Unknowns Monument can be seen west of (not within) the Lee flower garden.

Arlington Estate's history changed forever with the outbreak of the American Civil War. Robert E. Lee resigned from the United States Army on April 20, 1861, and took command of Virginia's armed forces on April 23. Armed forces loyal to the United States ("Union" forces) realized that artillery placed on the heights of the estate would be able to shell the city of Washington at will. Realizing Union forces were likely to seize her home, Mary Custis Lee packed up most of her belongings and fled to her family estate at Ravensworth on May 17. On May 24, Union troops occupied Arlington Estate and Arlington House.

On July 16, 1862, the United States Congress passed legislation authorizing the U.S. federal government to purchase land for national cemeteries for military dead, and put the U.S. Army Quartermaster General in charge of this program. The Soldiers' Home in nearby Washington, D.C., and the Alexandria Cemetery were the primary burying grounds for war dead in the D.C. area, but by late 1863 both cemeteries were full. In May 1864, large numbers of Union forces died in the Battle of the Wilderness. Quartermaster General Montgomery C. Meigs ordered that an examination of eligible sites be made for the establishment for a large new national military cemetery. Within weeks, his staff reported that Arlington Estate was the most suitable property in the area. The property was high and free from floods (which might unearth graves), it had a view of the District of Columbia, and it was aesthetically pleasing. It was also the home of the leader of the armed forces of the Confederate States of America, and denying Robert E. Lee use of his home after the war was a valuable political consideration. Although the first military burial at Arlington had been made on May 13,. of Private William Christman Meigs did not authorize establishment of burials until June 15, 1864.

Although most burials initially occurred near the freedmen's cemetery in the northeast corner of the estate, Meigs ordered in mid-June 1864 that burials commence immediately on the grounds of Arlington House. The first officer burial had occurred next to the main flower garden on May 17, but with Meigs' order another 44 officers were buried along the southern and eastern sides of this area within a month. In December 1865, Robert E. Lee's brother, Sydney Smith Lee, visited Arlington House and observed that the house could be made livable again if the graves around the flower garden were removed. Meigs hated Lee for betraying the Union, and ordered that more burials occur near the house in order to make it politically impossible for disinterment to occur.

== Design and construction of the memorial ==
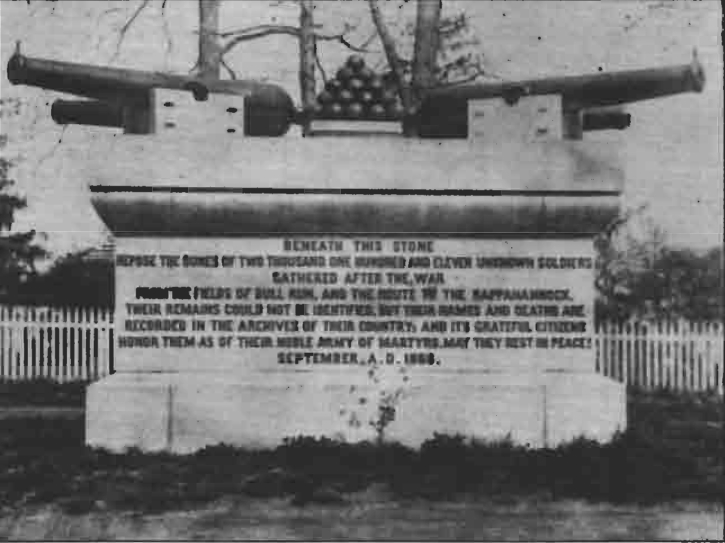
The Civil War Unknowns Monument c. 1866, shortly after it was constructed. The white picket fence in the rear marks the western boundary of the Lee flower garden.

By 1865, most of "the Grove" had been lost. Its flower beds and paths had been trampled out of existence by troops and pack animals, and some of its trees had been cut down. That year, Meigs decided to build a monument to Civil War dead in the center of "the Grove". U.S. Army troops were dispatched to investigate every battlefield within a 35-mile (56 km) radius of the city of Washington, D.C. The bodies of 2,111 Union and Confederate dead were collected, most of them from the battlefields of First and Second Bull Run as well as the Union army's retreat along the Rappahannock River (which occurred after both battles). Some of the dead had been interred on the battlefield, but most were full or partial remains discovered unburied on the field of battle. None were identifiable. Although Meigs had not intended to collect the remains of Confederate war dead, the inability to identify remains meant that both Union and Confederate dead were interred below the cenotaph.

U.S. Army engineers chopped down the trees in eastern half of "the Grove", leaving only a small copse to the west. They dug a circular pit about 20 feet (6.1 m) wide and 20 feet (6.1 m) deep into the earth. The walls and floor were lined with brick, and it was segmented it into compartments with mortared brick walls. Into each compartment were placed a different body part: skulls, legs, arms, ribs, etc. The vault was half full by the time it was ready for sealing in September 1866. The vault was sealed with concrete and soil. Meigs designed a 6-foot (1.8 m) tall, 12-foot (3.7 m) long, 4-foot (1.2 m) wide grey granite and concrete cenotaph to rest on top of the burial vault. The cenotaph consisted of two long light grey granite slabs, with the shorter ends formed by sandwiching a smaller slab between the longer two. On the west face was an inscription describing the number of dead in the vault below, and honoring the "unknowns of the Civil War".

Originally, a Rodman gun was placed on each corner, and a pyramid of shot adorned the center of the lid. A circular walk, centered 45 feet (14 m) from the center of the memorial, provided access. A walk led east to the flower garden, and another west to a road. Sod was laid around the memorial, and planting beds filled with annual plants emplaced.

== Changes to the memorial since 1865 ==
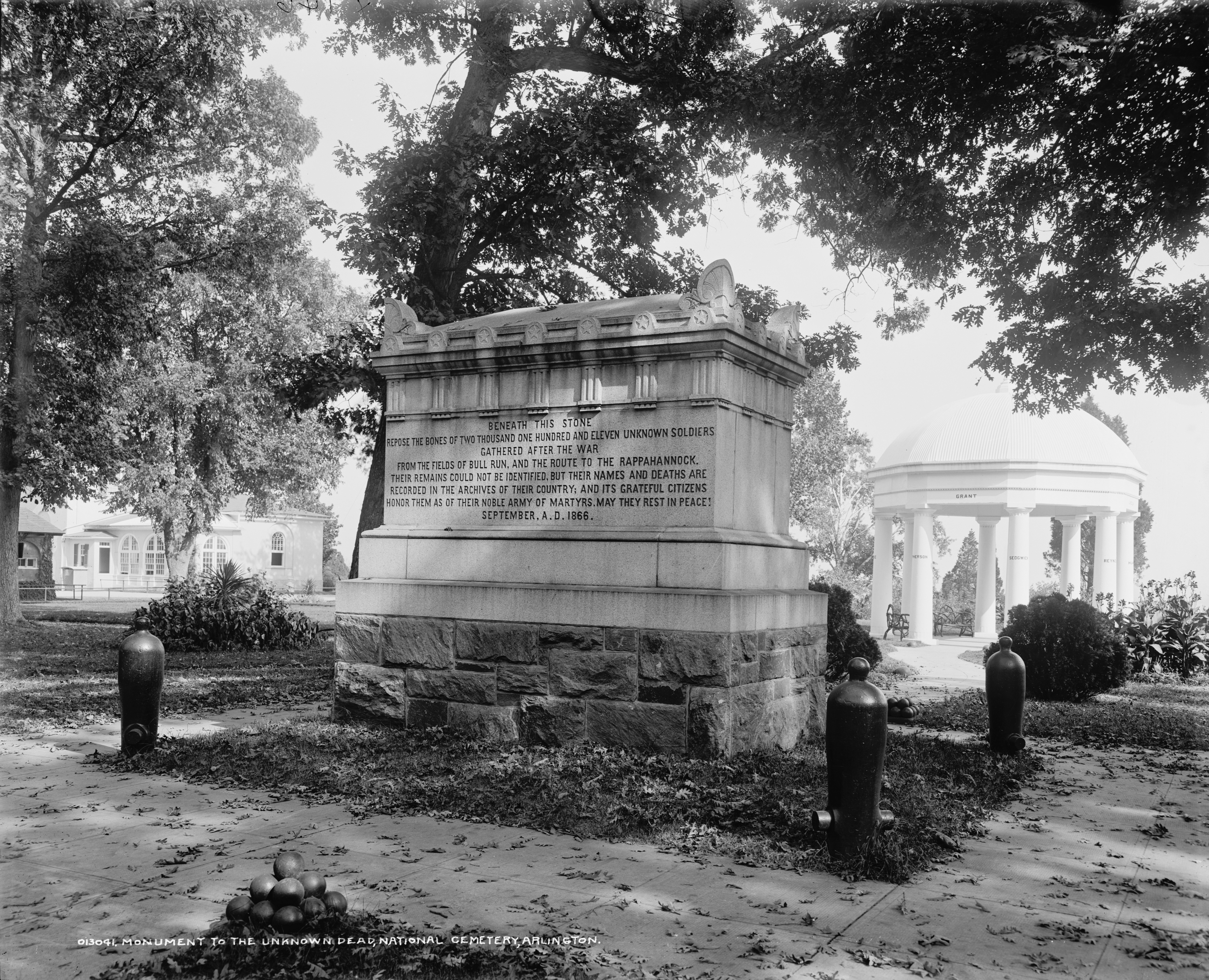
The Civil War Unknowns Monument c. 1900, showing the new decorative lid, the changed position of the Rodman guns, and the new location of the shot pyramids.

By 1893, the original monument had been radically changed. The plain sarcophagus walls were replaced with more ornate ones, although the inscription had been retained. The lid was replaced by one modeled after the Ark of the Covenant described in the Book of Exodus in the Hebrew Bible. The Rodman guns were placed muzzle-down into the earth, and the large pyramid of shot removed from the lid. Four small pyramids of shot were placed on either side of the east and west pathways leading to the memorial. The memorial was also raised off the earth onto a slightly larger base of rough-hewn dark grey granite blocks mortared together. This base is three stones high, or about 3 feet (0.91 m). A second base of large light grey granite slabs about 1 foot (0.30 m) high was placed on top of the first base. A third base, consisting of a single light grey granite slab, was installed above the second base. This third base was slightly smaller than the first two, but slightly larger than the memorial itself. Four light grey granite sections about 6 to 9 inches (15 to 23 cm) high sat atop the original sides, decorated with pilasters. Like the walls of the sarcophagus, these consisted of two long, unbroken sections with smaller sections inserted between them at the ends. These sections were mortised, so that all four sections appear to meet at the corners. A slightly larger light grey granite base flared out above the pilaster section. Unlike the lower section, longer sections were sandwiched between the end sections. (This enables friction to help tie the monument together.) The new cover of the sarcophagus consisted of a single large light grey granite slab. Twenty-two bas-relief stars inside circles were added above the lip of the lid. Four stylized, partial fleur-de-lis faced outward at each corner. The top of the lid was rounded. The entire monument was about 12-foot (3.7 m) high at the uppermost portion of the lid.

The Civil War Unknowns Monument was the inspiration for Montgomery Meigs' own tomb, also located at Arlington National Cemetery. Meigs erected the sarcophagus over the grave of his wife, and he himself was buried there in 1892.

== Bibliography ==
- "Arlington National Cemetery." In Encyclopedia of the Veteran in America. William Pencak, ed. Santa Barbara, Calif.: ABC-CLIO, 2009.
- Atkinson, Rick. Where Valor Rests: Arlington National Cemetery. Washington, D.C.: National Geographic Society, 2007.
- Bigler, Philip. In Honored Glory: Arlington National Cemetery, the Final Post. St. Petersburg, Fla.: Vandamere Press, 2005.
- Chase, Enoch Aquila. "The Arlington Case: George Washington Custis Lee against the United States of America." Records of the Columbia Historical Society. 31/32: 1930.
- Cleaveland, George A. and Campbell, Robert E. American Landmarks: A Collection of Pictures of Our Country's Historic Shrines. Boston: Balch Bros., 1893.
- Cultural Landscape Program. Arlington House: The Robert E. Lee Memorial Cultural Landscape Report. National Capital Region. National Park Service. U.S. Department of the Interior. Washington, D.C.: 2001.
- Heidler, David Stephen; Heidler, Jeanne T.; and Coles, David J. Encyclopedia of the American Civil War: A Political, Social, and Military History. New York: Norton, 2002.
- McCaslin, Richard B. Lee in the Shadow of Washington. Baton Rouge: Louisiana State University Press, 2004.
- Peters, James Edward. Arlington National Cemetery, Shrine to America's Heroes. Bethesda, Md.: Woodbine House, 2000.
