= Rough Riders Memorial =

Memorial in Virginia, USA

- United States
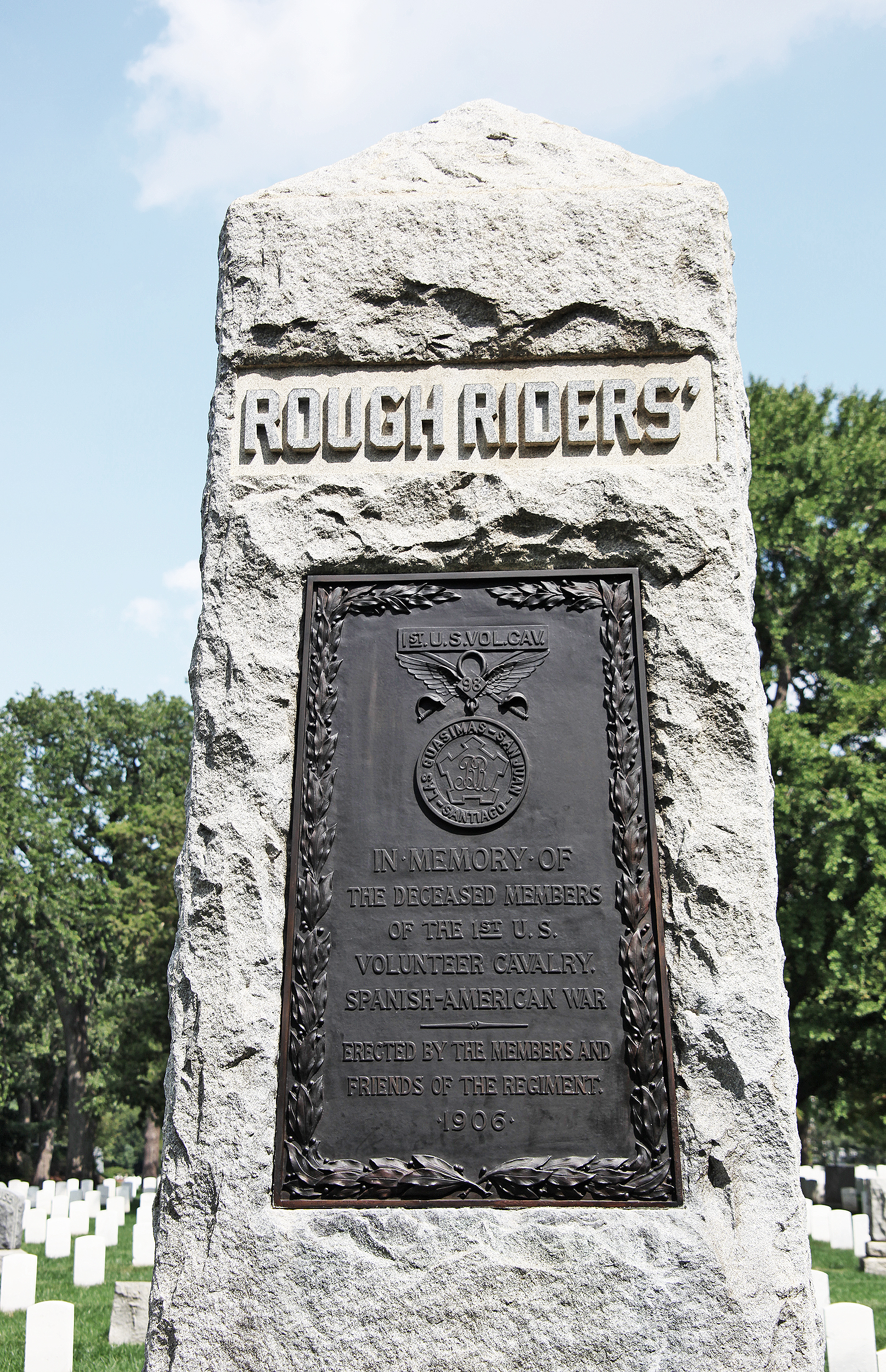
- Rough Riders Memorial in 2011
- For members of the Rough Riders who died in the Spanish–American War
- Unveiled: April 12, 1907; 119 years ago
- Location: 38.875429°N 77.075989°W near Arlington County, Virginia, U.S.

The Rough Riders Memorial is a memorial in Arlington National Cemetery residing in Arlington County, Virginia, United States of America. The memorial commemorates members of the "Rough Riders" who died in the Spanish–American War in 1898. The grey granite shaft was erected by surviving members of the Rough Riders and their friends and supporters. Although Arlington National Cemetery, a number of secondary sources, and even the bronze plaque on the memorial say the monument was dedicated in 1906 and one source says 1905, contemporary newspaper accounts show the memorial was dedicated on April 12, 1907.

== The Rough Riders ==
The Spanish–American War was a ten-week conflict during the spring and summer of 1898. Cuba had been waging a war of independence against Spain since 1895, an effort largely supported by the United States, which had extensive economic interests on the island. To ensure the safety of American citizens and property in Cuba, the United States sent the battleship USS Maine (ACR-1) to Havana in late January 1898. The Maine exploded and was destroyed with large loss of life on February 15, and Spain and the U.S. declared war on each other on April 25.

With only 25,000 men in the United States Army but more than 100,000 needed to prosecute the war, Assistant Secretary of the Navy Theodore Roosevelt convinced Secretary of War Russell A. Alger that he could raise an all-volunteer force of 1,000 men and form a cavalry regiment. Alger offered Roosevelt a commission in the Army as a full colonel in command of a regular regiment, but Roosevelt declined. Alger agreed to Roosevelt's volunteer scheme, and Roosevelt resigned his post on May 6, 1898. Roosevelt was commissioned a lieutenant colonel of volunteers and declined command of the regiment (due to his military inexperience) in favor of his friend, Colonel Leonard Wood. Although formally named the "1st United States Volunteer Cavalry", the press nicknamed the regiment the "Rough Riders" because most of the men were cowboys, frontiersmen, railroad workers, Native Americans, and similar "rough" people from the West.

The 1,060 Rough Riders departed their training camp in San Antonio, Texas, on May 29, and arrived in Santiago de Cuba, Cuba, on June 19. They participated in the Battle of Las Guasimas on June 24, during which they successfully turned the right flank of a retreating Spanish Army force with superior weapons and more men. On July 1, the regiment participated in the Battle of San Juan Hill, during which it successfully charged Kettle Hill (the famous "charge up San Juan Hill") and dislodged another Spanish force with superior firepower.

=== The first Rough Rider memorials ===
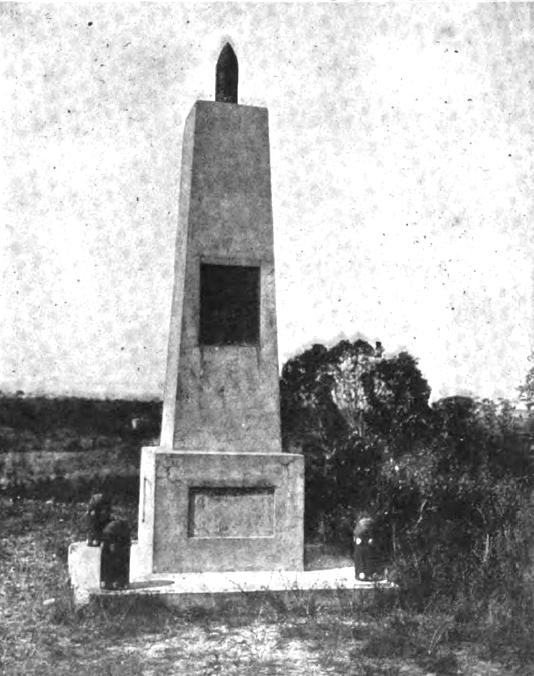
The memorial to the Rough Riders at San Juan Hill near the old Spanish Army blockhouse in 1910.

Two memorials to the Rough Riders were erected in Cuba shortly after the Spanish–American War ended. One, erected by Brigadier General Wood out of general funds provided for Cuba's military occupation, was erected next to the Spanish Army blockhouse atop San Juan Hill. This memorial stood on a square concrete base, on the four corners of which were placed artillery shells. A square plinth with sunk, blank panels on all four sides stood on the base. On the plinth rose a tapered square column with a flat top. Sunk into the face of this column was a bronze plaque, which read: "In memory of the officers and men of the United States army, who were killed in the assault and capture of this ridge, July 1, 1898, and in the siege of Santiago, July 1 to July 16, 1898. War between Spain and the United States."

A second memorial, specific to the Rough Riders, was erected at Las Guasimas. The provenance of this memorial is not clear. It was shaped much like the one at San Juan Hill although the building materials were much different. This monument was set on a flagstone base. Rough-hewn pieces of dark grey granite were cemented together to form a rectangular plinth (square in cross-section) atop the flagstones. A tapered square column, made of the same rough-hewn, cemented granite, rose to a flat top. An artillery shell was placed atop the column, and a bronze plaque affixed to its face. The plaque read: "In Memory / Of the men of /The First and Tenth United States Cavalry, / Young's Brigade / Wheeler's Division, / Who Were Killed in the / Battle of Las Guásimas / June 24th 1898."

== Creating the Rough Rider Memorial ==
It is not clear who first proposed a Rough Rider Memorial, or when the idea was first raised. A Rough Riders National Monument Society was organized on June 15, 1906. Lillian Capron, wife of Captain Allyn K. Capron Jr. (the Rough Riders' first officer to be killed in action), was elected president and treasurer. Eldridge E. Jordan, a prominent businessman, was elected vice president. The other members of the board of directors included Charles E. Hunter, an Oklahoma Republican politician and clerk of the Oklahoma Federal District Court; William Henry Harrison Llewellyn, a New Mexico Territory Republican politician and United States Attorney; Captain James R. Church, M.D., U.S. Army; and the Reverend Henry A. Brown, U.S. Army. All the men were former Rough Riders. Rev. Brown had served as the regimental chaplain.

The society also established a memorial committee. Its members included Capron, Jordan, and the rest of the society's board of directors. Additional members included Maude Wildrey Towne, wife of former Representative Charles A. Towne, and John Doyle Carmody, a prominent D.C. attorney.

It is unclear exactly when approval to erect the Rough Rider Memorial at Arlington National Cemetery was given. The U.S. Army Quartermaster Corps had control of Arlington National Cemetery at the time. The erection of a monument would have required the permission of either Brigadier General Charles F. Humphrey, Sr., the Quartermaster General, or Secretary of War William Howard Taft. But no record of such permission exists. Theodore Roosevelt was sworn in as President of the United States on September 14, 1901, after the death of President William McKinley. Taft was one of Roosevelt's closest friends. Approval was very unlikely to be denied, and was probably given some time in May or early June 1906. The first fundraiser for the memorial was announced June 10, 1906—five days before the society was formally organized.

The Rough Rider Memorial was designed by Mrs. Capron, who decided to model the monument on the Rough Riders shaft erected by General Wood in Cuba. The bronze tablet on the memorial's face was designed by Major J.T. Knight and Major S.L. Fairson, Army officers assigned to the Quartermaster General's office in Washington, D.C.

A fundraising campaign was undertaken to pay for the memorial. On June 10, 1906. Mrs. Capron had organized a party to raise money for a monument. During the event, a saber was raffled off, various donated items sold, and the United States Marine Band gave a two-hour concert. President Theodore Roosevelt donated a large number of American Beauty roses from the White House Rose Garden. Another fund-raiser was held on February 8, 1907, when members of the 13th Cavalry and the 4th Battery, U.S. Light Field Artillery, put on a display of horsemanship at Fort Myer, adjacent to Arlington National Cemetery. President Roosevelt and most of Washington society were expected to attend. The event drew a large crowd and raised a significant amount of money.

=== Construction ===
The Rough Riders Memorial was created from grey granite quarried in Barre, Vermont. The stone arrived at Arlington National Cemetery by February 6, 1907. The tablet included the Rough Riders insignia at the top and the plaque's tentative language read: "In memory of the deceased members of the First United States Volunteer Cavalry, Spanish–American War. Erected by the members and friends of the regiment."

The foundation for the memorial was laid on March 27, 1907. Present for this event were Mrs. Capron, Mrs. Towne, and Mr. Carmody. A time capsule in the form of a bronze box was placed beneath the monument. Included in the capsule were copies of each daily newspaper in Washington, D.C.; an American flag; and one of each American silver coin in circulation, and a copy of Theodore Roosevelt's book, The Rough Riders in Cuba, autographed by President Roosevelt, the Reverend Doctor Denis J. Stafford, rector of St. Patrick's Catholic Church of Washington, D.C., Presidential Secretary William Loeb Jr., and members of the memorial committee.

=== Dedication ===
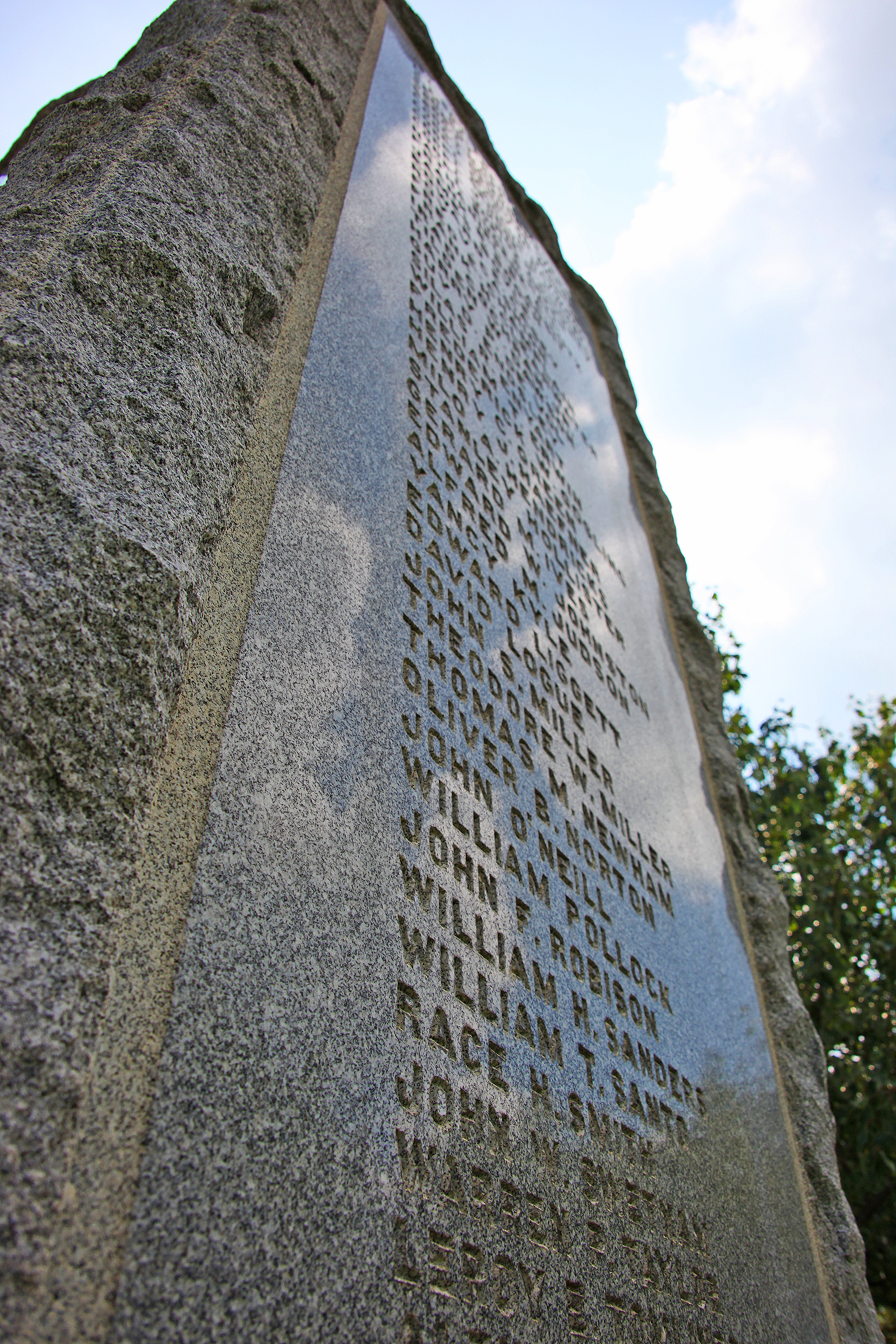
North panel of the memorial, showing names of the dead.

The unveiling and dedication ceremony for the Rough Riders Memorial was at 4:30 P.M. on April 12, 1907. The Rough Riders Monument Society formed a committee to plan the event, and Major General George H. Harries assisted with the planning and acted as master of ceremonies. In attendance were three batteries from the U.S. Light Field Artillery, a squad of mounted soldiers from the 13th Cavalry, three companies of the District of Columbia Army National Guard, and part of a company of the D.C. Naval National Guard. Music was provided by the 13th Cavalry Band; the Engineers' Band from the Washington Navy Yard; and the Brigade Band of the District of Columbia National Guard. At the time, seven Rough Riders were buried in the far western edge of what is now Section 22 (along McPherson Avenue). These graves were strewn with yellow and white flowers, the colors of the regiment.

A 21-gun salute by the artillery welcomed President Roosevelt, who was accompanied by Lieutenant General S. B. M. Young (the recently retired Chief of Staff of the United States Army) and Major General Frank McCoy (his military aide). Each band played a musical selection, and Rev. Henry A. Brown provided the invocation. The crowd sang Nearer, My God, to Thee and then Mrs. Capron unveiled the memorial as the bands played "The Star-Spangled Banner". President Roosevelt spoke at length about patriotism and duty, and then the Rev. Dr. Stafford provided an oration on virtue. After several more musical pieces by the bands, Rev. Brown gave the benediction. Taps was played by a bugler, and another 21-gun salute closed the ceremony.

Those attending included all Cabinet officers; Lieutenant General Adna Chaffee, the incumbent Army Chief of Staff; Secretary of the Navy Victor H. Metcalf; Major General George F. Elliott, Commandant of the Marine Corps; Rear Admiral William S. Cowles; Presidential secretary Loeb; Brigadier General J. Franklin Bell; Assistant Secretary of War Robert Shaw Oliver; Assistant Secretary of the Navy Truman Newberry; the Commissioners of the District of Columbia; and the commanding general of the D.C. National Guard. Many former Rough Riders were also present, as well as representatives of the Spanish War Veterans, Army and Navy Union, Grand Army of the Republic, Society of the Army of the Tennessee, Oldest Inhabitants of the District of Columbia, United Confederate Veterans, Daughters of the American Revolution, George Washington Memorial Association, Sons of the Revolution, Union Veteran Legion, Loyal Legion, and Washington National Monument Society. Foreign dignitaries present included Jean Jules Jusserand, French ambassador to the United States; Baron Rosen, Imperial Russian ambassador to the United States; ambassadors from Brazil, Denmark, Japan, Norway, Panama, Thailand, and the United Kingdom; and the military attachés from the Embassy of Germany and Embassy of Japan.

== About the memorial ==
The Rough Riders Memorial is constructed of a grey granite block 14 feet (4.3 m) tall and quarried near Barre, Vermont. In design, it is very similar to the Rough Rider monument erected at Las Guasimas in Cuba. The obelisk-like memorial is rough-hewn everywhere, except for the panels on the north, south, and east faces where the names of the dead are carved.

Near the top of the front (western face) of the memorial is a smooth bar of granite, on which the words "ROUGH RIDERS'" is carved in bas-relief. Below this is a rectangular dark bronze plaque whose edges are ornamented with laurel leaves (a symbol of victory). At the top of the plaque is a bar which bears the name of the regiment ("1st. U.S. Vol. Cav."). Below that are outspread wings, over which two sabres are crossed. Appearing to hang from the sabres is the regimental insignia. An "RR" (for Rough Riders") is inscribed on the insignia, and the name of the three major battles in which the unit fought (Las Guasimas, San Juan Hill, Santiago) ring the emblem.

The text on tablet reads:

In memory of
The deceased members
of the 1st U.S.
Volunteer Cavalry,
Spanish–American War
Erected by the members and
friends of the regiment.
1906.

At the time of its unveiling, the names of more than 100 men had been cut into it.

The total cost of the Rough Riders Memorial was $2,500 ($86,384 in 2025 dollars).

The Rough Rider Monument Society planned to have the names of members of the regiment inscribed on the monument as they died, and established a self-sustaining fund to pay for this. The raising of money for the inscription fund continued long after the memorial's dedication. The monument society owed more than $1,000 ($34,554 in 2025 dollars) for construction of the memorial. Another display of military horsemanship by the 13th Cavalry and 4th Field Artillery Battery occurred in December 1907. President Roosevelt donated $100 ($3,583 in 2025 dollars) at the event to help dissipate the debt. Another memorial fund-raiser, also attended by President Roosevelt, was held in April 1908.

At the funeral of General Leonard Wood in August 1927, the approximately 400 living Rough Riders gathered for an informal reunion at Arlington National Cemetery. For many, it was the first time they had seen the Rough Riders Memorial.

The memorial's bronze tablet and inscriptions were cleaned and conserved in the early 2000s by Gordon Ponsford, a restorer who also worked on the cemetery's McClellan Gate and Confederate Memorial.

=== Dedication date ===
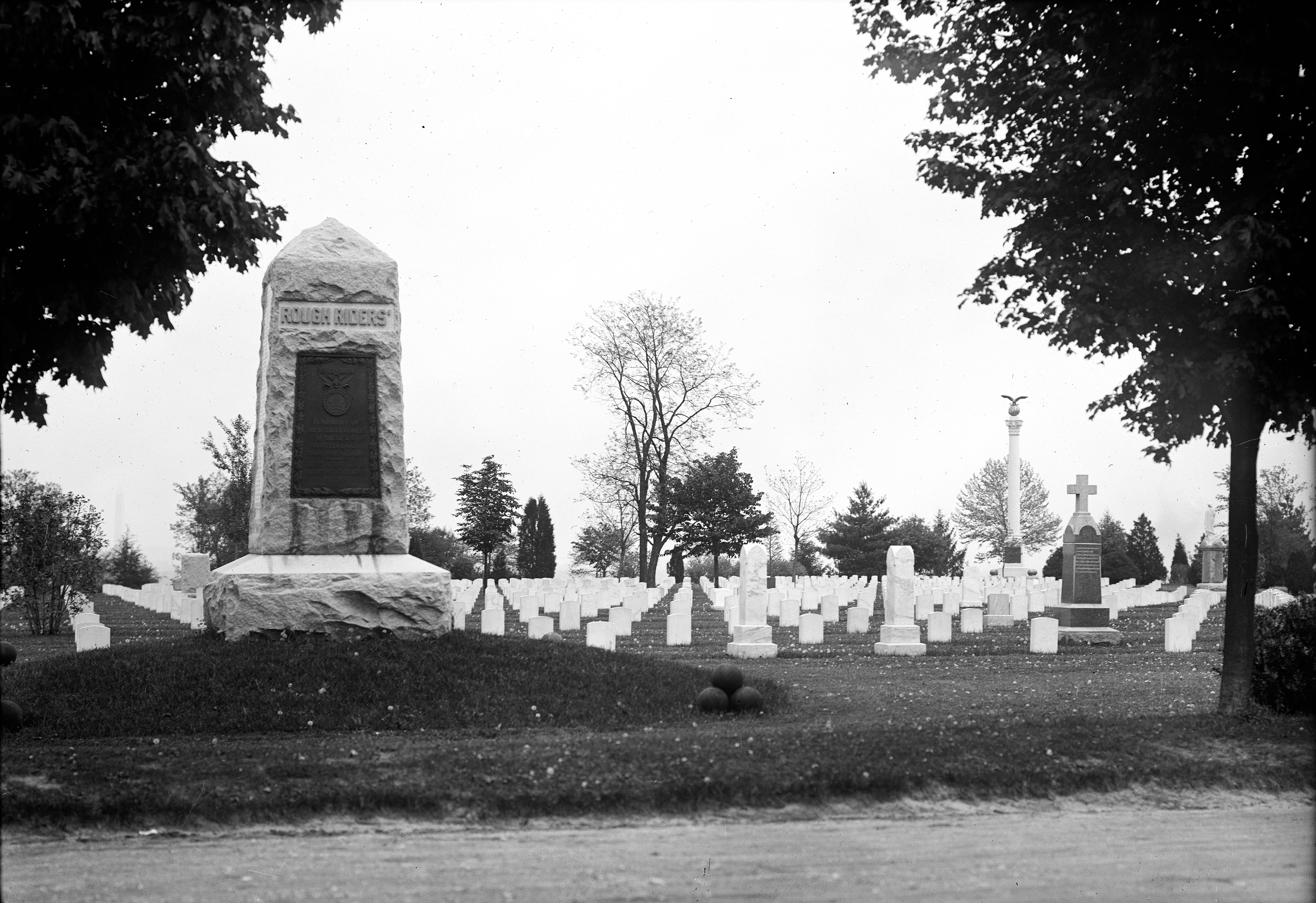
The Rough Riders Memorial in 1912.

Incorrect information about the date of the Rough Rider Memorial's dedication is common. This may be because the bronze plaque on the front of the memorial says 1906. Arlington National Cemetery and a number of secondary sources (largely written by historians of the cemetery) claim the monument was dedicated in 1906. One source even claims it was erected in 1905.

Contemporary newspaper accounts are clear that the memorial was dedicated on April 12, 1907. President Roosevelt's own published collection of major speeches notes that the date of dedication was April 12, 1907. Other historians note that the Rough Rider Memorial in Prescott, Arizona, was dedicated the same year (1907) as the Rough Riders Memorial at Arlington National Cemetery.

The Washington Post reported on March 28, 1907, that the memorial's bronze tablet said "1906".

== Bibliography ==
- Atkinson, Rick. Where Valor Rests: Arlington National Cemetery. Washington, D.C.: National Geographic Society, 2007.
- Andrews, Owen and Davidson, Cameron. A Moment of Silence: Arlington National Cemetery. Hoboken, N.J.: John Wiley & Sons, 1994.
- Davis, Richard Hardin. Moments in Hell: Notes of a War Correspondent. Reprint ed. New York: Anthem Press, 2007. (First ed. Charles Scribner's Sons, 1910.)
- Davis, Richard Harding. "The Passing of San Juan Hill." Scribner's Magazine. 38:2 (August 1905), 142–153.
- Dodge, George W. Arlington National Cemetery. Charleston, S.C.: Arcadia Publishing, 2006.
- Hendrickson, Kenneth Elton. The Spanish–American War. Westport, Conn.: Greenwood Press, 2003.
- Hutton, Paul Andrew. "TR Takes Charge." In Western Heritage: A Selection of Wrangler Award-Winning Articles. Paul Andrew Hutton, ed. Norman, Okla.: University of Oklahoma Press, 2011.
- Lansford, Tom. Theodore Roosevelt in Perspective. New York: Novinka Books, 2005.
- Peters, Edward James. Arlington National Cemetery: Shrine to America's Heroes. 2d ed. Bethesda, Md.: Woodbine House, 2000.
- Quesadas, Alejandro. Roosevelt's Rough Riders. Westminster, Md.: Osprey Publishing, 2013.
- Roosevelt, Theodore. The Rough Riders and Men of Action. Reprint ed. Whitefish, Mont.: Kessinger Publishing, 2005. (Third rev. and updated ed., originally published by G.P. Putnam's Sons, 1905.)
- Summers, J.C. "A Cruise in Southern Seas." The Metropolitan Magazine. 24:4 (July 1906), 436–443.
- Trask, David F. The War With Spain in 1898. Lincoln, Neb.: University of Nebraska Press, 1996.
