= Chesapeake =

Chesapeake most often refers to:

- Chesapeake people, a Native American tribe also known as the Chesepian
- Chesapeake Bay
- Delmarva Peninsula, also known as the Chesapeake Peninsula

Chesapeake may also refer to:

== Populated places ==
=== In Virginia ===
- Chesapeake, Virginia, an independent city
- Phoebus, Virginia, formerly known as Chesapeake City
- Chesapeake, Northampton County, Virginia, an unincorporated community

=== In other US states ===
- Chesapeake, Indiana, defunct
- Chesapeake, Missouri
- Chesapeake, Ohio
- Chesapeake, West Virginia

== Schools ==
- Chesapeake High School, Anne Arundel County, Maryland
- Chesapeake High School, Baltimore, Maryland
- Chesapeake College, public community college based in Wye Mills, Maryland

== Ships ==
- SS Chesapeake, a transport oiler that was in service with the United States Navy from 2000 to 2009
- United States lightship Chesapeake (LV-116), a lightvessel
- USS Chesapeake (1799), an American frigate captured by HMS Shannon in 1813
- USS Patapsco (1799), a sloop originally named USS Chesapeake but renamed in 1799 while still under construction
- USS Chesapeake (1898), a training ship renamed USS Severn on 15 June 1905
- USS Chesapeake (ID-3395), a freighter
- USS Chesapeake (AOT-5084)
- HMS Chesapeake (1855), a Royal Navy frigate
- Porcher (1799 ship), originally a British ship named Chesapeake while owned by an American trading house at Canton

== Music, entertainment, and books ==
- Chesapeake (band), a folk-rock/progressive bluegrass band from Maryland
- Chesapeake (novel), a novel published in 1978 by James Michener
- Chesapeake (album), the third full-length album by Rachael Yamagata
- Chesapeake Shores, Canadian/American television drama
- Chesapeake Shores, novel series written by Sherryl Woods

== Transportation ==
- Chesapeake (train), an Amtrak commuter service between Philadelphia and Washington, D.C.
- Chesapeake (train, 1994–1995), an Amtrak service between New York City and Richmond, Virginia
- Chesapeake and Ohio Railway, a former American railroad, operating from 1869 to 1972 in the state of Virginia
- Chesapeake and Ohio Canal
- Chesapeake Bay Bridge, also known as the Bay Bridge, a bridge crossing the Chesapeake Bay
- Chesapeake Bay Bridge–Tunnel, bridge-tunnel crossing the mouth of the Chesapeake Bay
- Chesapeake 1000, a crane ship
- Vought Chesapeake, a British name for the Vought SB2U Vindicator

== Other ==
- Chesapeake Bay Retriever, a breed of dog
- Chesapeake Corporation, a historical holding company associated with Van Sweringen railroad holdings
- Chesapeake Group, a geologic group present in the United States
- Chesapeake Utilities, an American energy services company focusing on distribution of natural gas and propane
- Chesapeake Mill, in Wickham, Hampshire, England, a building constructed from the timbers of the USS Chesapeake
- Expand Energy, an American natural gas exploration company formerly known as Chesapeake Energy
- Paycom Center, a multi-purpose arena in downtown Oklahoma City formerly known as Chesapeake Energy Arena
- The Vought Chesapeake, British name for the United States built dive bomber, the Vought SB2U Vindicator
- Hemoglobin Chesapeake, a special form of hemoglobin that causes polycythemia

== See also ==
- Battle of the Chesapeake, a naval battle in 1781 between a British fleet and a combined French-American fleet
