= USS Maine Mast Memorial =

Monument in Arlington National Cemetery, Virginia

- United States
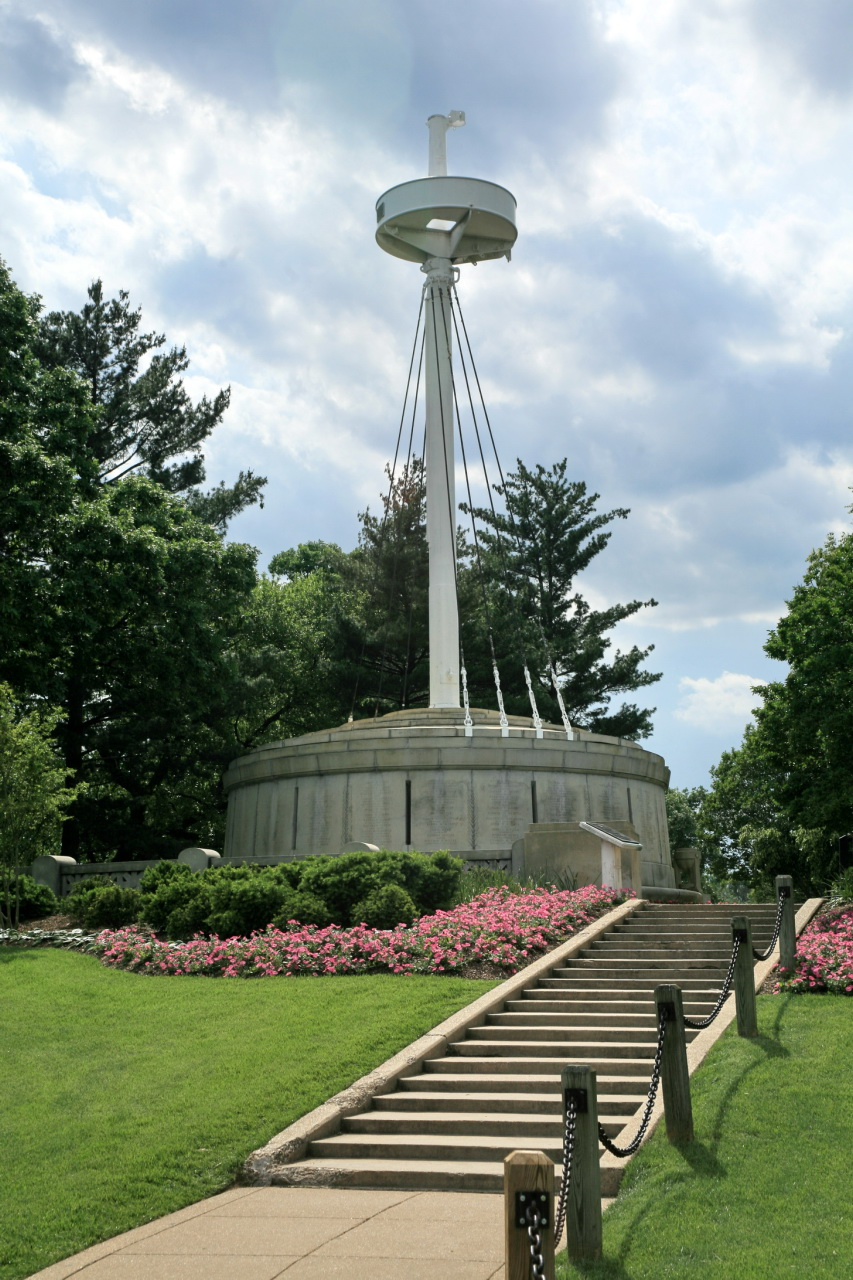
- USS Maine Mast Memorial in 2008
- For the dead of the USS Maine (ACR-1)
- Unveiled: May 30, 1915; 111 years ago
- Location: 38.876505°N 77.074735°W near Arlington County, Virginia, U.S.

The USS Maine Mast Memorial is a memorial honoring those who died aboard the USS Maine (ACR-1) on February 15, 1898, after a mysterious explosion destroyed the ship while at anchor in Havana Harbor. It is located in Arlington National Cemetery in Arlington County, Virginia, in the United States. The memorial consists of the main mast of the battleship set atop a circular concrete burial receiving vault designed to resemble a battleship turret. The memorial has occasionally been used to hold the remains of important individuals, such as Lord Lothian and Ignacy Jan Paderewski.

== The Maine disaster ==
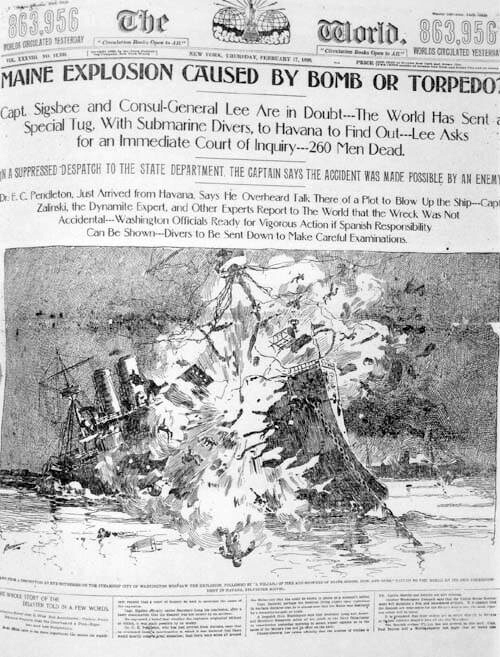
Front page of the New York World newspaper displaying a graphic depicting the destruction of the USS Maine

The USS Maine was one of several new battleships and other warships built by the United States Navy after 1884 to modernize the fleet. The Maine was launched on November 18, 1889, and commissioned on September 17, 1895. She was part of the North Atlantic Squadron for nearly all of her career.

On January 25, 1898, the Maine was sent from Key West, Florida, to Havana, Cuba, to protect American citizens and interests during the Cuban War of Independence. At 9:40 p.m. local time on February 15, an explosion on board Maine destroyed and sank the ship. More than 5 short tons (4.5 t) of powder charges in the ship's ammunitions magazine detonated, instantly destroying about 100 feet (30 m) (or one-third) of the bow of the ship. The central third of the ship remained somewhat more intact, but was severely damaged and lacked structural integrity. The last third of the ship at the stern remained completely intact. The burning Maine rapidly sank. Most of the Maine's crew (none of them officers) were sleeping or resting in the enlisted quarters in the forward part of the ship. Eight others died later from their injuries. Captain Charles Dwight Sigsbee and all but two of the officers survived.

Official figures for crew and dead are difficult to determine, and even government sources disagree. The majority of sources say the ship carried 354 crew. But crew numbers cited by sources include 327, 328, 350, 355, 358, 374, and 375.

The number of dead is also difficult to determine. Sources claim 252, 260, 262, 264, 266, and 274 dead. The number of dead is complicated by the fact that several members of the crew died after the initial explosion. But even these figures vary. Some sources say just 6 later died of their injuries, while others claim 8 did so.

On March 19, a U.S. Navy board of inquiry led by Captain William T. Sampson concluded that Maine was destroyed by the explosion of its ammunition magazines. But the board of inquiry were unable to determine what set off the ammunition. Nonetheless, the press and most members of Congress concluded that the Maine had struck a naval mine laid by the Spanish. Resolutions declaring war on Spain were introduced in Congress on March 28 and passed on April 20, initiating the Spanish–American War. (Subsequent investigations have suggested that the cause of the explosion was the ignition of coal dust in the fuel bunker or a fire in the coal bunker, although some have also concluded that the cause was a mine.)

=== Recovery and interment of bodies at Colon Cemetery ===
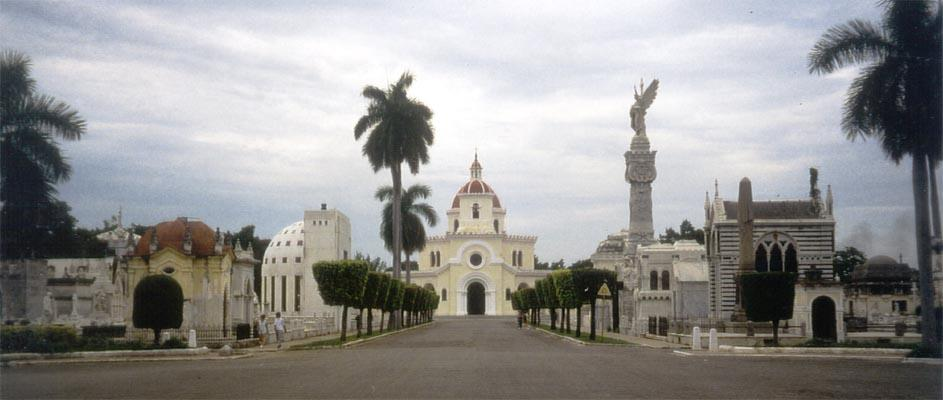
Colon Cemetery (seen here in 1998), where many of the dead of the Maine were buried in 1898

The days following the Maine disaster were chaotic. Some of the twisted wreckage of the center section and bow jutted high out of the water. At low tide, the decks of the center section of the ship were just under water, while the stern (which angled upward) was slightly out of the water. At high tide, all of the ship except the bow wreckage, the main mast, and the aft-mast was under water. The site of the disaster was quickly but not immediately secured by the Spanish Navy and Cuban colonial government. Souvenir seekers and the well-meaning nonetheless often accessed the wreck. Divers, most of them Cubans, were employed by the United States to bring bodies to the surface. Pieces of the ship lay some distance from the wreck, and some items washed ashore days or even weeks later.

Press reports about the dead were often confused. For example, the Washington Post reported that the body of engineer Darwin Merritt had been found on February 16, but this was incorrect. The newspaper also incorrectly reported that the body of Lieutenant Friend W. Jenkins was recovered on February 16. In fact, Jenkins' body was retrieved from an area near the aft torpedo tube on March 24. It was sent home to his family in Pittsburgh, Pennsylvania. The newspapers often got names wrong, reporting that an Edison or Tennis was among the dead (when no persons with those first or last names were among the crew).

The recovery of bodies was slow. Spanish law required that, in order to avoid the spread of disease, bodies be buried within 24 hours and remain buried for at least five years. Three bodies were caught in the wreckage at the surface. But no one noticed them until February 23 (a full week after the explosion), and by then vultures had devoured much of the corpses. Although only 19 corpses had been found, the city of Havana held a funeral for the dead. Thousands of people turned out for the funeral cortege and watched as the Spanish military bore the 19 elaborate coffins with great ceremony through the streets to Colon Cemetery, Havana. Another 135 bodies were recovered on February 19. The New York Times reported that this included the limbs of about 10 men. Twenty-four of them were identifiable. Two of the eight wounded (including Coxswain Alfred J. Holland) died that day as well.

Five more bodies were recovered on February 20, and Ordinary Seaman Frank Fisher died that day of his wounds. Several more bodies were recovered on February 21. Divers discovered another 20 bodies trapped below the forward hatch of the center section on February 23, but only three were brought to the surface as wreckage prevented the rest from being immediately retrieved. Two more of the wounded died that day as well. Another 12 bodies were recovered from near the engine rooms on February 22, all of them dismembered and badly disfigured. Work to free the bodies below the forward hatch continued on February 22, and was largely successful the following day. All but one was brought to the surface, and that body was too tightly caught in the wreckage to free. Another body rose of its own accord to the surface, and divers reported seeing several bodies trapped in twisted metal or in places where divers could not reach.

By March 4, a total of 161 bodies had been buried at Colon. The body of one of the Maine's four Japanese mess attendants and another sailor were pulled from the wreck on March 24, and another six bodies (including that of the muscular Coal Passer John Ziegler) brought to the surface the following day.

Work on the wreck of the Maine stopped on April 3, 1898. All divers and tugs were withdrawn from the site, and the recovery of bodies called off. U.S. naval authorities estimated that 75 or 76 bodies still remained undiscovered below.

=== Key West burials ===
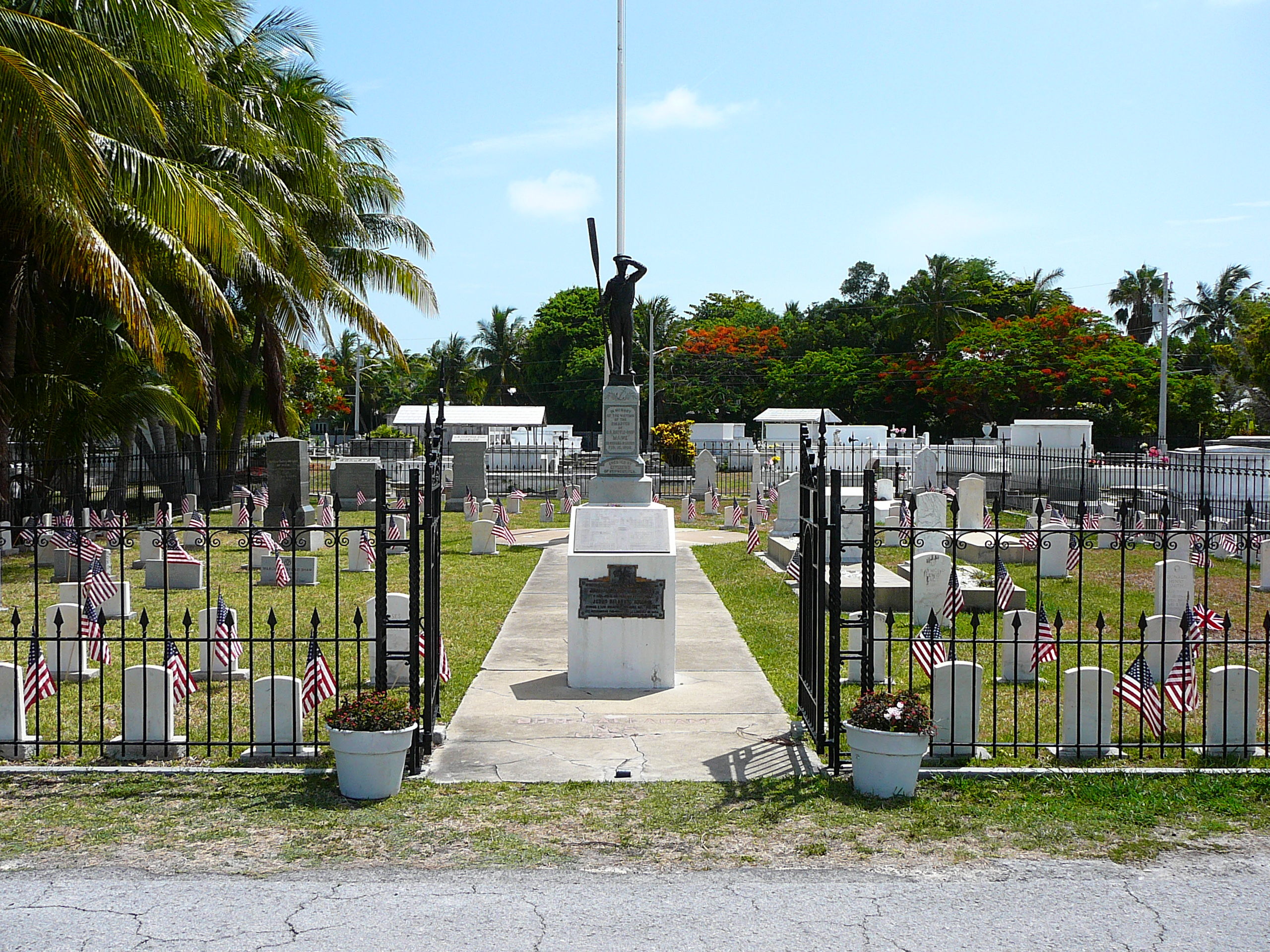
Maine dead burial plot in City Cemetery, Key West, Florida

Some bodies in Havana were not recovered until the end of February. For reasons which remain unclear, the U.S. Navy transported these remains to Key West, Florida, where they were buried. The first burials, of an unreported number of bodies, were made there on March 1 at City Cemetery. The funeral was organized by Captain Bowman H. McCalla of the USS Marblehead (C-11). Small detachments of Marines from nearby vessels and from Fort Jefferson in the nearby Dry Tortugas provided an honor guard and guided the caissons on which the coffins were borne. Guns from the ships fired after the funeral ended. Six more bodies (including two in a single coffin) arrived on March 8, and were buried in City Cemetery as well. Another two unidentified bodies were brought to Key West by the cruiser Olivette on March 17, and buried on March 18.

The arrival of bodies at multiple times at Key West has led to confusion over how many bodies from the Maine are buried there. The New York Times did not report the number of dead at Key West, but said only two had been identified. In 1912, the Army Quartermaster Corps reported that there were just 19 bodies at Key West. But other published sources vary quite widely. The National Geographic Society reported 22 bodies in 2012. A number of sources cite 24 bodies. In May 1898, the Washington Post reported 24 bodies buried at Key West. It said two were identified, an African American and a Japanese mess attendant. In 1997, the Associated Press also that 24 bodies were buried at Key West, of whom seven were identified. In 2009, the Key News newspaper also reported 24 bodies at Key West, including that of Coal Passer John Ziegler. A wide range of other sources have also cited 24 bodies at Key West. Some sources say 25 bodies are buried there, others 26, and several others 27.

== 1899 reburials at Arlington National Cemetery ==
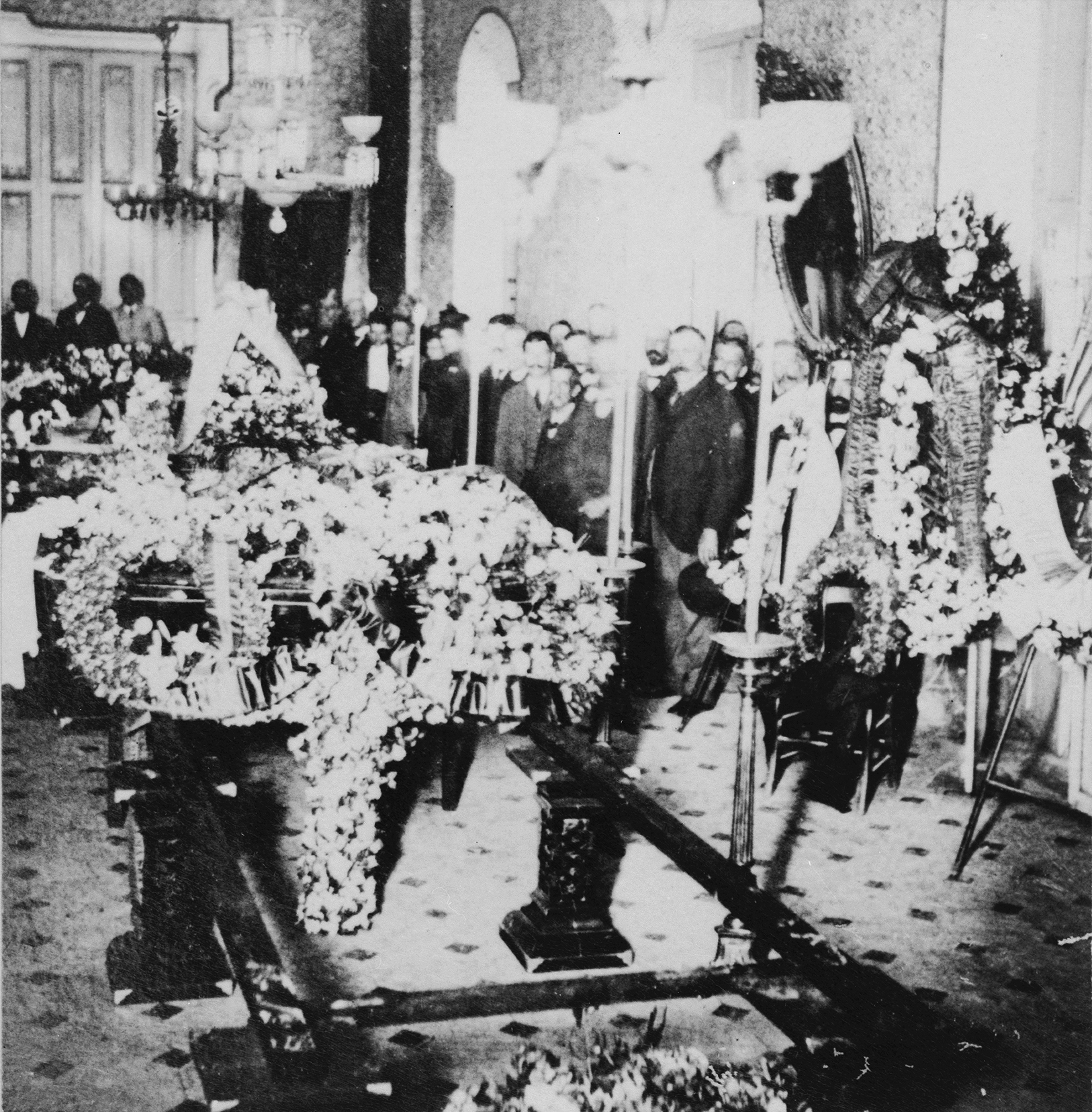
Dead of the Maine lying in state in City Hall in Havana, Cuba, about February 17, 1898

The press reported that there were 147 graves at Colon Cemetery, although since there were believed to be 166 bodies it was also assumed that some coffins contained more than one body. In October 1899, Representative Charles A. Boutelle sponsored successful legislation that appropriated $10,000 to have the U.S. Navy repatriate the bodies buried at Colon Cemetery. Boutelle wanted them reinterred at Arlington National Cemetery near the field where the dead of the Siege of Santiago were buried. With the Spanish–American War over, Spanish law no longer barred disinterment in Cuba. By mid-November, as plans for the disinterment proceeded, the Washington Post reported that reburial at Arlington was not yet official.

On November 27, President William McKinley ordered the USS Texas to proceed to Havana and bring the dead home. The Texas would return to Hampton Roads, Virginia, where they would be transferred to a special train of the Chesapeake and Ohio Railway (the C&O) for their trip to Rosslyn, Virginia. At Rosslyn, caissons and an honor guard would bring the bodies the short distance to the cemetery, where the coffins would be placed under tents prior to burial. McKinley also made Arlington National Cemetery the official resting place for the dead. The Texas was anticipated to arrive back in the United States on December 15. But the ship didn't even depart until December 13, and arrived in Havana on December 17.

Disinterment of the dead at Colon Cemetery by U.S. naval personnel began on December 17, 1899. There was little ceremony as the wood coffins were brought to the surface. Each grave held from one to 20 caskets. Each body had been packed in lime (believed to encourage rapid decomposition of flesh). In some cases, the lime had hardened into a solid cake, requiring the workers to break the body free (which distressed some of the workers). The remains were transferred to tin-lined wood coffins, where they were placed on a bed of lime and charcoal, with more of each substance packed around them before the coffin was sealed.

Errors in the original body and coffins counts quickly became apparent. Father John P. Chidwick, the Roman Catholic chaplain aboard the Maine at the time of its destruction, had overseen the original interments in February and March 1898. He now also oversaw the disinterment. Chidwick's records showed that there should have been 154 coffins, but only 151 were recovered. Additionally, Chidwick's list of the dead showed two unidentified bodies were unaccounted for. Several reasons for the discrepancies were offered: Clerical errors, errors made by the overburdened Chidwick, and more than one body in the same casket. Chidwick, Colon Cemetery officials, and Cuban authorities were convinced, however, that no bodies had been lost. Disinterment also revealed a new problem: At the time of burial, identified remains had a number painted on the exterior of the coffin that corresponded with a name on Chidwick's list of dead. But by the time of disinterment, the numbers on many of these coffins were unreadable. Identified remains thus became unidentified. Another problem was the way the dead were buried. As bodies were buried at Colon Cemetery, the row and grave number was supposed to be noted for each casket. Unfortunately, the cemetery superintendent only noted which row each identified body was in—not the actual grave number. This, too, made it sometimes impossible to determine in which grave identified remains laid. Some casket numbers were readable, however. Those bodies which still could be identified had their names painted on the exterior of the new coffin. The old coffins were burned.

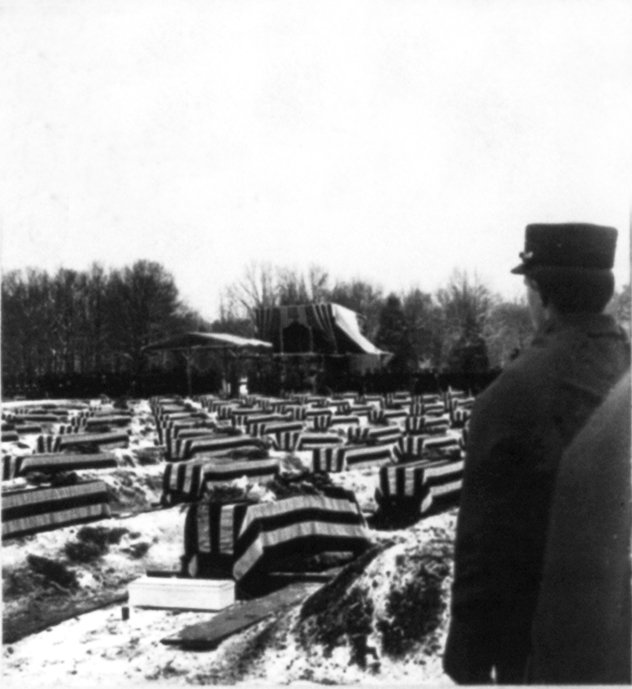
Presidential dais and coffins of the Maine dead at Arlington National Cemetery on December 28, 1899

Disinterment ended at 10:00 p.m. local time. The 151 coffins were taken to Machina Wharf and held under guard overnight. Early the next morning, the coffins were placed about two small steamships, which took the dead at 6:00 a.m. to the Texas. The coffins were arranged on the Texas's afterdeck in groups and covered in canvas. Many American flags and wreaths evergreens and artificial flowers were placed on the canvas coverings, and the coffins guarded by U.S. Marines day and night until the ship reached Hampton Roads.

The Texas arrived at Hampton Roads at 11:00 a.m. local time on December 25, 1899. The 151 coffins were offloaded by U.S. Navy personnel and transferred to funeral barges. Bluejackets accompanied each funeral barge until it reached the railroad pier. The bluejackets transferred the coffins from the barges to the waiting train while a Marine honor guard stood watch. A unit of six bluejackets and six Marines provided an honor guard aboard the train. Jeremiah Shea, fireman who was aboard the Maine on its fateful night, was one of the six sailors. Accompanying the sailors and marines were Father Chidwick and a lieutenant from the Texas. The funeral train consisted of four baggage cars and a vestibule car with the seats removed. Transferral of the dead from the Texas to the wharf took much longer than anticipated, although only an hour was needed to load the funeral train. Due to the delays, the train did not depart Hampton Roads until 10:00 p.m. local time on December 26. Expected to arrive at 8:00 a.m. on December 27, it did not do so until 11:00 a.m. Captain Sigsbee did not take the funeral train to Washington, but rather rode a steamboat up the Potomac River to reach the city faster.

The funeral train reached Rosslyn, Virginia, on December 27. The remains were transferred to wagons, and taken to Arlington National Cemetery. The funeral cortege include a cavalry unit from Fort Myer, a unit of 25 marines from the Washington Navy Yard, and a unit of bluejackets (U.S. Navy sailors) from the USS Texas. The coffins were carried through the Sheridan Gate placed under tents and an honor guard of Marines protected them overnight.

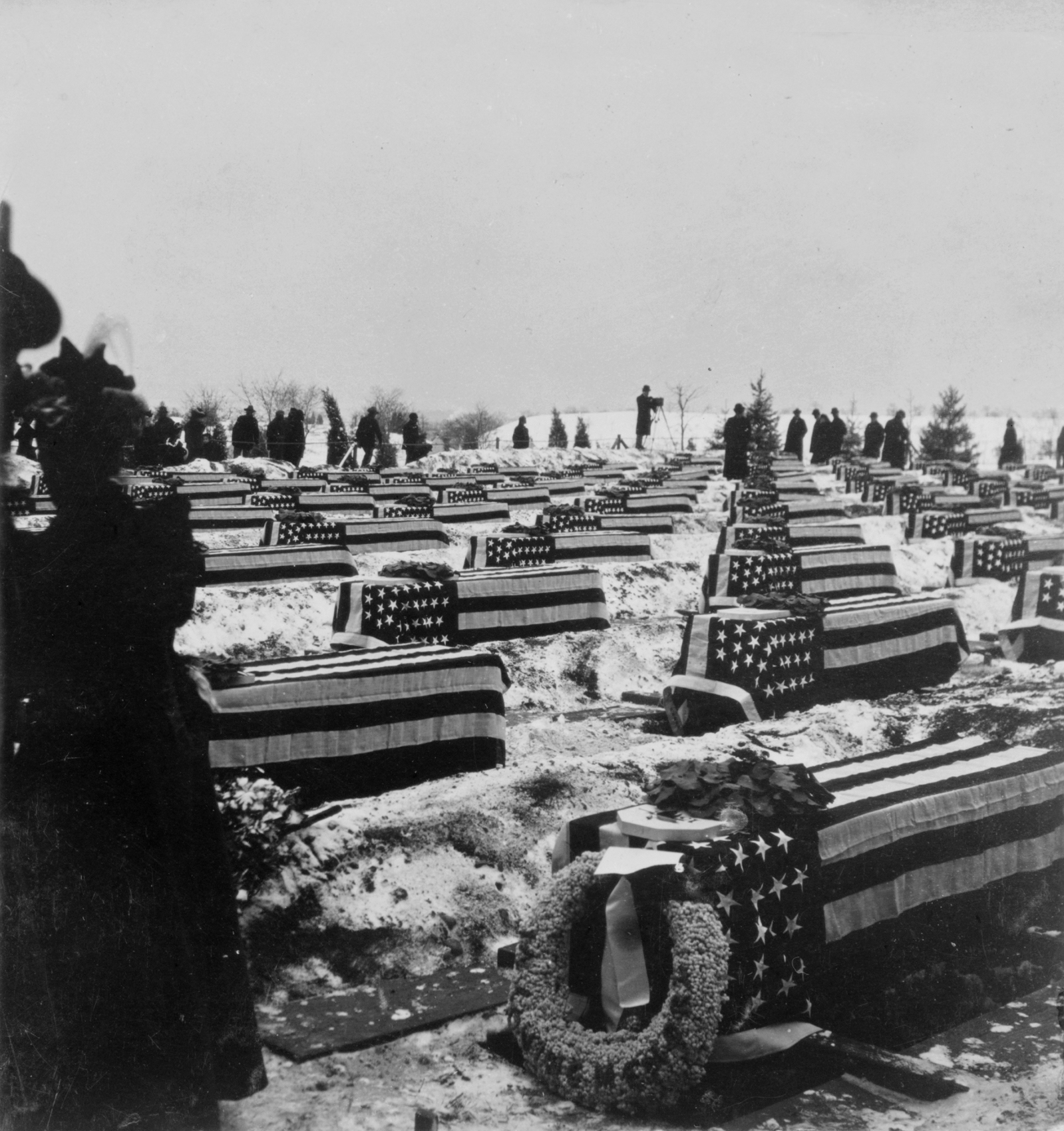
Galax leaf wreaths decorate the coffins containing the dead of the Maine on December 28, 1899

A grassy knoll at Arlington National Cemetery adjacent to the burial field containing the dead of the Santiago campaign was chosen by Assistant Secretary of the Navy Charles Herbert Allen for the reinterment. The remains of 166 dead were contained in the 151 caskets (as only partial remains were found in many cases). Either 10, 22 or 30 families (sources differ) asked that the remains of their loved ones be returned for private burial. But few remains were identifiable (among them the remains of Frederick C. Holzer). It is unclear just how many of the remains were identifiable, as some sources say only 10 and others say 24. Although these families were initially promised that they could take their dead home and bury them privately, the War Department reluctantly decided not to do so. All identifiable remains received a headstone with a name on it, while all other remains were marked "Unknown". (Some sources claim that 191 bodies or portions of bodies were recovered, and 73 of these were identifiable. By this calculation, 166 were buried at Arlington National Cemetery on December 28, 1899, and 25 remained at Key West.)

A wreath of galax leaves was provided for each casket, which was also draped with an American flag. Each coffin was placed next to an open grave. Once the funeral cortege departed, two companies of bluejackets and a battalion of U.S. Marines acted as honor guards for the dead. They were joined by the United States Marine Corps Band. Captain Sigsbee was in command of the three honor guards. A small dais draped in red, white, and blue was provided for the speakers and officiators. President McKinley, his Cabinet, Admiral George Dewey, Lieutenant General Nelson A. Miles, Lieutenant Commander Richard Wainwright (former Executive Officer of the Maine), Lieutenant Frederic C. Bowers (former Passed Assistant Engineer aboard the Maine), and Coal Passer Jeremiah Shea attended the ceremony.

The funeral was largely the same as that used for burying the Santiago campaign's dead. Protestant funeral rites were read first by Chaplain H.H. Clarke, followed by Catholic rites said by Father Chidwick. The sailors fired a 21-gun salute, the Marine Corps Band played a funeral dirge, taps were played by a bugler, and the reinterment ceremony ended. More than 25,000 people watched the burial. Crowds of mourners passed by the coffins during the rest of the day, laying flowers and tributes. It was not until early evening that the coffins were placed in the graves and buried.

The War Department had promised the family of Frederick C. Holzer (one of the crewmen who died days after the explosion) that they could have Holzer's body. His body turned over to his family and reburied in his home town on Indianapolis, Indiana. Sources vary as to whether his body was never buried at Arlington, or was disinterred at some later date and turned over to the family.

== The first memorial ==
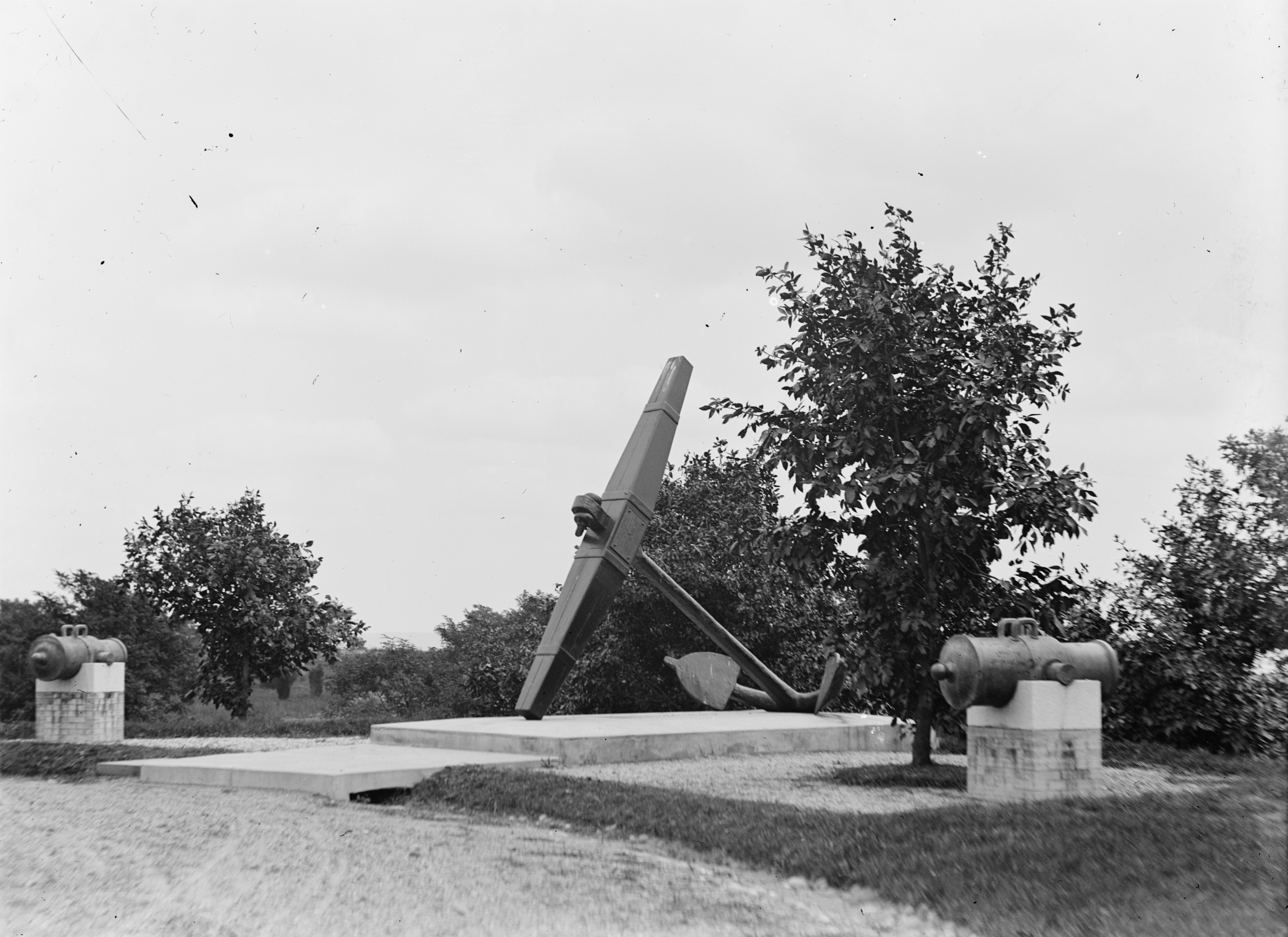
First USS Maine Memorial in Arlington National Cemetery prior to 1915

There were many attempts to create a national USS Maine memorial in the wake of the disaster. Citizens in Washington, D.C., began collecting voluntary contributions from members of Congress and wealthy people in society to erect a memorial shaft as early as February 24, 1898. But nothing came of the effort. Senator Augustus Octavius Bacon sponsored legislation to place a bronze memorial tablet in the United States Capitol shortly thereafter. Although this resolution passed the Senate, no further action was taken. Senator Eugene Hale sponsored legislation to have a granite memorial raised in Colon Cemetery in February 1899, but this effort, too, failed. An effort was also made in Congress to make the date of the Maine's destruction a national holiday. On March 15, 1900, the city of Key West dedicated a statue and memorial to the dead of the Maine. This memorial was placed in the "Maine plot" in the City Cemetery where the Maine dead were buried.

The first memorial to the Maine dead was constructed in the first six months of 1900. Near the field of the Maine dead a concrete base was poured. Two Spanish mortars – taken by Admiral George Dewey from Cavite Arsenal in Manila, The Philippines, at the end of the Spanish–American War—were placed on brick piers on either side of this base.

In the center of the concrete pad was an anchor. The anchor was manufactured specifically for the site. The 2-short-ton (1.8-long-ton) anchor was hand-welded using rough iron to give it a unique look. A slightly worm-eaten wooden crossbar was inserted into the top of the anchor. The crossbar was painted black to protect it, and a brass tablet was riveted to the crossbar. On the tablet was written:

U. S. S. MAINE

Blown Up February Fifteenth, 1898.
Here Lie the Remains of One-Hundred Sixty-three Men of
'The Maine's' Crew Brought From Havana, Cuba.
Reinterred at Arlington, December Twenty-eight, 1899.

The Maine memorial mimicked a similar memorial of four captured guns erected previously that year in the Santiago campaign burial field. (These guns formed the basis for the Spanish–American War Memorial, erected in 1902.)

== 1912 reburials at Arlington National Cemetery ==
The Maine lay at the bottom of Havana Harbor for many years. The wreck was a hazard to ships, occupied valuable anchorage space, and a dangerous shoal was building up around it. Additionally, some politicians in Cuba and Spain were suggesting that the reason the United States did not remove the wreck is that it would reveal the "struck by a mine" theory to be incorrect.

=== Attempts to raise the Maine ===
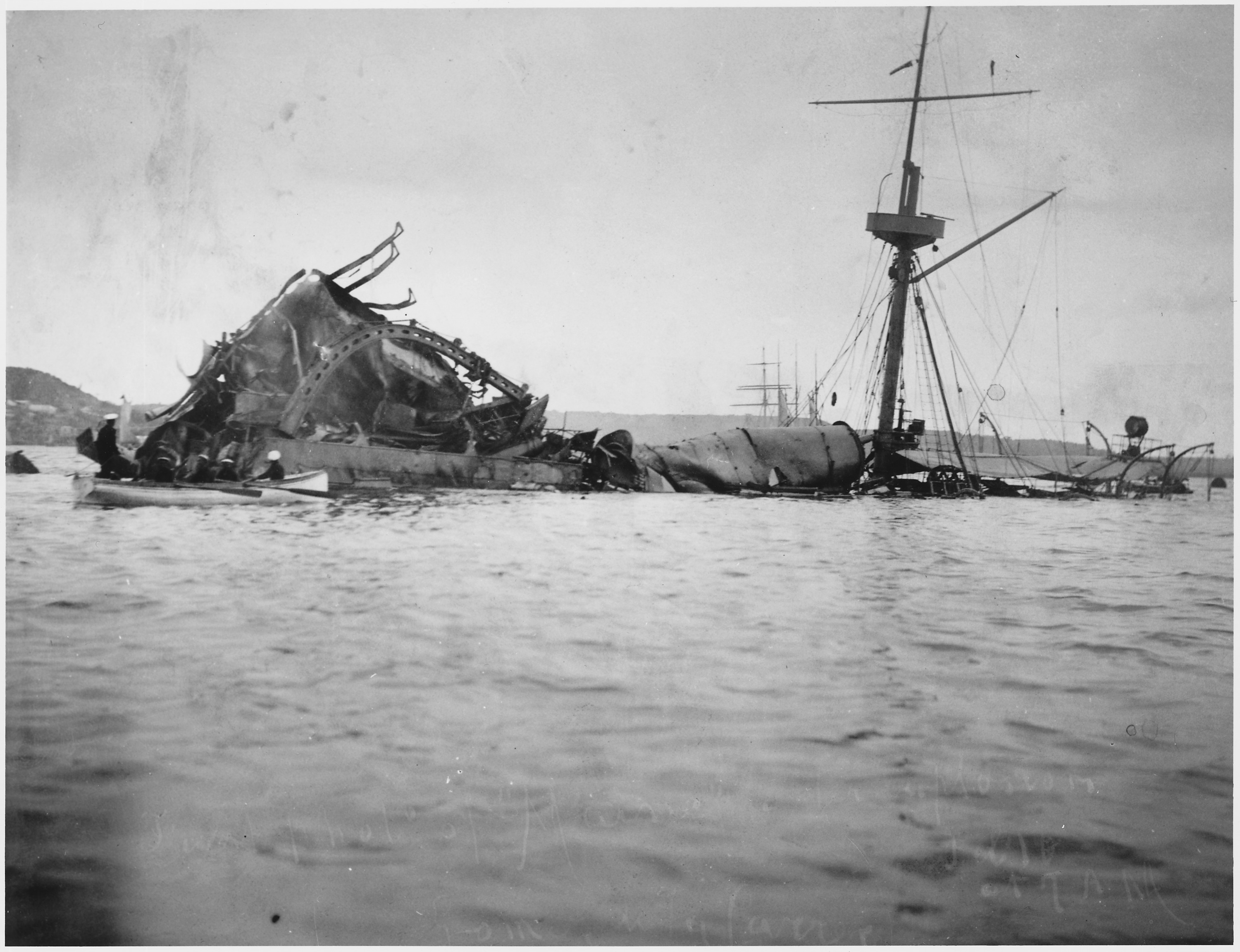
Wreckage of the USS Maine in Havana Harbor in 1910. Note the main mast standing nearly upright.

Lieutenant General Leonard Wood, Military Governor of Cuba, asked for the wreck of the Maine to be removed in October 1900. Secretary of the Navy John Davis Long approved the plan. A call for proposals was made on November 19, and five bids were received. Chamberlain & Co., of Chicago, Illinois, agreed to remove the wreck using balloons, hydraulic jacks, and compressed air for nothing in return for 97 percent of the profits on all sales of relics from the wreck (the government would receive the remainder). After an on-site inspection, Chamberlain claimed the ship was in one piece. But by April, when the time period for work to begin expired, no construction bond had been posted and no work was done. Chamberlain & Co. defaulted on their contract in July.

A second effort by the United States to raise the Maine was proposed in 1902. General Wood reiterated the call for removal of the Maine in March 1902. Senator William E. Mason proposed legislation in May 1902 to raise the ship to determine the true reason for its destruction. Mason's bill provided just $50,000 for the project, but that amount proved far too low. Senator Henry Cabot Lodge introduced a bill the same month providing $1 million to raise the Maine and repatriate any remains found to the United States. But no action was taken on either bill, even though there were published reports in November 1902 that the Cuban guard on the ship had been removed and relic hunters had stripped all the copper from the wreck.

Spain, too, wanted the wreck removed, and proposed in March 1903 that their government raise the Maine, but Cuba declined to give permission. Instead, Cuba—desiring to maintain good relations with the U.S. as well as Spain—itself said it would remove the wreck. Few American firms bid on the work, as the use of dynamite on the wreck was prohibited. After an initial round of bids were rejected, a contract was signed in June 1904 with both Joseph de Wyckoff (an American industrialist) and the firm R.H.F. Sewell of New Orleans, Louisiana. Because the Cuban government was worried that a mine would be found to be the cause of the wreck, its contract with the salvage firms required the wreck to be towed out to sea and sunk. The Sewell firm asked the U.S. government if it retained any legal interest in the wreck. Not only did de Wyckoff protest the Sewell firm's involvement, but the United States informed all concerned in July 1904 that it retained ownership of the Maine and would vigorously prosecute anyone interfering with the wreck. The Cuban effort was quietly canceled.

=== New momentum for a Maine memorial ===
After the failed Cuban attempt to raise the Maine, an important suggestion was made regarding a potential memorial. The Boston Seaman's Friend Society, an association of merchant mariners and their supporters, proposed retrieving the ship's main mast and erecting it as a memorial in Arlington National Cemetery.

In 1908, on the tenth anniversary of the disaster, Representative Charles August Sulzer introduced legislation requesting the raising of the USS Maine and the burial of any dead which remained aboard her. Secretary of the Navy Victor H. Metcalf proposed amending the bill to ensure that the Cuban government was involved in the process and approved of it. No action was taken on the bill during the first session of the 60th Congress.

In January 1909, Charles E. Magoon, Governor of Cuba, again asked for the removal of the wreck of the Maine. The day after Magoon's request, a group of Maine survivors and their families formed the Maine Memorial Association (also known as the Maine Memorial Society). The association's goals were to annual observe the anniversary of the ship's destruction by holding ceremonies at the Maine Memorial in Arlington National Cemetery and Havana, and to press for the establishment of a more formal, larger memorial at Arlington. The association elected now-Admiral Charles D. Sigsbee as its president.

=== Passage of Maine memorial legislation ===
Representative Sulzer renewed pressure to pass the Maine salvage bill on February 16, 1909. Three days later, the House Appropriations Committee approved an omnibus appropriations bill that authorized the President to call for proposals and provide an estimate for the salvage operation to Congress. But the 60th Congress came to an end without passage of the legislation.

In the second session of the 61st Congress, Representative George A. Loud submitted legislation again calling for the raising of the wreck of the Maine. This legislation won widespread support. President William Howard Taft endorsed the bill on January 11, providing major support for the effort. At the Maine memorial services on February 15 in Arlington National Cemetery, Admiral Sigsbee called for repatriation of all bodies and the construction of a larger memorial. At a meeting a few days later, the United Spanish War Veterans (an association for veterans of the Spanish–American War) passed a resolution demanding the raising of the wreck of the Maine and bring any remains found home for burial at Arlington National Cemetery. Sigsbee then called on February 26 for all veterans groups to unite behind a plan to salvage the wreck, repatriate all remains, and establish a memorial.

On February 28, a subcommittee of the House Naval Affairs Committee favorably reported the Loud bill. The amended legislation called for a contractor to salvage the Maine and for all bodies found to be buried at Arlington National Cemetery. The full House of Representatives passed the legislation on March 23, after having amended it to require the Army Corps of Engineers to do the work and for construction of a new memorial featuring the Maine's mast at Arlington. Anticipating passage of the bill, the Maine Memorial Association began raising money to help built the memorial. The Senate concurred in the legislation on May 4.

On May 9, 1910, President Taft signs into law the bill titled "Raising of battleship Maine" (Public Law 61-169) which required the United States Army Corps of Engineers to raise and remove the wreck of the Maine from Havana Harbor. The law appropriated $100,000 for this task. The legislation further required that any bodies found be transported to Arlington National Cemetery and interred there. The mast of the Maine was to be retained and taken to Arlington, where the United States Secretary of War was required to erect the mast on top of a suitable monument at or near the place where the dead of the Maine were laid to rest.

=== Preparing to raise the Maine ===
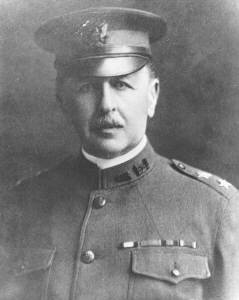
Col. William M. Black (depicted here about 1916) led the effort to raise the Maine

The Army Corps of Engineers began working on plans to raise the Maine in late July 1910. A "special board of engineers" was appointed from Corps ranks to work on the problem and oversee the project. Colonel William M. Black, Lieutenant Colonel H. H. Patrick, and Captain Harley B. Ferguson. The President of Cuba, José Miguel Gómez, promised the full cooperation of his government.

The Corps immediately alerted Congress in May 1910 that the job could not be done for the $100,000 appropriated. On June 17, Congress appropriated $200,000 more, and authorized the Corps to sign contracts for whatever services it needed (without regard to cost). In August, the Special Engineering Board decided not to bring the Maine back to the United States but to sink her at sea. The wreck would be surveyed before any work began. Caissons would then be constructed around the wreck to form a cofferdam, the water pumped out, and any bodies removed.

The Special Board made its first visit to the wreck of the Maine on September 10, 1910, measuring the site and taking soundings. Preliminary borings and additional soundings were made the following week, giving the Special Board enough information to make more formal plans for salvaging the wreck. The Maine was found to be lying in 25 feet (7.6 m) of water, and the Corps of Engineers believed that 75 bodies lay within the wreck of the Maine. (Contemporary accounts claim that only 68 bodies were missing.) The first human remains aboard the Maine were found near the rear cabins on September 22, 1910, while measurements and soundings were taken. Cuban divers examining the wreck discovered the bones, but did not disturb them.

It was immediately clear that the 1898 explosion had done far more damage to the Maine than previously assumed, and that the ship might not be capable of refloating at all. The caisson plan, however, was nevertheless considered risky. The Special Board sought the approval of President Taft for the caisson plan and the decision to sink the wreck at sea. The work included contracting for local labor wherever possible, but using U.S. Navy ships and derricks. Taft gave his approval on October 13. Taft invited Cuba and Spain to name a representative to be on-site during the salvage operation at all times. The Spanish agreed to observer status. With the plan approved, the Lackawanna Steel Company began manufacturing the interlocking steel piles to create the caisson walls.

=== Retrieval of bodies ===
Piles for the caissons began to be driven on December 6, 1910, and the last was in place on March 31, 1911. Twenty caissons were constructed, with pilings driven 72 feet (22 m) through water, mud and clay. More than 75,000 cubic feet (2,100 m^{3}) of water was then pumped out of the cofferdam.

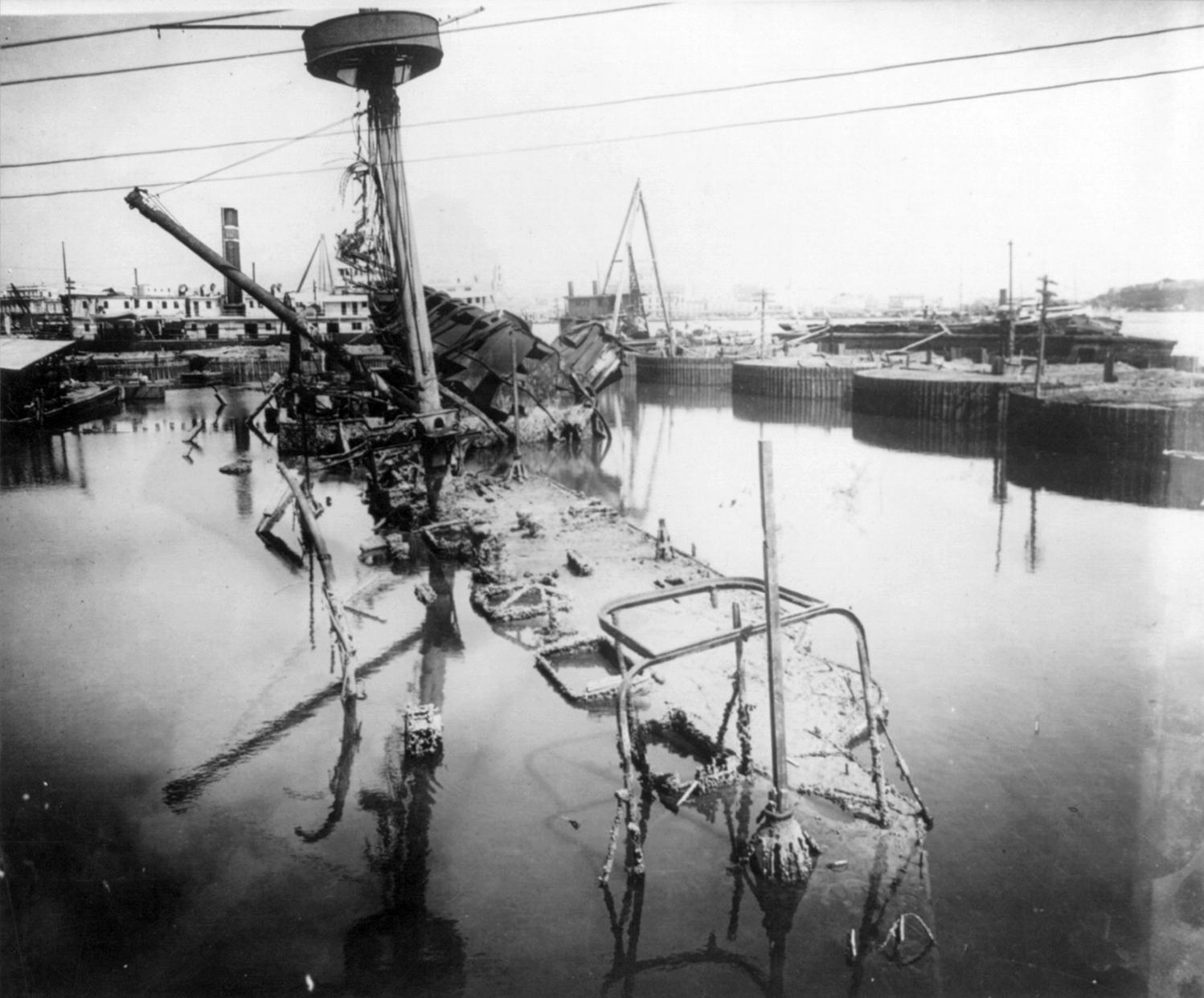
Looking forward from the stern of the Maine in late 1911. Note the caissons in place around the wreck, creating the cofferdam.

The first human remains (some ribs and small wrist bones), found outside the hull, were brought to the surface on January 3, 1911, by Cuban divers working on the Maine. The top of the starboard turret was detected some 100 feet (30 m) from the wreck in late February after piles being driven into the mud and clay of Havana Harbor struck the object. The turret top was raised on March 12, and a human foot was found adhered to the turret by fire. The ship's starboard anchor (one of six she carried) was raised on March 15.

With the caissons finished at the end of March, they were filled with clay, mud, and rock. Wood platforms were constructed on top of the caissons to support the cranes and derricks to be used to handle the wreck. Once the caissons were filled, water would begin to be drained from inside the cofferdam. Since construction of such a large, deep cofferdam had not been attempted before, the Corps said it would suspend draining from time to time to assess the performance of the caissons and ensure the cofferdam was still secure. The search for bodies, the Army said, would take precedence over anything else aboard the wreck. Filling the cofferdam again ("rewatering") would not occur until probably the end of December 1911.

Scaffolding was erected over the stern to facilitate the removal of the mizzenmast (or aft mast) and deck fittings. These items were stored in a hut constructed on one of the cofferdams or aboard the collier USS Leonidas (AD-7). On May 27, 1911, Leonidas transported the mizzenmast back to the United States.

Thirty additional partial remains were found aboard the wreck on May 3. Consisting mostly of skulls (often partially crushed) and rib bones, the remains were placed in a single coffin.

By May 31, water within the cofferdam was down by 5 feet (1.5 m), revealing most of the starboard quarterdeck. Some bending of the steel piles used in one of the caissons was seen on May 31. Draining was suspended until June 15 to determine the caisson's stability. Once it was determined the caisson was not in danger of rupture, water was drained another 5 feet (1.5 m). The Corps said on June 7 it would be three to four weeks before draining was complete.

In early June, the Maine's 10 short tons (8.9 long tons) fore-mast was retrieved from the wreck, and shipped aboard the Ward Line commercial passenger ship SS Bayamo to New York City. The 50-foot (15 m) mast was broken off near the deck by the explosion, and badly bent and twisted. Heavily rusted and covered in coral on its lower part, the mast was quite brittle after its stay in saltwater. It was initially stored at the U.S. Army's east coast regional headquarters, but transferred to the Brooklyn Navy Yard.

By June 15, the water level in the caisson was down 7 feet (2.1 m). It was now apparent that the bow of the ship had been completely destroyed by the 1898 blast, and most of the central third of the ship was ruined as well. Although the stern listed seven degrees to port, the central third of the ship only listed four degrees to port. Engineers realized that the hull had broken amidship. The Corps of Engineers began to radically revise its plans for refloating the ship, and there was concern that the ship might need to be removed in pieces. With less need to protect the ship from further damage, Corps officials said they would lower the water level down to 18 to 20 feet (5.5 to 6.1 m) over the next three to four days. This would completely reveal the central section of the ship, while leaving the bow under water.

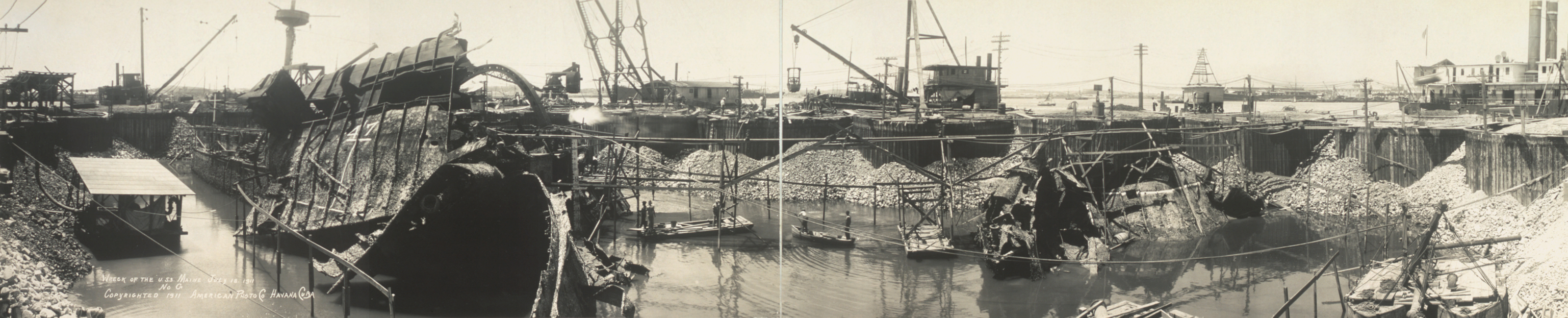
Panoramic view of the wreck of the USS Maine. The view toward the left and rear is across the bow (the remains of which lie beneath the water), toward the center third of the ship. The nearly-intact stern is just visible beyond the wrecked center section.

With no remains found since May 3, the Corps of Engineers began to fear on June 16 that no more bodies would be found. In part this was due to the condition of the ship. Army engineers told the press that sides of the bow appeared to have blown outward, with the upper deck detaching from the ship. This caused wreckage to be strewn laterally over Havana Harbor, leaving a large debris field. The explosion was so powerful that the ship's 100 short tons (89 long tons) forward gun turret landed 100 feet (30 m) away, and the vessel's port and transverse armored bulkheads were buried 30 feet (9.1 m) into the mud of the harbor floor. Some armor was never found. The bow's upper deck rose into the air, turned upside-down, and landed on the central third of the Maine. The bow detached from the ship at frame 14, and the bow's keel detached from the ship at frame 18. What remained of the bow landed at the bottom of Havana Harbor at a 45-degree angle to the rest of the ship, pointing to starboard. The bow keel was bent upward in the middle by about 30 feet (9.1 m). The inner shell of the ship's double-bottomed hull was thrown upward, and came to rest on top of what remained of the bow. Investigators could not determine if it was forced into that position by an exterior explosion or if it was pulled upward as the bow detached. The forward portion of what remained of the keel rested on the inner shell, with the rear portion buried deep in the mud. Again, investigators could not determine if the explosion bent the keel and forced it into this position or if the suction created by the outward-expanding hull pulled it there. As the bow settled, it listed almost onto its starboard side. The central third of the ship was devastated by the explosion and collapse of the bow's upper deck onto it, and was partially detached from the stern. The stern, however, was in remarkably good shape and seemingly undisturbed by the blast. Even the aft turret guns were still in place. Nonetheless, Corps officials said they were seriously considering breaking up the wreck rather than raising it. A model of the wreck was made by a naval constructor.

Four days later, on June 20, more human remains were found on the upper deck between the aft turret and the engine room. These included two forearms and a foot in a boot. All the remains were heavily charred. Additionally, workers were recovering a very large number of relics such as bayonets, binoculars, books, clothing, dishes, and papers (some of them in watertight boxes, and still dry). The water level was now down 14 feet (4.3 m), and dropping.

A nearly two-week delay in recovering additional remains occurred in late June and early July as workers struggled to remove mud from the interior of the stern. By July 19, water levels inside the cofferdam were down 18 feet (5.5 m) (with just 4 feet (1.2 m) of water left to pump out), but it was clear by then that most of the bow wreckage lay buried in 37 feet (11 m) of mud. The Corps advised that it would take several months to erect all the cranes and derricks needed to remove the heaviest wreckage.

Additional remains were soon uncovered. On July 19, a skull, some jawbone fragments, and several vertebrae were discovered in mud on the main deck. Corps workers believed this represented the remains about three people. As the last 4 feet (1.2 m) of water was pumped out and the suction dredges began removing the soft mud around the bow, the remains of four more individuals were found near the conning tower. These remains were heavily scorched. These discoveries gave the Army hope that more remains might be found. Efforts to remove the mud were redoubled, although Corps engineers said it would take three to four months to clear all the mud and complete a thorough search for the wreck.

The ship's bell was found in the mud, split in half by the explosion, on July 22, 1911. The vessel's memorial silver service, given to the ship in 1891 by the people of Maine, was also retrieved during salvage.

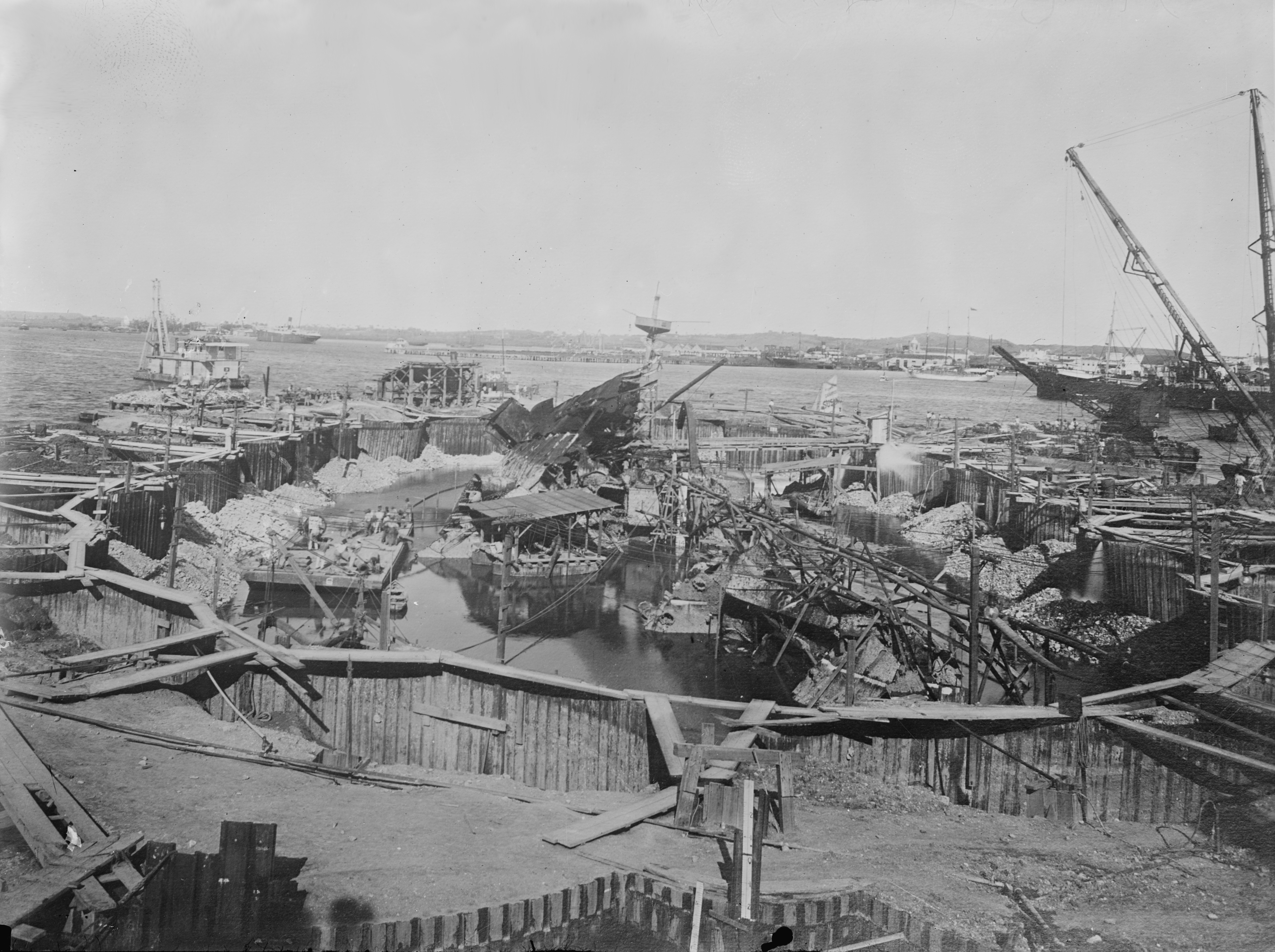
Caissons form a cofferdam around the wreck of the Maine in late summer 1912

More remains were found the day after the ship's bell was rediscovered. These represented six or seven crewmen, and were found among the wreckage of the central portion of the ship near the conning tower. The bones were found in a confused mass, scorched by fire, and many were incomplete or fractured. Some were skulls which had portions missing, and many were small fragments. Workers reported that additional remains were wedged tightly in twisted masses of steel, and could not be easily removed without the use of acetylene torches. The remains of another three to four men were found on the central superstructure on July 24. Again, some showed the action of fire.

The salvage operation began running out of money in late July. On July 26, the Corps asked Congress for another $250,000, to bring the total expenditures on the wreck to $900,000. That same day, a nearly intact human skeleton was found on the starboard berth deck in the central section. Two more nearly intact bodies were found on July 29 on the berth deck near the warrant officers' quarters. Congress appropriated the $250,000 on July 31.

On August 2, a nearly intact skeleton was found in the wardroom of the Maine. On the basis of clothing, height, and personal effects, the skeleton was identified as that of Assistant Engineer Darwin R. Merritt. His body was placed aboard the battleship USS North Carolina (ACR-12), and taken to the Brooklyn Navy Yard. The ship arrived on August 12, and Merritt's body turned over to his relatives. His family buried him in a cemetery in Red Oak, Iowa. Two more bodies, neither of them identifiable, were also found near the warrant officers' quarters, bringing the total number of dead found to 21. Additional bones were found embedded in the wreckage on August 3. By August 14, more remains had been found, bringing the total number of full and partial bodies found to 25. Some skulls still lay wrapped in the wreckage too tightly to retrieve.

Work to remove the main mast from the wreck began on September 2, 1911. The mast was removed in preparation for the severing of the stern of the ship (which the Corps of Engineers believed might be refloated) from the wrecked central and bow sections. This work quickly revealed even more remains. Four more bodies were found near the petty officers' quarters on September 26, and six more bodies were located in the engine room on September 28. The boilers were found intact, although the 1898 explosion had driven one through the rear bulkhead to rest against the aft boilers. This led workers to believe that more bodies might be found in the engine room. But no more bodies were found there. The last set of remains to be retrieved from the USS Maine was a single skeleton, found in the wreckage of the bow on October 16, 1911.

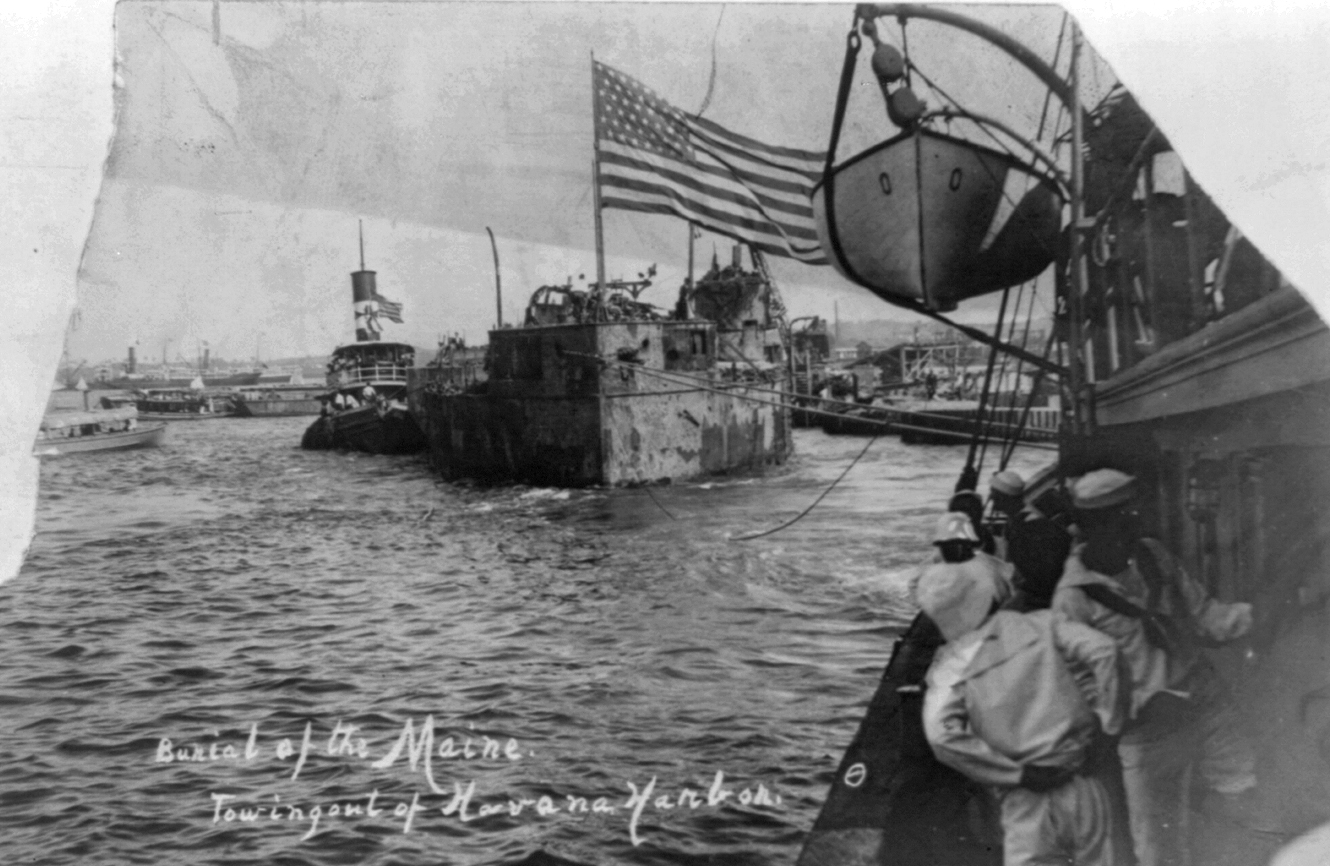
View from the USS Osceola as the Maine is towed to its ocean grave on March 16, 1912

The Army Corps of Engineers said its investigation of the wreck of the Maine would cease at the end of November 1911. The stern section of the ship proved watertight, and a wooden bulkhead was built across the section to allow it to float. Refloating the wreck, sinking it at sea, and removing the caissons would take another $250,000, the Corps said on November 8. By mid-December the funds had not been appropriated, and working on the Maine was scheduled to halt. When debate on the funds opened on December 16, Representative James R. Mann and Representative Thomas U. Sisson nearly came to blows when Sisson proposed that parts of the wreck be sold at auction to reduce the costs of the salvage operation. Both Sisson and Representative Robert B. Macon had also proposed exhibiting the wreck for a fee, but Representative John J. Fitzgerald (chair of the House Appropriations Committee) said there would be public riots anywhere it appeared. While members of the House disagreed over whether to sell parts of the Maine, they were united in allowing the Secretary of the Navy to donate relics and portions of the hull to any municipality or patriotic organization which asked for them. Additionally, the House voted to give the city of Havana a portion of the wreck for the construction of a memorial. This version of the legislation passed. On January 13, the Secretary of the Navy established a two-person panel consisting of Lieutenant Colonel Edward Burr (Army Corps of Engineers) and Commander Richard H. Leigh (U.S. Navy) to determine which cities and groups should get relics from the wreck.

Sinking of the Maine occurred on March 16, 1912. About a third of the vessel was wreckage, which was cut into 0.5 short tons (0.45 long tons) pieces and then dumped at sea about 1 mile (1.6 km) from the coast of Cuba. The aft, portside turret was given to the people of Havana for use as a memorial. But the forward, starboardside turret was buried too deeply in the mud for removal. To free the stern from the mud, diggers were forced to go 5 feet (1.5 m) below the keel. Seacocks were emplaced in the keel of the ship, and jets pumped water below the keel to help loosen the mud's hold on the vessel. Once the stern was free, water was slowly allowed into the cofferdam. When the stern's deck was level with the cofferdam, two of the caissons were removed to give the Maine access to the harbor. After three attempts to free the Maine from the mud, the ship began floating on February 15. The USS Osceola (AT-47), an armed tugboat, towed the Maine out of the cofferdam and into the harbor.

More than 80,000 Cubans watched as the Osceola towed the USS Maine out of Havana harbor. Cannon at the La Cabaña fortress fired every 30 minutes from 10:00 a.m. until 2:15 pm, after which "minute guns" sounded every 60 seconds until the procession passed. Behind the Maine followed the battleship USS North Carolina with the remains of the dead aboard her. Following the North Carolina were the cruiser USS Birmingham (CL-2), three gunboats of the Cuban Navy, and a number of private vessels. The main guns of the North Carolina fired when the 1 mile (1.6 km), 2 miles (3.2 km), and 3 miles (4.8 km) marks were reached. About 4 miles (6.4 km) out to sea, naval personnel opened the seacocks at about 5:10 P.M. local time. The USS Maine sank at 5:30 p.m. as a bugler aboard the North Carolina sounded taps. The guns of the North Carolina and the Birmingham fired once, and the ceremony ended

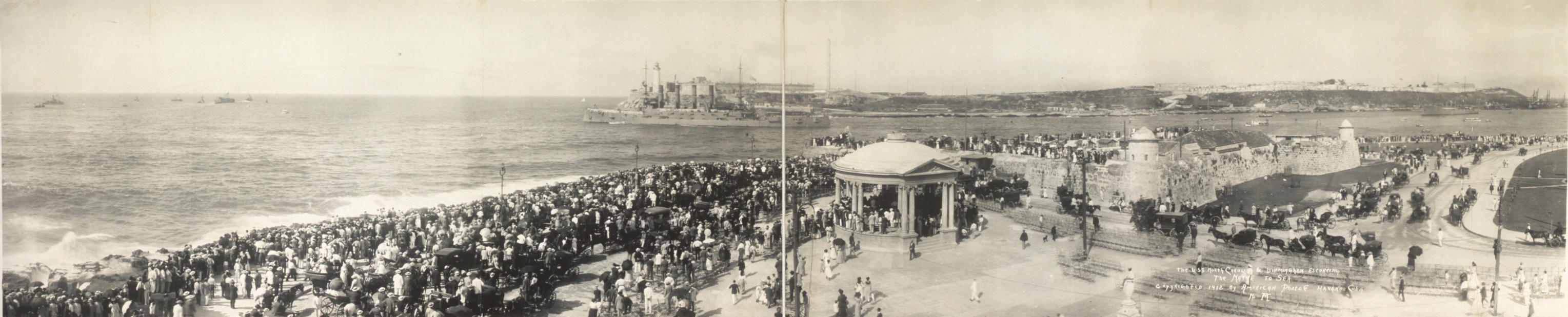
The battleship USS North Carolina (center) and the cruiser USS Birmingham (far right) escort the wreck of the Maine (far left, in distance) to its final resting place

After the Maine was sunk at sea, the cofferdam was removed. Under an agreement with the Cuban authorities, the Corps dredged the entire area in and around the shipwreck to a depth of 37.5 feet (11.4 m) to ensure that no material remained in the mud or clay which might present a danger to navigation. A great deal of material was brought up and sunk at sea. Some items, such as the ship's forward gun, were too heavy to raise. Dynamite was used to destroy these items so that they did not project above the seabed. Operations at the site were completed on December 2, 1912.

=== Repatriating the bodies ===
Preparations for receiving the bodies of the USS Maine began in June 1911. Captain James D. Tilford and undertaker Oliver B. Jenkins of Washington, D.C., took charge of the remains in Havana. They were assisted by the Maine's former chaplain, Father John Chidwick. Their plan was to place each set of remains in a coffin, which would be kept under guard at the La Cabaña fortress. The assumption of many involved in the operation was that the USS Leonidas would take the remains to the United States (just as it did other relics from the ship). Tilford and Jenkins ordered 25 coffins from the United States, believing that most of the 75 missing bodies had been blown far out into the harbor by the explosion and would not be recovered. (Their assumption was based, in part, on Father Chidwick's testimony that he saw bodies blown as high as 60 feet (18 m) into the air by the explosion.)

President Gomez ordered all flags in the city to fly at half-mast and the minute guns at La Cabaña and Morro Castle to fire every 30 seconds every day that dead were brought to the surface.

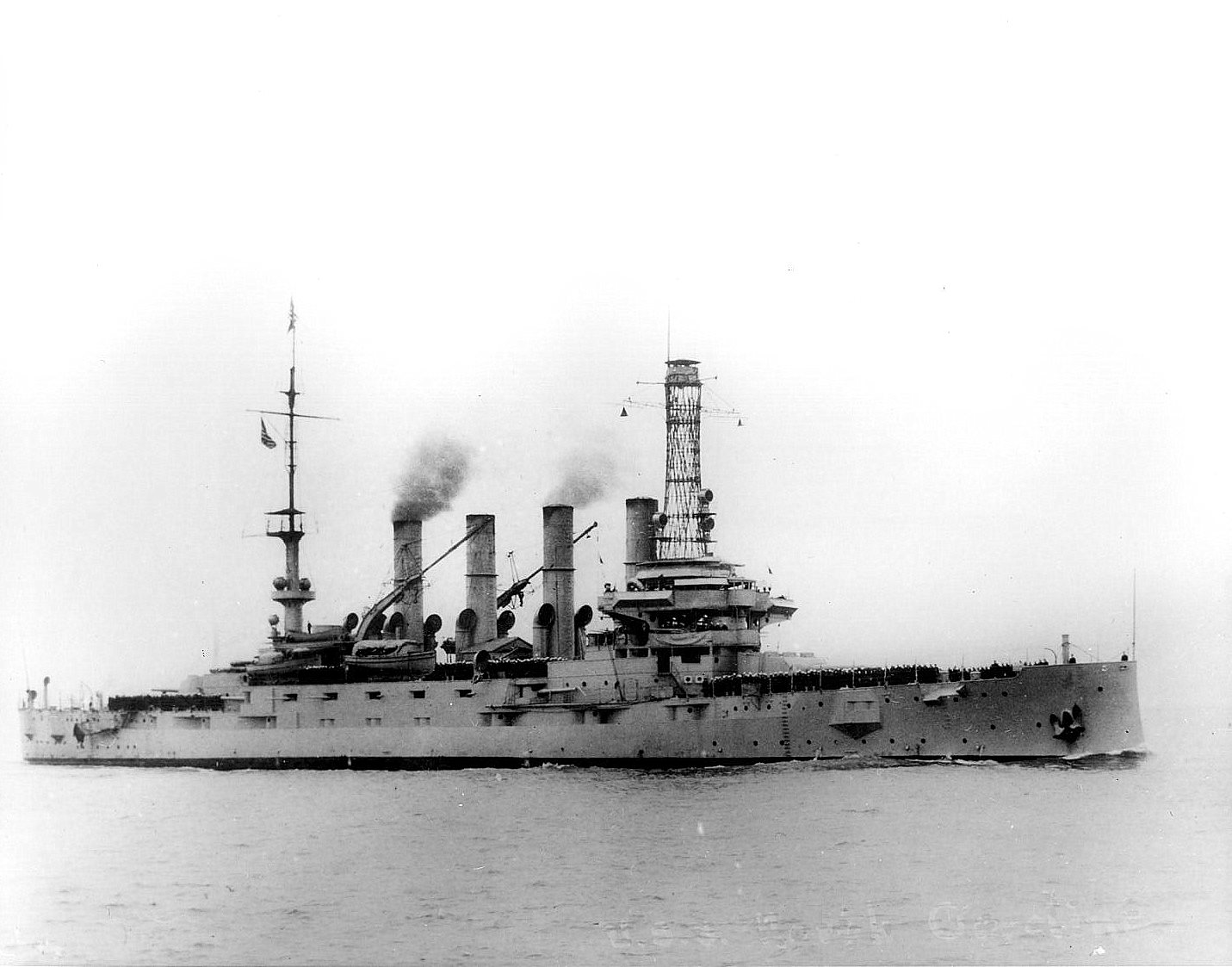
The USS North Carolina, which carried the dead of the Maine home to the United States in 1899

In August 1911, President Taft learned that the collier Leonidas might be carrying the Maine dead home to the United States. Believing that this would dishonor the dead, Taft ordered the U.S. Navy to send a battleship to Cuba provide transport instead. Taft also directed the Corps of Engineers to assign an officer to oversee the bodies while in transport. Major George LeRoy Irwin was assigned this duty on August 28.

On January 7, 1912, the War Department announced tentative plans for bringing the Maine's dead to the United States. It said that the battleships USS North Carolina and the USS Washington (ACR-11) would bear the bodies, escorted by the cruisers USS Birmingham (CL-2) and USS Salem (CL-3) and the salvage ship USS Chesapeake (ID-3395). When it became clear by mid February that no further human remains were likely to be found, the War Department scaled back its plans so that the bodies would be borne by the USS North Carolina, with an escort by the USS Birmingham. The North Carolina would bear the dead to Hampton Roads, at which point the bodies would be placed aboard the Birmingham and taken to the Washington Navy Yard.

President Gomez personally oversaw the honors given to the dead of the Maine before the bodies left Havana. There were 34 coffins, all but one of which contained the remains of two individuals. The coffins were moved from La Cabaña to city hall (the Palacio de los Capitanes Generales) the evening of March 14, where the bodies lay in state overnight. Public viewing of the remains began at 2:00 p.m. local time on March 15, and ended at 10:00 a.m. on March 16. More than 30,000 paid their respects to the dead. Throughout the day on March 16, cannon at La Cabaña and Morro Castle fired every half hour.

After the public viewing ended, Cuban Army artillerymen loaded the coffins aboard caissons. Commander Charles F. Hughes of the Birmingham led a contingent of 300 marines and bluejackets and the North Carolina's band escorted the dead to Machina Wharf. Accompanying the funeral cortege were Brigadier General William Herbert Bixby, Army Corps Chief of Engineers; Julio de Cárdenas, Mayor of Havana; Alfredo Zayas y Alfonso, Vice President of Cuba; and members of the Cuban Cabinet. Six U.S. Navy sailors loaded the first coffins a funeral barge, while Cuban military personnel moved the remainder. The barges took the remains to the North Carolina. As the North Carolina passed out of the harbor, soldiers of the Cuban Army lined the walls of La Cabaña and Morro Castle and stood at attention while a military band played a funeral dirge. Hand-painted porcelain funeral wreaths, a gift of the Cuban government, were placed on the coffins.

=== Burying the last of the Maine dead ===
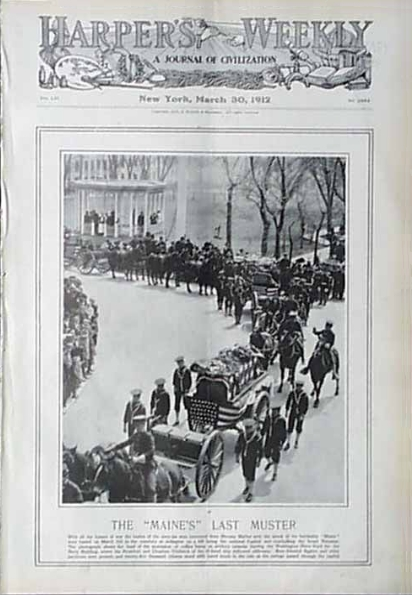
Coverage of the burial of the last Maine dead from Harper's Weekly in 1912

The USS North Carolina arrived at Hampton Roads at about 4:30 P.M. local time on March 19, 1912. Transferral of the dead took until 7:30 p.m. The crews of six other U.S. Navy warships anchored at Hampton Roads stood at attention on their decks, and the ships flew their flags at half-mast. Two battalions of bluejackets from the North Carolina joined the Birmingham as an honor guard.

The Birmingham arrived at the Washington Navy Yard at 10:45 a.m. on March 20. At noon, the coffins were removed from ship and taken to the State, War, and Navy Building, one block east of the White House. A 200-man cavalry unit from Fort Myer carried the coffins aboard caissons. An honor guard consisting of the Third Battalion of the Third Field Artillery; a battalion of bluejackets from the North Carolina; a battalion of bluejackets from the Birmingham; a battalion of Marines from Norfolk, Virginia; 200 Army engineers from Fort Washington, Maryland; a battalion of Marines from Fort Washington; a battalion of bluejackets from the Washington Navy Yard; a battalion of bluejackets from Baltimore, Maryland; and 50 members of the District of Columbia Naval National Guard accompanied the dead. The naval band from the USS Mayflower (PY-1) accompanied the honor guard, playing funeral dirges. Tents were erected on the south side of the State, War, and Navy Building, and the caissons bearing the flag-draped coffins lined up beneath the tents at about 2:00 P.M.

A brief memorial service was held at 2:30 p.m. Congress adjourned for the ceremony, and the entire Cabinet was present. President Taft was the main speaker. On the dais to his right was Antonio Martin-Rivero, Cuban ambassador to the United States. To Taft's left were Rear Admiral Sigsbee and now-Rear Admiral Wainwright. United States Naval Academy Chaplain G. Livingston Bayard provided the invocation. Father Chidwick gave a lengthy oration, followed by a short speech by President Taft. The Right Reverend W.F. Anderson gave the benediction.

The funeral cortege then departed for Arlington National Cemetery for a graveside funeral service. President Taft had ordered full military honors for the dead. The funeral was held near the anchor which constituted the Maine Memorial, and a tent was set up for President Taft and other dignitaries. The Marine Corps Band played funeral dirges, and Chaplain Bayard read the Episcopal funeral service over the dead. Maurice Simmons, Commander of the United Spanish War Veterans, gave a brief speech. Eight United Spanish War Veterans served as honorary pall bearers for the dead. Three Spanish–American War veterans then laid a white rose, a sprig of evergreen, and a small American flag on the coffins. The Fort Myer cavalry unit delivered a 21-gun salute, followed by a taps played by a bugler. The ceremony ended with a 21-gun salute from cannon at nearby Fort Myer.

Estimates of the number of dead in the burial field around the monument include 229, 230, and 232.

== Constructing the Maine Mast Memorial ==
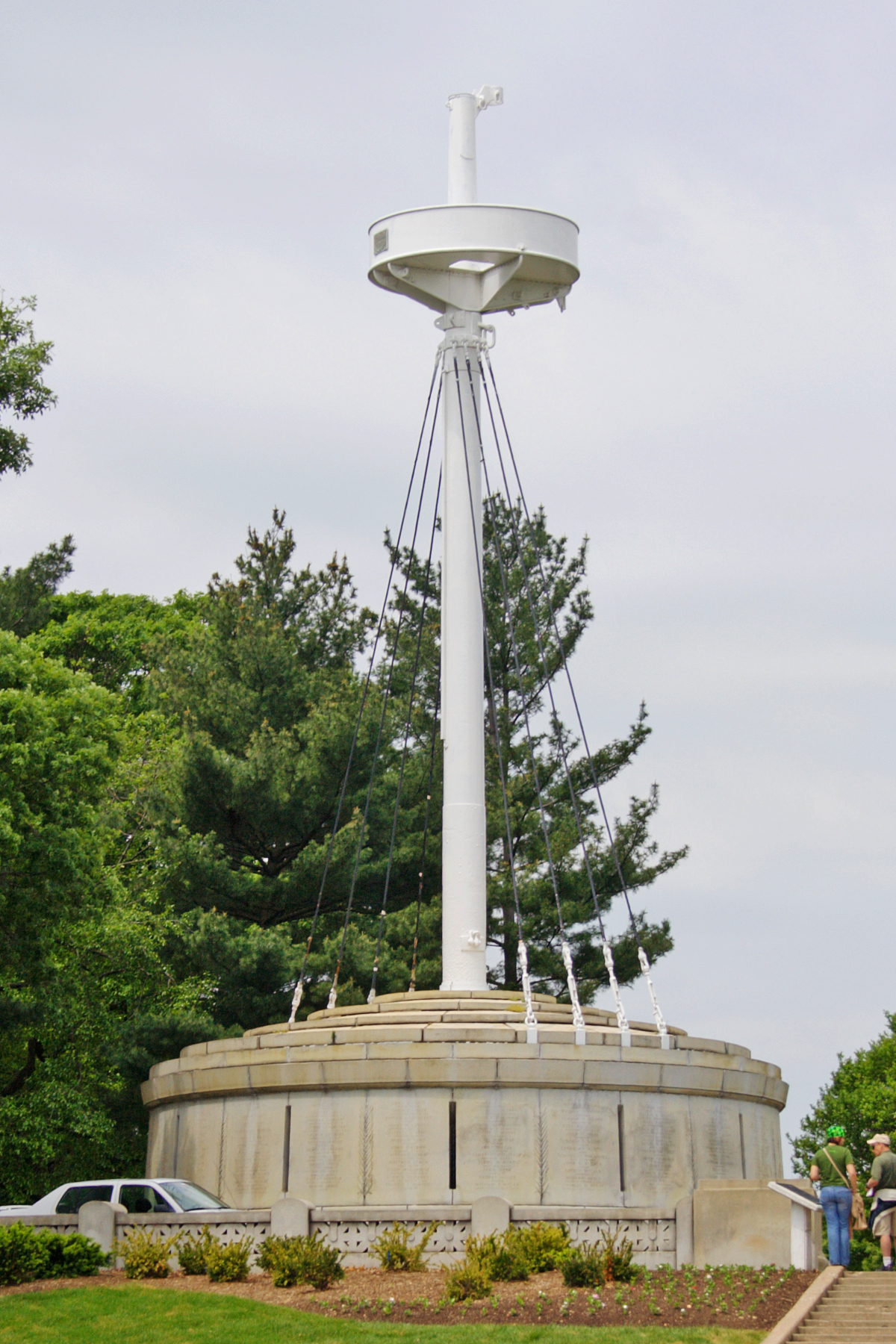
The completed Memorial

As work proceeded on salvaging the wreck of the USS Maine, work on the memorial at Arlington National Cemetery also began. Initially, this work was halted in August 1911 by a lack of funds. The U.S. Army said that the bodies and the Maine's mast would be stored at Arlington if no funds were appropriated.

The Maine's main mast was brought to the United States by the USS Leonidas in March 1912. The Maine's foremast was also located, and the USS Sterling carried it to the U.S. Naval Academy in August.

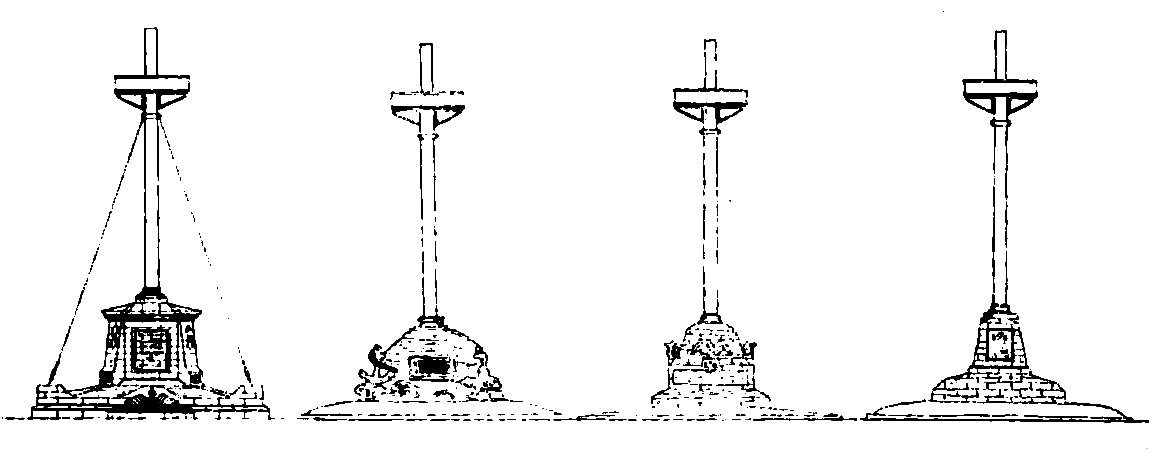
Four preliminary designs for the Maine Mast Memorial which were rejected by the Commission of Fine Arts

Work on the memorial began again in early 1912. Just two years earlier, Congress had established the United States Commission of Fine Arts (CFA), and gave the body the power to advise regarding the siting of monuments and memorials. Given the reputation of the CFA's members (which included some of the most highly regarded architects, painters, landscape architects, sculptors, and other artists of the day) and the strong political support the commission had (particularly from President Taft and the U.S. Senate), the commission's advice was rarely rejected. The CFA reviewed preliminary designs submitted by the War Department, and gave its views on how the memorial should be treated. But no decision was made. Privately, the CFA voiced its opinion that the designs submitted were very poor. The commission advised the War Department to select a designer rather than hold a competition. The CFA recommended promising local architect Nathan C. Wyeth, who designed the Russell Senate Office Building in 1903 and the West Wing of the White House in 1909, including the now-iconic Oval Office. The Secretary of War agreed, and Wyeth was hired to submit a design.

In January 1913, the Corps of Engineers reported that enough funds were left over from salvage of the Maine to permit construction of the Arlington National Cemetery Memorial. The following month, shortly before the commemoration ceremonies at the Maine Memorial at Arlington, President Taft announced his preference for the establishment of the memorial in the field of the Maine dead rather than another location in the cemetery. Secretary of War Lindley Miller Garrison then placed the design project on hold to allow the CFA to consider placement of the memorial in relation to three other projects also approved for construction: The Arlington Memorial Bridge (which included a new drive to a new ceremonial gateway to the cemetery), Arlington Memorial Amphitheater, and a receiving vault and chapel. After discussions about the proposed location for the memorial, Wyeth submitted three designs to the CFA. In executive session, the commission made a recommendation to the Secretary of War. Acting Quartermaster General Henry Granville Sharpe recommended that Secretary of War Garrison accept Wyeth's design, and he did by June 30, 1913.

The cost of the memorial was set at $55,613.

In June 1913, the Washington Navy Yard transferred the Maine's mast to Arlington National Cemetery. As the design process proceeded from preliminary to final designs, Wyeth consults extensively with the CFA. In the fall of 1913, the commission approved the placement of a small bronze memorial plaque on the mast itself.

Construction on the Maine Mast Memorial began in late November 1913. Wyeth's design featured as a base a mausoleum which vaguely looked like a battleship gun turret. The mast of the Maine pierced the top of this structure, and was set into the floor below. The design called for an exterior made of tan granite, and an interior lined with white marble. The names of those who died aboard the Maine were to be inscribed on the exterior of the mausoleum. The granite for the structure came from Troy, New Hampshire, and the marble from Danby, Vermont. Eight months were originally allotted for construction, largely due to the need to chisel the 8,000 letters into the exterior. The Washington, D.C., firm of Norcross Bros. won the $44,637 contract to construct the memorial. This created some controversy, as Norcross was not the lowest bidder. However, Quartermaster General Sharpe recommended Norcross because the company could obtain the stone best suited for the memorial. A month's delay occurred as the contract was contested.

In December 1913, the Army Corps of Engineers reported that it had $104,364 in Maine salvage funds left over. This included $11,000 to start work on the memorial.

Initial work on the memorial proceeded quickly. Memorial services of the Maine dead were held at the unfinished memorial on February 15, 1914. For the first time, a joint ceremony sponsored by the Grand Army of the Republic, Army and Navy Union, and United Spanish War Veterans was held to pay tribute to the Maine. The United Spanish War Veterans women's auxiliary laid a wreath on the memorial's anchor, and Cuban ambassador Carlos Manuel de Céspedes laid a wreath at the unfinished memorial.

Problems in obtaining stone and cost overruns greatly delayed construction of the memorial. By August 1914, the cost of the structure had risen to $60,000. Most of the stone for the exterior and interior did not arrive until mid September, and the stonecutters needed six more weeks to ensure the stone was ready for placement. By mid October, the mast had been set and most of the exterior was in place. Even so, the memorial's completion was not expected until November 1, 1915.

The contractor worked swiftly to try to complete the memorial faster. On January 30, Army officials said the Maine Mast Memorial would probably be dedicated on Memorial Day. On February 15, President Woodrow Wilson and Mario García Menocal, President of Cuba, both placed large floral wreaths at the unfinished memorial. Charles H. Tompkins, Inc., of Washington, D.C., did the grading at the site.

=== Dedication of the Maine Mast Memorial ===
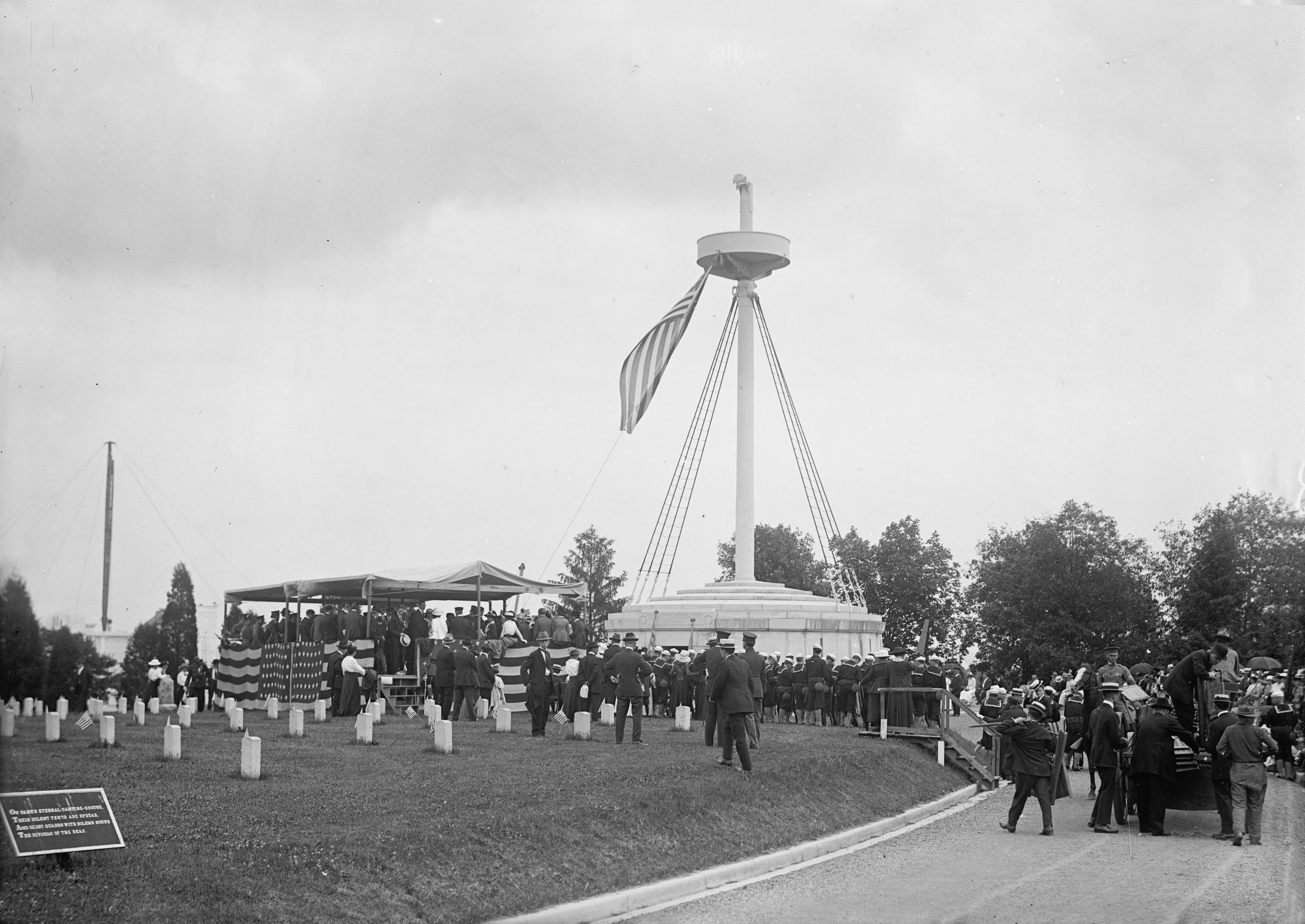
Dedication of the Maine Mast Memorial by President Woodrow Wilson on Memorial Day in 1915

Dedication of the Maine Mast Memorial occurred on May 30, 1915, as part of larger Memorial Day ceremonies at Arlington National Cemetery. At noon, President Wilson led a march of dignitaries and veterans from the White House to the Civil War Unknowns Monument, where he laid a wreath. Wilson and the dignitaries then proceeded to the Old Amphitheater, where he and others delivered speeches.

At 3:00 p.m., a regiment of U.S. Marines escorted President Wilson to the Maine Mast Memorial. The ceremony began with an invocation by Father Chidwick. Secretary of the Navy Josephus Daniels spoke first, followed by Charles Cramer, Commander of United Spanish War Veterans, and H. Oden Lake, National Commander of the Army and Navy Union.

Following the speeches, the American flag was raised to the top of the mast by Frank Arthur Daniels (age 11) and Jonathon Worth Daniels (age 13), sons of Secretary of the Navy Josephus Daniels. The Daniels boys were nephews of Ensign Worth Bagley, the first and only American naval officer to die in the Spanish–American War. The Daniels boys also raised signal flags which spelled out "Maine 1915". A 21-gun salute from cannon at Fort Myer occurred as the flags were raised. After the flag and signals were up, 50 marines in dress whites climbed into the rigging supporting the mast. The flag-raising was followed by speeches by John McElroy, Commander of the Department of the Potomac chapter of the Grand Army of the Republic; Major Robert Lee Longstreet, son of American Civil War Lieutenant General James Longstreet of the Confederate States Army; and Dr. Carlos Manuel de Céspedes y Quesada, Cuban ambassador to the United States. Taps were played to end the ceremony. Marines fired a 21-gun salute to President Wilson as the ceremonies ended.

After the official dedication ended, several veterans groups held a joint ceremony at the new Maine Mast Memorial. Rear Admiral George Washington Baird (ret.) spoke about the history of the battleship, the USS Maine, and the ship's salvaging. Secretary of State William Jennings Bryan spoke afterward.

On August 14, 1915, Secretary of War Garrison said that the Antiquities Act of 1906 encompassed the Maine Mast Memorial. This required the federal government to care for the monument in perpetuity.

== About the memorial ==
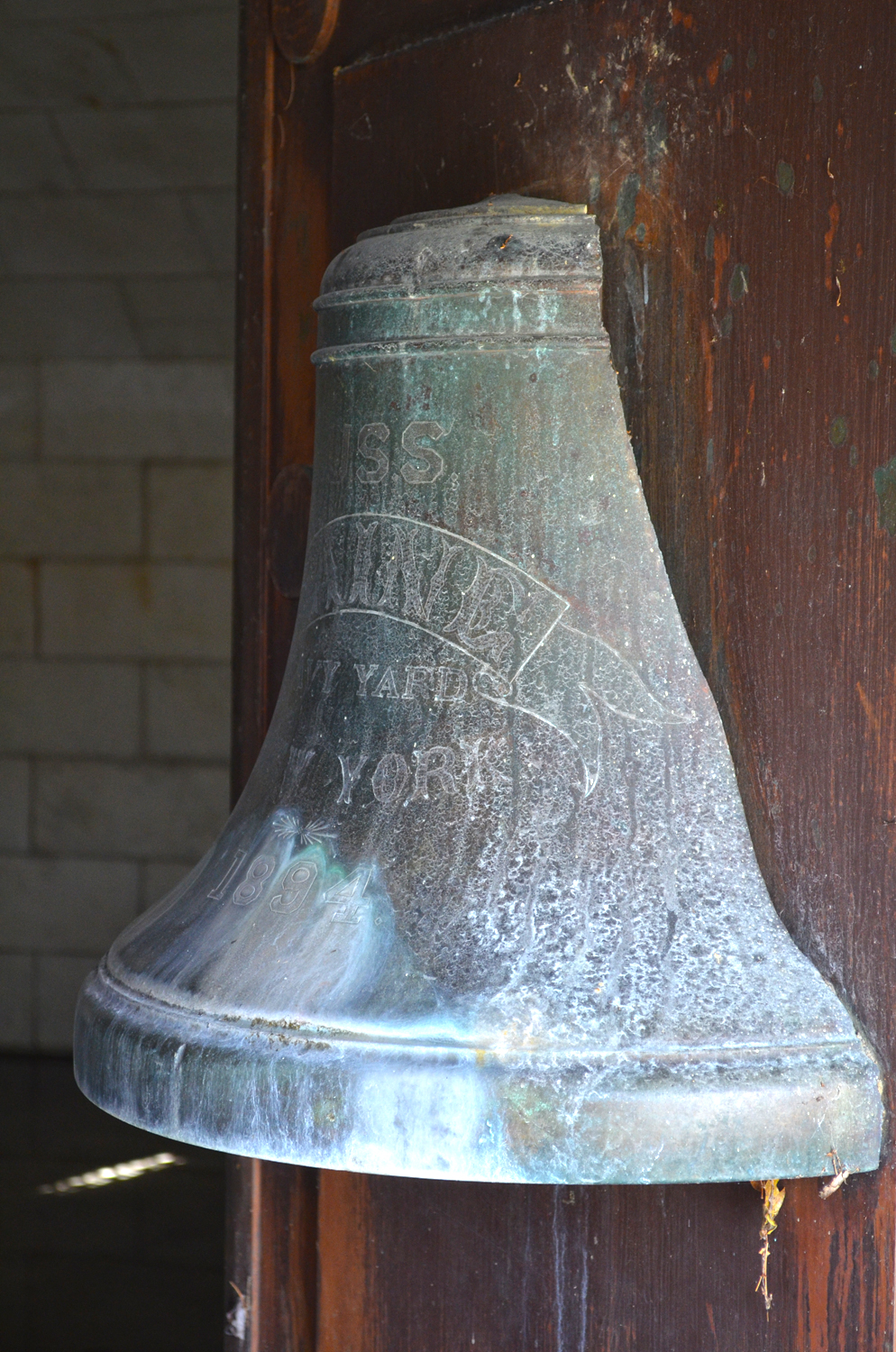
Bell of the USS Maine, broken in half by the 1898 explosion, attached to the door of the memorial at Arlington National Cemetery

The Maine Mast Memorial is located on Sigsbee Drive in Arlington National Cemetery. The monument is due west of Arlington Memorial Amphitheater.

The memorial consists of the main mast of the USS Maine set upright into the center of a circular, stylized mausoleum shaped to look like a battleship gun turret. The structure is 90 feet (27 m) in diameter and 15 feet (4.6 m) high. The mast pierces the roof the memorial, and is sunk into the floor inside. The mausoleum is constructed of reinforced concrete, sheathed in tan granite on the outside and white marble on the interior. The names and ranks of those who died aboard the Maine are carved into the exterior of the mausoleum, organized into 23 panels. There are eleven slit windows with bronze grills in the structure. The interior roof is a shallow dome, and the interior floor is lined with mosaic tile. The single entry to the mausoleum has two doors. The inner door is made of wood, and half the ship's bell (retrieved from the ocean floor in 1911) is attached to the outer side of this door. The outer door is a bronze gate decorated with metal rope and anchors. Ceremonial stone funeral urns stand on either side of the entryway. Above the door is carved the following: "Erected in memory of the officers and men who lost their lives in the destruction of the U.S.S. Maine, Habana, Cuba, February 15, 1898".

A road encircles the memorial. On the east side of the memorial is a concrete pad on which the anchor manufactured in 1900 sits. Two bronze Spanish mortars, cast in the 1700s and captured by Admiral Dewey during the Spanish–American War at Cavite Arsenal in the Philippines, flank the anchor. Originally, these mortars were placed atop brick piers with concrete caps. But when the anchor and mortars were incorporated into the new memorial, two granite balustrades were added along the roadway near the mortars.

A bronze shield was affixed to the mast by the Havana chapter of the Daughters of the American Revolution while it was still in Havana. This shield was retained when the mast was erected in 1915.

The memorial's 100th anniversary was celebrated on May 30, 2015. Dave Kammen, Director of Events and Ceremonies at Arlington National Cemetery, presided over a wreath-laying ceremony at the memorial. A U.S. Navy honor guard assisted in observing the event, at which "Taps" was played.

=== Changes to the memorial ===
In 1962, a terrace was constructed for the anchor and mortars. The terrace is paved with bluestone flagstones, and bluestone also replaced the concrete pad on which the anchor rested.

Minor repairs were made to the memorial in 1917 and 1995. The memorial underwent a $500,000 partial restoration in 2010.

In 2013, the USS Maine Mast Memorial began undergoing a complete restoration. The two-phase project began in September 2012 and is anticipated to be complete by Memorial Day in 2014. The first phase of the project will document the memorial's construction history, physical characteristics, and areas in need of renovation. Conservation recommendations will be part of this phase. The second phase of the project will involve conserving, restoring, and renovating the mast, the mast rigging, the terrace, and the approaches to the memorial. The goal of the second phase will be to restore to the memorial as much as possible to its original condition. This includes restoring damage, replacing lost pieces or parts, and eliminating alterations.

== Temporary entombments at the Maine Mast Memorial ==
100th anniversary of the USS Maine Mast Memorial dedication in 2015

Constructed as a mausoleum, the Maine Mast Memorial has served as the resting place for several individuals.

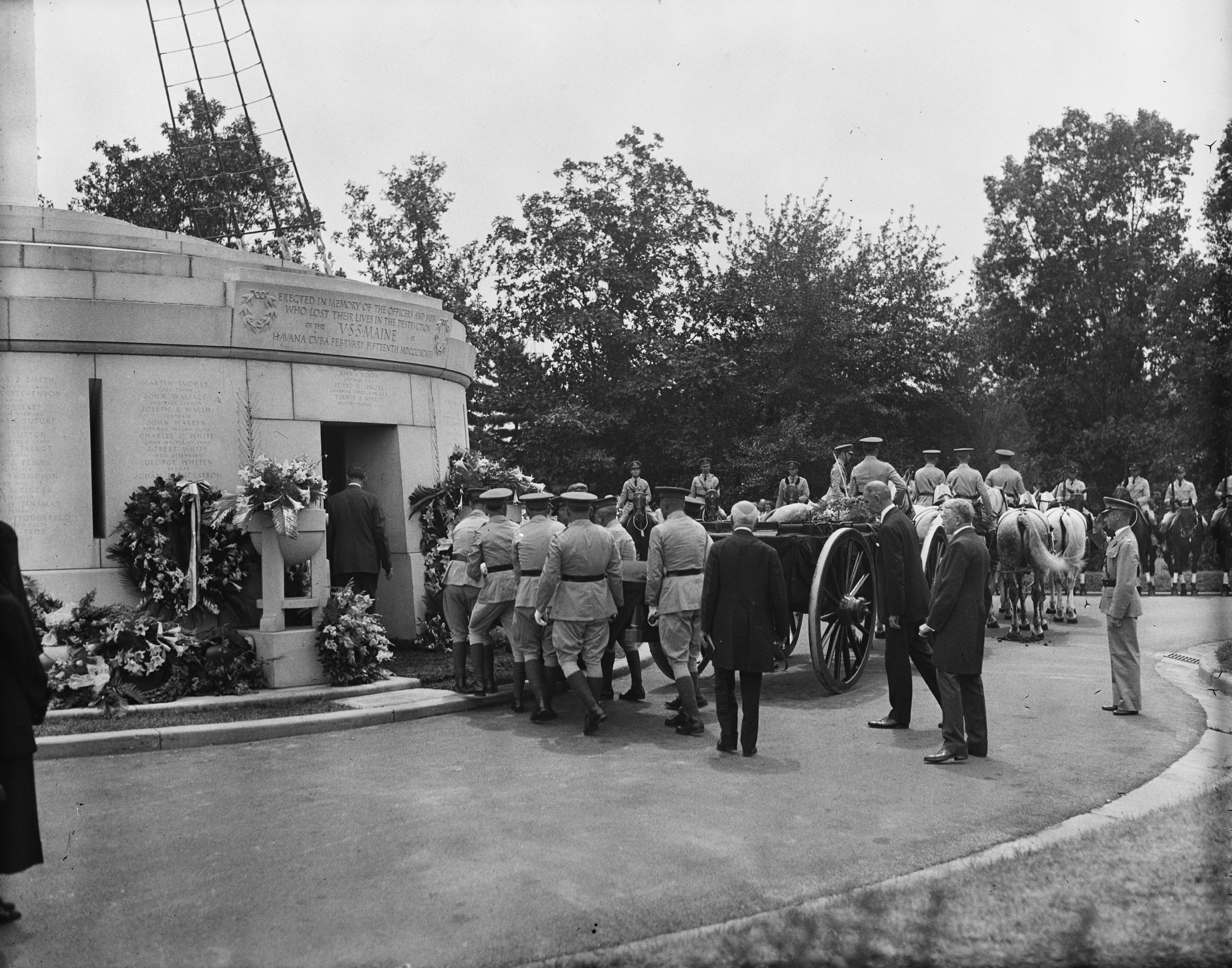
Burial of Ignacy Jan Paderewski at the Maine Mast Memorial in 1941

=== Lord Lothian ===
Beginning in 1939, Philip Kerr, 11th Marquess of Lothian was British ambassador to the United States. Lord Lothian died unexpectedly in December 1940. His remains were cremated, but with the Battle of the Atlantic making sea travel risky and air travel limited to only items of the highest importance, the United Kingdom agreed that Lord Lothian's ashes should remain in the United States until such time as they might be safely conveyed across the Atlantic. His ashes were interred in the Maine Mast Memorial on December 15, 1940, after a funeral at the Washington National Cathedral.

Lord Lothian's ashes were returned to the United Kingdom aboard an American naval vessel in December 1945.

=== Ignacy Jan Paderewski ===
In 1940, the internationally known pianist and composer Ignacy Jan Paderewski was named head of the Polish National Council, a Polish parliament in exile in London. He traveled extensively in the United States, building public support for the Polish people (who were under Nazi German rule). Paderewski fell ill on June 27, 1941, while on a speaking tour in America. The 80-year-old diplomat was diagnosed with pneumonia, and died in New York City on June 29. His body was temporarily interred in the Maine Mast Memorial on July 5, 1941, with the stipulation of the Polish National Council that it would be returned only to a free Poland. President John F. Kennedy dedicated a plaque on the interior of the memorial in May 1963, honoring Paderewski's memory.

Paderewski's remains were taken back to Poland in July 1992, 51 years after his death and two years after the collapse of the Polish communist dictatorship.

=== Manuel Quezon ===
Manuel Quezon was elected President of the Philippines for a second term on November 11, 1941. Just 27 days later, the Empire of Japan invaded the Philippines in what became known as the Philippines Campaign. On March 27, 1942, Quezon and his government fled the Philippines as the final American and Filipino defensive lines neared collapse. He traveled to the United States on May 9, 1942, and established a government in exile there. Quezon was extremely ill with tuberculosis, however, and he died at a "cure cottage" in Saranac Lake, New York, on August 1, 1944. His body was placed in the Maine Mast Memorial until it could be returned to a liberated Philippines.

Quezon's body was flown back to the Philippines on June 29, 1946.

=== Münir Ertegün ===
Munir Ertegun, Turkish ambassador to the United States, died in Washington on November 11, 1944. On November 15, his body was accompanied by a military guard of honor from the Turkish Embassy to Arlington National Cemetery, where it was temporarily interred in the Maine Mast Memorial. In April, 1946, Ertegun’s body was returned to Turkey aboard the USS Missouri.

== Bibliography ==
- Annual Reports of the War Department for the Fiscal Year Ended June 30, 1900. Reports of the Chiefs of Bureaus. Volume 2, Parts 1–8. Washington, D.C.: Government Printing Office, 1900.
- Atkinson, Rick. Where Valor Rests: Arlington National Cemetery. Washington, D.C.: National Geographic Society, 2007.
- Axelrod, Alex. Profiles in Folly: History's Worst Decisions and Why They Went Wrong. New York: Sterling Publishing Company, 2008.
- Blow, Michael. A Ship to Remember: The Maine and the Spanish–American War. New York: Morrow, 1992.
- Carlson, Charles. Weird Florida. New York: Sterling Publishing Company, 2005.
- Commission of Fine Arts. Report of the Commission of Fine Arts for the Fiscal Year Ending June 30, 1912. Washington, D.C.: Government Printing Office, 1912.
- Commission of Fine Arts. Report of the Commission of Fine Arts for the Fiscal Year Ending June 30, 1913. Washington, D.C.: Government Printing Office, 1913.
- Commission of Fine Arts. Report of the Commission of Fine Arts for the Fiscal Year Ending June 30, 1914. Washington, D.C.: Government Printing Office, 1914.
- Crompton, Samuel Etinde. The Sinking of the USS Maine: Declaring War Against Spain. New York: Chelsea House Publishers, 2009.
- Cutler, Thomas J. A Sailor's History of the U.S. Navy. Annapolis, Md.: Naval Institute Press, 2005.
- de la Cova, Antonio Rafael. Cuban Confederate Colonel: The Life of Ambrosio José Gonzales. Columbia, S.C.: University of South Carolina Press, 2003.
- Drew, Dennis M. and Snow, Donald M. The Eagle's Talons: The American Experience at War. Maxwell Air Force Base, Montgomery, Ala.: Air University Press, 1988.
- Dunlap, Annette B. "William McKinley." In Chronology of the U.S. Presidency. Volume 3. Mathew Manweller, ed. Santa Barbara, Calif.: ABC-CLIO, 2012.
- Ferguson, James. Traveler's History: The Caribbean. Northampton, Mass.: Interlink Books, 2008.
- Franklin, Jane. The Cuban Revolution and the United States: A Chronological History. 2d exp. ed. Melbourne, Vic.: Ocean Press, 1995.
- Gardiner, Robert. Warship. London: Conway Maritime Press, 1992.
- Goettel, Elinor. Eagle of the Philippines: President Manuel Quezon. New York: J. Messner, 1970.
- Gould, Lewis L. "William McKinley." In The American Presidents: Critical Essays. Melvin I. Urofsky, ed. Florence, Ky.: Taylor & Francis, 2000.
- Gurney, Gene and Wise, Harold. Arlington National Cemetery: A Picture Story of America's Most Famous Burial Grounds From the Civil War to President John F. Kennedy's Burial. New York: Crown Publishers, 1965.
- Hazen, Walter A. Everyday Life: Reconstruction to 1900. Glenview, Ill.: Good Year Books, 1999.
- Hendrickson, Kenneth Elton. The Spanish–American War. Westport, Conn.: Greenwood Press, 2003.
- Holt, Dean W. American Military Cemeteries. Jefferson, N.C.: McFarland & Co., Publishers, 2010.
- Housenick, Christopher C. "Cuba." In Defense and Security: A Compendium of National Armed Forces and Security Policies. Karl R. DeRouen and Heo, Uk, eds. Santa Barbara, Calif.: ABC-CLIO, 2005.
- Hughes, Holly; Murphy, Sylvia; Flippin, Alexis Lipsitz; and Duchaine, Julie. Frommer's 500 Extraordinary Islands. Hoboken, N.J.: John Wiley & Sons, 2010.
- Hunt, Geoffrey. Colorado's Volunteer Infantry in the Philippine Wars, 1898–1899. Albuquerque: University of New Mexico Press, 2006.
- Johnson, Chalmers. The Sorrows of Empire: Militarism, Secrecy, and the End of the Republic. New York: Macmillan, 2007.
- Kachur, Matthew and Sterngass, Jon. Spanish Settlement in North America. New York: Infobase Publishing, 2009.
- Keith, June. June Keith's Key West and the Florida Keys. Key West, Fla.: Palm Island Press, 1999.
- LaRosa, Michael and Mejia, Germán P. The United States Discovers Panama: The Writings of Soldiers, Scholars, Scientists, and Scoundrels, 1850–1905. Lanham, Md.: Rowman & Littlefield, 2004.
- Lauderbaugh, George M. "USS Maine." In Iberia and the Americas: Culture, Politics, and History: A Multidisciplinary Encyclopedia. Michael J. Francis, ed. Santa Barbara, Calif.: ABC-CLIO, 2005.
- Lemos, Kate; Morrison, William; Warren, Charles D.; and Hewitt, Mark Alan. Carrere & Hastings, Architects. Woodbridge, Suffolk, UK: Acanthus Press, 2006.
- Limburg, Peter. Deep-Sea Detectives: Maritime Mysteries and Forensic Science. Bloomington, Ind.: iUniverse, 2005.
- Mack, William P.; Connell, Royal W.; and Lovette, L.P. Naval Ceremonies, Customs, and Traditions.. Annapolis, Md.: Naval Institute Press, 1983.
- Magoon, Charles E. "Report of the Provisional Governor of Cuba From December 1, 1907, to December 1, 1908." Doc. 1457. House Documents. Vol. 147. 60th Cong., 2d sess. Washington, D.C.: Government Printing Office, 1909.
- Marley, David. Wars of the Americas: A Chronology of Armed Conflict in the Western Hemisphere, 1492 to the Present. Santa Barbara, Calif.: ABC-CLIO, 2008.
- McCaffrey, James M. Inside the Spanish–American War: A History Based on First-Person Accounts. Jefferson, N.C.: McFarland & Co., 2009.
- McIver, Stuart. Touched By the Sun. Sarasota, Fla.: Pineapple Press, 2008.
- McNeese, Tim and Jensen, Richard. The New South and the Old West, 1866–1890. New York: Chelsea House, 2010.
- Miller, Mark and Propert, Mark. National Geographic Traveler: Miami and the Keys. Washington, D.C.: National Geographic, 2012.
- Morris, James M. and Kearns, Patricia M. Historical Dictionary of the United States Navy. Lanham, Md.: Scarecrow Press, 2011.
- Murray, Stuart. Atlas of American Military History. New York: Facts On File, 2005.
- National Capital Planning Commission. Federal Capital Improvements Program for the National Capital Region. Washington, D.C.: National Capital Planning Commission, 1995.
- Navarro, Sharon Ann and Mejia, Armando Xavier, eds. Latino Americans and Political Participation: A Reference Handbook. Santa Barbara, Calif.: ABC-CLIO, 2004.
- Nichols, Christopher McKnight. Promise and Peril: America at the Dawn of a Global Age. Cambridge, Mass.: Harvard University Press, 2011.
- Ochoa, George and Smith, Carter. Atlas of Hispanic-American History. Rev. ed. New York: Facts On File, 2009.
- Olson, Lynne Those Angry Days: Roosevelt, Lindbergh, and America's Fight Over World War II, 1939–1941. New York: Random House, 2013.
- Pabico, Rufino C. The Exiled Government: The Philippine Commonwealth in the United States During the Second World War. Amherst, N.Y: Humanity Books, 2006.
- Paine, Lincoln P. Warships of the World to 1900. Boston: Houghton Mifflin, 2000.
- Paterson, Thomas; Clifford, John G.; and Kagan, Kenneth J. American Foreign Relations: A History Since 1895. Boston: Houghton Mifflin Co., 2000.
- Pepper, Charles Melville. Every-Day Life in Washington. New York: The Christian Herald, 1900.
- Peters, James Edward. Arlington National Cemetery, Shrine to America's Heroes. 2d ed. Bethesda, Md.: Woodbine House, 2000.
- Piehler, G. Kurt. Remembering War the American Way. Washington, D.C.: Smithsonian Institution Press, 1995.
- "Report of the Chief of Engineers, U.S. Army, 1917." In Annual Reports, War Department. Fiscal Year Ended June 30, 1917. Washington, D.C.: Government Printing Office, 1917.
- "Report of the Chief of the Quartermaster Corps to the Secretary of War, 1913." In Annual Reports, War Department. Fiscal Year Ending June 30, 1913. Washington, D.C.: Government Printing Office, 1913.
- "Report of the Quartermaster General." War Department Annual Reports, 1912. Vol. 1 Washington, D.C.: Government Printing Office, 1912.
- Rice, Earle. The Cuban Revolution. San Diego, Calif.: Lucent Books, 1995.
- Søreide, Fredrik. Ships From the Depths: Deepwater Archaeology. College Station, Tex.: Texas A&M University Press, 2011.
- Special Board of Engineer Officers. Final Report of Removing Wreck of Battleship "Maine" From Harbor of Habana, Cuba. Doc. No. 480. 63rd Cong., 2d sess. Washington, D.C.: Government Printing Office, 1914.
- Starr-LeBeau, Gretchen D.; Kross, Jessica; and Allison, Robert J. American Eras: Development of the Industrial United States, 1878–1899. Volume 6. Detroit: Gale Research, 1997.
- Staten, Clifford L. The History of Cuba. Westport, Conn.: Greenwood Press, 2003.
- Stewart-Jones, Mark. A Difficult Age. Bloomington, Ind.: AuthorHouse, 2010.
- Subcommittee of the Committee on Appropriations. Military Construction, Veterans Affairs, and Related Agencies Appropriations for 2009. Committee on Appropriations. U.S. House of Representatives. 110th Cong., 2d sess. Washington, D.C.: U.S. Government Printing Office, 2008.
- Tucker, Spencer. A Global Chronology of Conflict: From the Ancient World to the Modern Middle East. Santa Barbara, Calif.: ABC-CLIO, 2010.
- Vogel, Steve. The Pentagon: A History. New York: Random House, 2008.
- Youngblood, Norman. The Development of Mine Warfare: A Most Murderous and Barbarous Conduct. Westport, Conn.: Praeger Security International, 2006.
- Yzaguirre, Raúl. "Liberty and Justice for All: Civil Rights in the Years Ahead." In Latinos and the Nation's Future. Henry Cisneros and John Rosales, eds. Houston, Tex: Arte Publico Press, 2009.
