= Chesapeake, Northampton County, Virginia =

City in Virginia, US

Coordinates: 37°18′28″N 75°57′07″W

Chesapeake is an unincorporated community in Northampton County, Virginia, United States.

== Geography ==
Chesapeake is located at latitude 37.308 and longitude −75.952. The elevation is 36 feet (11 m).
