= USS Chesapeake (ID-3395) =

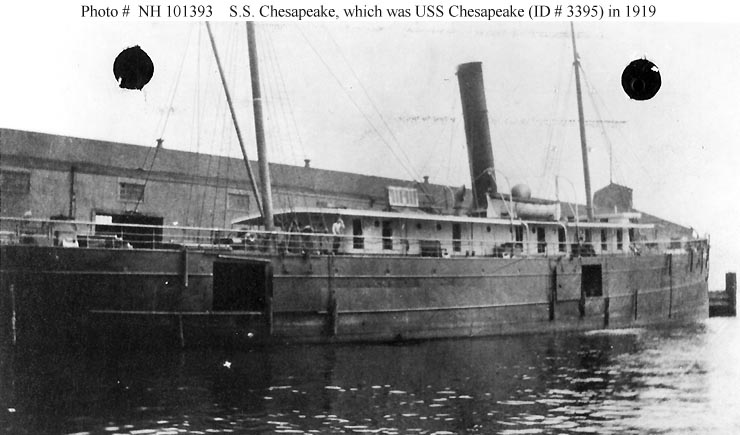
- USS Chesapeake (ID-3395)Cargo ship SS Chesapeake at New York City sometime prior to her 1919 U.S. Navy service as salvage ship USS Chesapeake (ID-3395), possibly at the time of her inspection by the 3rd Naval District on 28 March 1918

History

United States
- Name: USS Chesapeake
- Namesake: Previous name retained
- Builder: Harlan and Hollingsworth, Wilmington, Delaware
- Launched: 1900
- Acquired: 31 August 1918
- Commissioned: 22 March 1919
- Decommissioned: 25 October 1919
- Fate: Sold at Brest, France, sometime after decommissioning
- Notes: Served as commercial cargo ship SS Chesapeake until 1918

General characteristics
- Type: Salvage ship
- Tonnage: 1,101 Gross register tons
- Displacement: 2,000 tons
- Length: 220 ft (67 m)
- Beam: 32 ft (9.8 m)
- Draft: 12 ft (3.7 m) mean
- Propulsion: Steam engine
- Speed: 12 knots
- Complement: 117
- Armament: 1 × 3-inch (76.2-millimeter) gun

The third USS Chesapeake (ID-3395) was a United States Navy salvage ship in commission from March to October 1919.

SS Chesapeake was built in 1900 as a commercial cargo ship at Wilmington, Delaware, by Harlan and Hollingsworth. The U.S. Navy's Third Naval District inspected her at New York City on 28 March 1918 for possible World War I service. The Navy purchased her on 31 August 1918, assigned her Identification Number (Id. No.) 3395, fitted her out at New York City as a salvage ship, and commissioned her as USS Chesapeake on 22 March 1919.

Chesapeake departed New York on 12 May 1919 bound for Brest, France, where she joined the First Salvage Division supporting U.S. Naval Forces Operating in European Waters, caring for the many ships engaged in supporting the Army of Occupation and other post-World War I American military activities in Europe. In August 1919 nshe joined the force clearing the North Sea of the North Sea Mine Barrage, the vast minefields laid during World War I, in an operation almost as intricate and dangerous as the original minelaying had been. Chesapeake ferried various minesweeping equipment and supplies from Brest and Liverpool, England, to Kirkwall in the Orkney Islands, where the minesweeping operations were based.

Chesapeake was decommissioned at Brest on 25 October 1919 and later sold there to a British salvage firm.
