= Spanish–American War Memorial =

Spanish–American War Memorial may refer to:

- California Volunteers (sculpture), also known as the Spanish–American War Memorial, San Francisco, California, U.S.
- Soldiers' and Sailors' Monument (Indianapolis), Indiana, U.S.
- Spanish–American War Memorial (Arlington National Cemetery), Virginia, U.S.
- Spanish–American War Memorial (Columbus, Ohio), U.S.
- Spanish–American War Nurses Memorial, Arlington National Cemetery, Virginia, U.S.
- Spanish–American War Soldier, Milwaukee, Wisconsin, U.S.
- Spanish–American War Soldier's Monument, Portland, Oregon, U.S.
- Spanish–American War Veterans Memorial, Portland, Oregon, U.S.

== See also ==
- List of Spanish–American War monuments and memorials
