= List of Spanish–American War monuments and memorials =

This is a list of monuments and memorials that were established as public displays and symbols of the Spanish–American War of 1898.

== Monument Movement ==
Quickly after the end of the Spanish American War organizations dedicated to the memory of the Spanish American War and its veterans began to form. The United Spanish War Veterans was one of such organization that became the dominant association for Spanish American War veterans. Later a womans auxiliary made up of wives, daughters, and granddaughters was also created which was known as the Auxiliary Spanish War Veterans.

As the United Spanish War Veterans organization and their auxiliary grew so did the number of monuments and memorials to the Spanish American War. It soon then became a mission for many of the Camps to erect at least one monument in their locality.

When the United Spanish War Veterans then disbanded their successors, Sons of Spanish American War Veterans, then took on their mission of not only the remembrance of said veterans but also in erecting monuments and memorials to the Spanish American War.

== Monument and Memorial Removal ==
Recently monuments and memorials and famous figures of such war have been the target of removal and destruction. Often time localities or individuals cite colonialism or imperialism as reasons for why such memorials should be removed.

== List of Removals ==
- USWV Aston Park Memorial, Asheville, North Carolina - Removed May, 2023
- Volunteer Park Memorial, Seattle, Washington - Removed August, 2021
- Theodore Roosevelt Equestrian Monument, Portland, Oregon - Toppled October 11, 2020
- Lone Fir Cemetery Spanish American War Memorial, Portland, Oregon - Toppled November, 2020
- Theodore Roosevelt Equestrian Statue of the Natural History Museum, New York City, New York - Removed January, 2022
- Fitzhugh Lee Spanish American War Memorial, Richmond, Virginia - Removed July, 2020
- John B. Castleman Monument Spanish American War Officer, Louisville, Kentucky - Removed June 8, 2020
- Dewey Arch, Manhattan, New York - Removed 1900

== Cuba ==
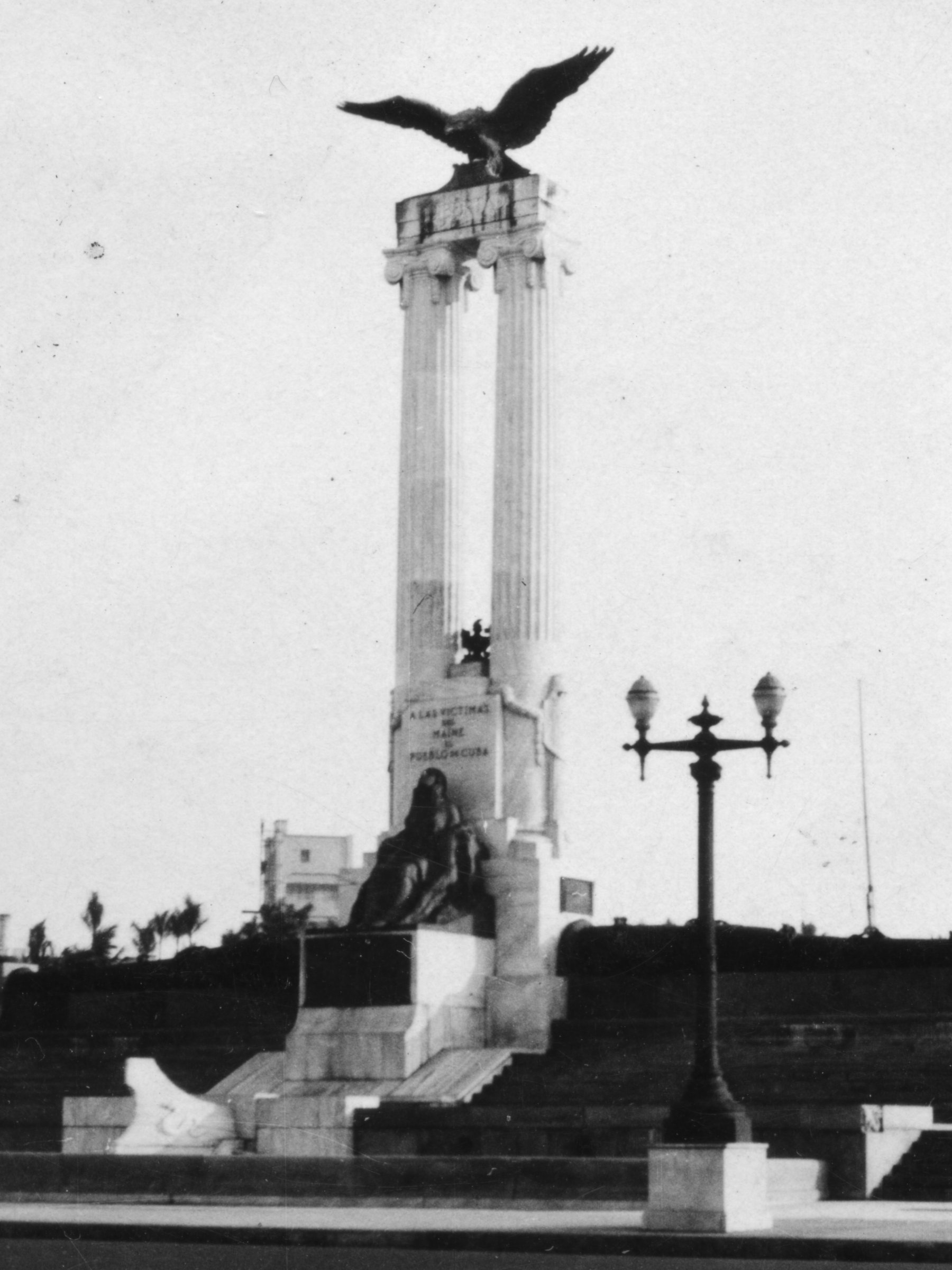
Monument to Victims of the Maine, in 1930

There have been numerous memorials to the war in Cuba, including sites preserved by engineers right after the war and numerous monuments that have been preserved by Cuba to this day, although few Americans have been able to visit since U.S. banned travel to Cuba in 1963.

- Monument to Victims of the Maine, Havana, inaugurated March 8, 1925. Created by Cuban architect Félix Cabarrocas and Spanish sculptor Moisés de Huerta; included two marble columns and two allegorical figures representing fraternity between the Republic of Cuba and the United States. The monument was "decapitated" by removal of the eagle atop the columns in 1961 after the Cuban Revolution when relations with the U.S. deteriorated.
- Other Havana memorials included busts of Theodore Roosevelt, William McKinley, and Leonard Wood (military governor of Cuba).
- Monument to 71st New York at San Juan Hill, San Juan Hill
- Monumento en Playa de Daiquiri, Santiago de Cuba

== Puerto Rico ==
See Puerto Rican Campaign#Markers, monuments and tombstones

== Spain ==
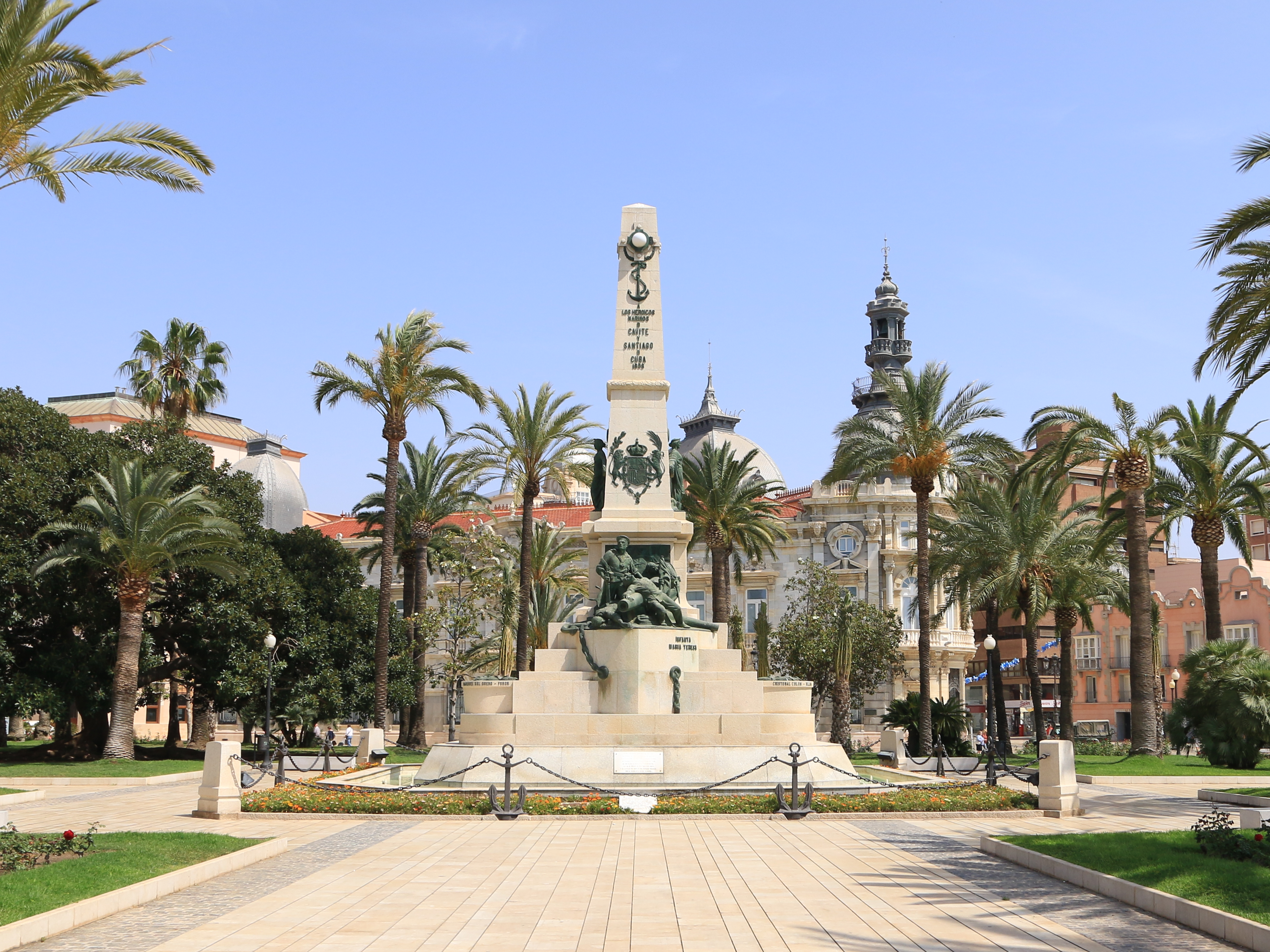
Monument of the heroes of Santiago de Cuba and Cavite - Cartagena

- Monumento a Vara de Rey, Madrid a monument to General Joaquín Vara del Rey y Rubio, who led Spanish forces against overwhelming odds at the Battle of El Caney.
- Monument to Vara de Rey, Ibiza
- Monumento a los Héroes de Cavite y Santiago, in Cartagena, a monument to the heroes of the naval battles of Santiago de Cuba and Cavite (Battle of Manila Bay)
- Monument to the repatriated soldiers of Cuba and the Philippines who died in the city of Vigo in 1898, La Cruz Roja de Vigo in Pereiró Cemetery.

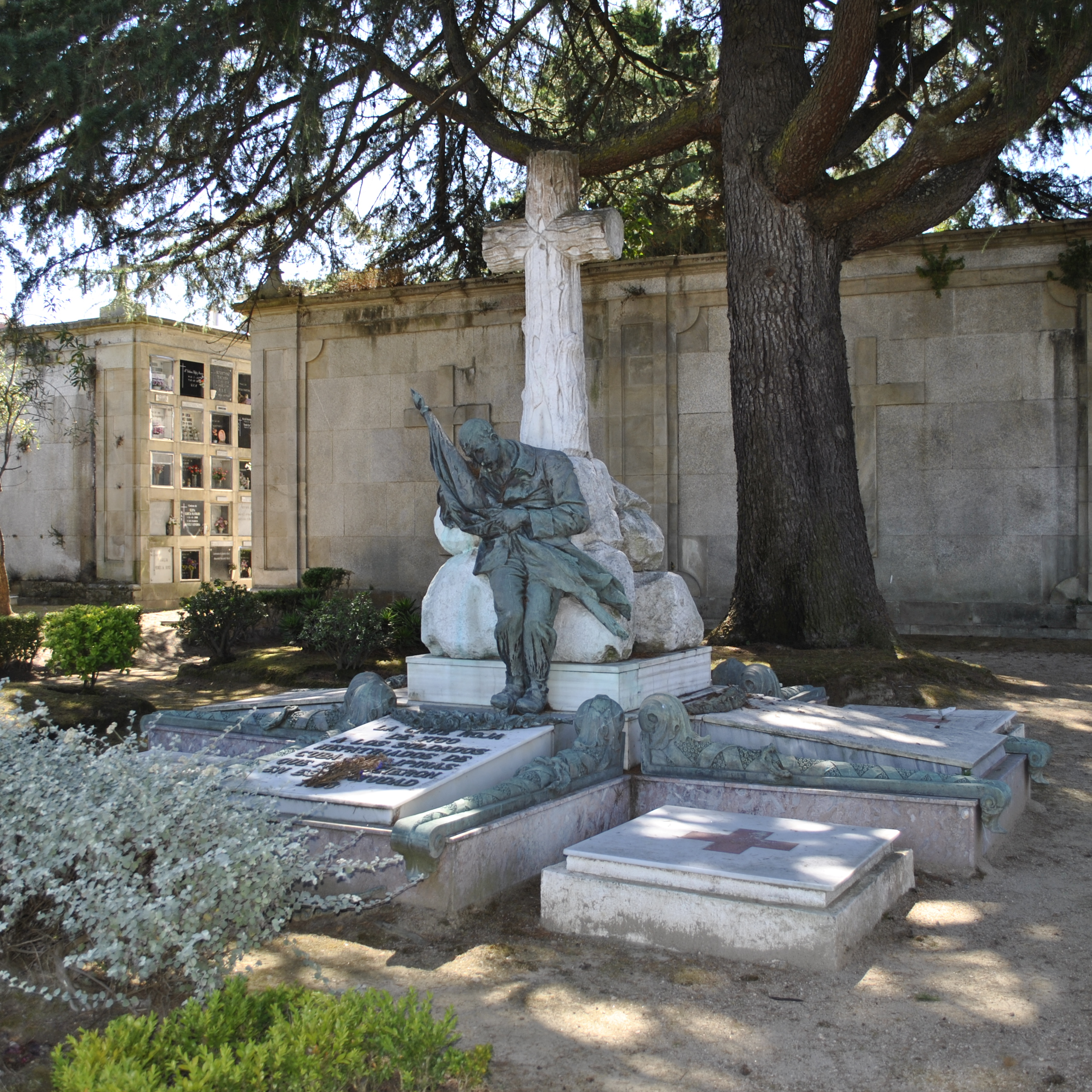
The Red Cross of Vigo to the repatriated soldiers of Cuba and the Philippines.

== United States ==
=== Puerto Rico ===
Puerto Rico became part of the U.S. as a result of the war, and the Puerto Rican Campaign, within the Caribbean theatre of the war, included a land invasion in the south on July 25, 1898, which ended August 13, when the armistice ending the war was signed.

- El monumento en Guánica a los veteranos de la Guerra Hispano Americana, Guánica, erected in 1938.
- Yauco Battle Site, site of the July 25–26, 1898 Battle of Yauco, the first major engagement of the campaign, was listed on the U.S. National Register of Historic Places in 2008.

=== Arizona ===
- Bucky O'Neill Monument, Courthouse Plaza, Prescott, AZ
- Spanish War Veterans Monument, Tucson, AZ
- In Memory of All Spanish American War Veterans Plaque, Fountain Hills, AZ
- GAR & USWV "United Spanish War Veterans" Stone Column, Globe, AZ
- 125th Anniversary of the Spanish-American War Monument, Miami, AZ
- Soldiers of 1898-1902 Memorial Bench, Sharlot Hall Museum, Prescott, AZ
- Spanish American War Veterans of Cochise County Plaque, Bisbee, AZ
- Sailors of the USS Maine Sailors Plaque, Parks, AZ

=== Arkansas ===
- "The Boys of 1898", Spanish–American War memorial at MacArthur Park, Little Rock

=== California ===
- California Volunteers, also known as the Spanish–American War Memorial, San Francisco
- "Spanish American War Memorial", Oakland
- Spanish–American War Memorial, 7th Regiment Monument, Pershing Square, Los Angeles
  - This is the oldest work of public art in the City of Los Angeles, completed in 1900. It is designated as Los Angeles Cultural Heritage Monument No. 480).
- The Hiker statue (1949), Capitol Park, Sacramento.

=== District of Columbia ===
- Cuban Friendship Urn, Washington D.C.

=== Georgia ===
- Spanish American War Memorial, Augusta

=== Illinois ===
- Memorial Hall
- "Spanish–American War Memorial", Springfield
- Spanish American War Veterans Monument, City Park, Geneseo, Illinois

=== Iowa ===
- Veterans Memorial Building

=== Indiana ===
- Soldiers' and Sailors' Monument, Indianapolis

=== Louisiana ===
- The Hiker, Spanish American War Monument,
- "Spanish–American War Memorial", City Park, Baton Rouge

=== Maine ===
- "Spanish-American War Monument", Monument Park, Houlton

=== Maryland ===
- Spanish American War Monument & Cannons, Hagerstown

=== Massachusetts ===
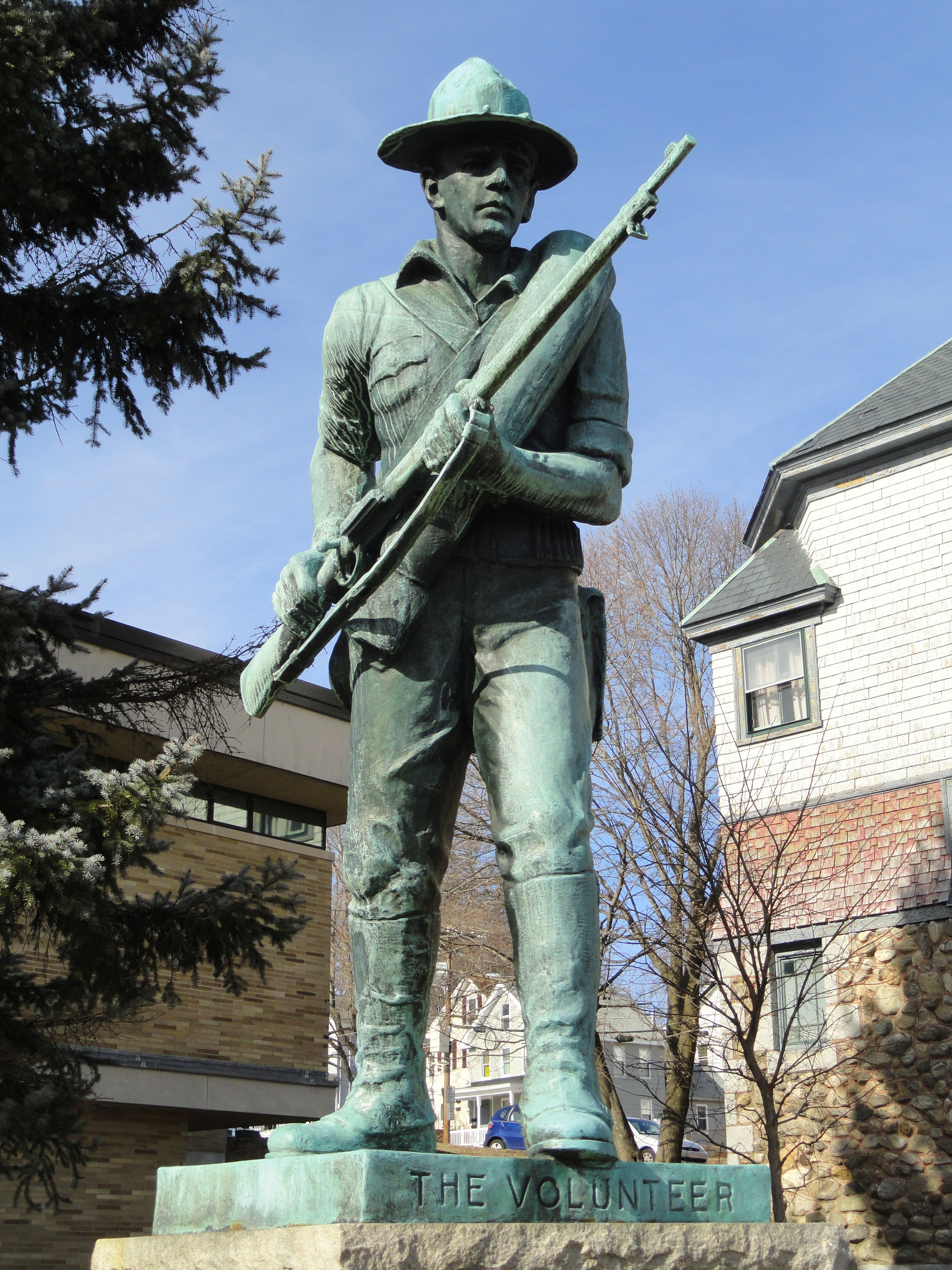
The Volunteer - an infantryman with his rifle held at the ready position.

- "The Volunteer", Marlborough
- "Spanish American War Memorial", Concord
- "Spanish–American War Memorial", Springfield

=== Michigan ===
- Spanish American War Memorial, Belle Isle, Detroit, dedicated in 1932

=== Mississippi ===
- "Spanish–American War Memorial", War Memorial Building, Jackson
- "Soldiers Monument", Louisville

=== Montana ===
- Spanish American War Veteran Memorial 1908, Butte
- Spanish American War Men and Woman Memorial 1999, Butte

=== New Hampshire ===
- "Spanish War Veterans 1898-1902", Manchester

=== New Jersey ===
- Spanish American War Memorial, Morristown

=== New York ===
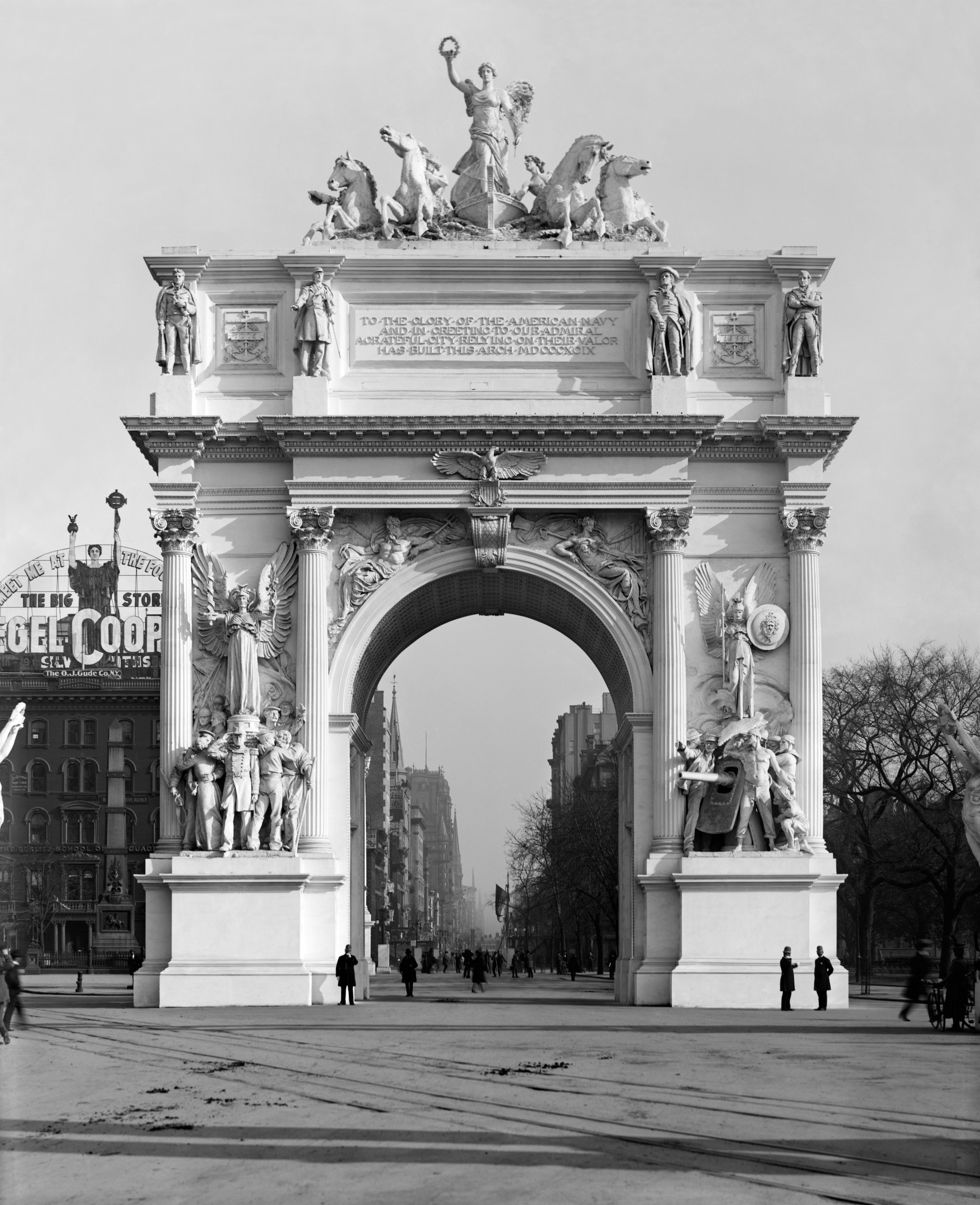
Dewey Arch

- Dewey Arch, triumphal arch honoring Admiral George Dewey which stood at Madison Square Park from 1899 to 1900. The monument was removed as it began to deteriorate since the memorial was only meant to be temporary and thus was constructed with wood and plaster.
- Spanish American War Monument to the 71st Infantry Regiment, Mount Hope Cemetery, Rochester
- Spanish–American War Monument in honor of those who served in the City of Rochester and Monroe County, Rochester Community War Memorial Terrace

=== North Carolina ===
- USWV Aston Park Memorial, Asheville "Removed May of 2023"

=== Ohio ===
- Dayton Memorial Hall

=== Oklahoma ===
- Veteran's Park Spanish American War Memorial, Tulsa

=== Oregon ===
- Fountain for Company H, Portland
- Spanish–American War Soldier's Monument, Portland
- Spanish–American War Veterans Memorial, Portland
- Theodore Roosevelt Memorial, Portland

=== Rhode Island ===
- "Spanish American War Memorial", Woonsocket, Rhode Island
- The Hiker, Spanish American War Monument

=== South Carolina ===
- Spanish–American War Monument, State House Grounds, Columbia

=== Texas ===
- Spanish–American War Memorial, City Hall, Wichita Falls
- The Hiker, Spanish American War Monument, Austin

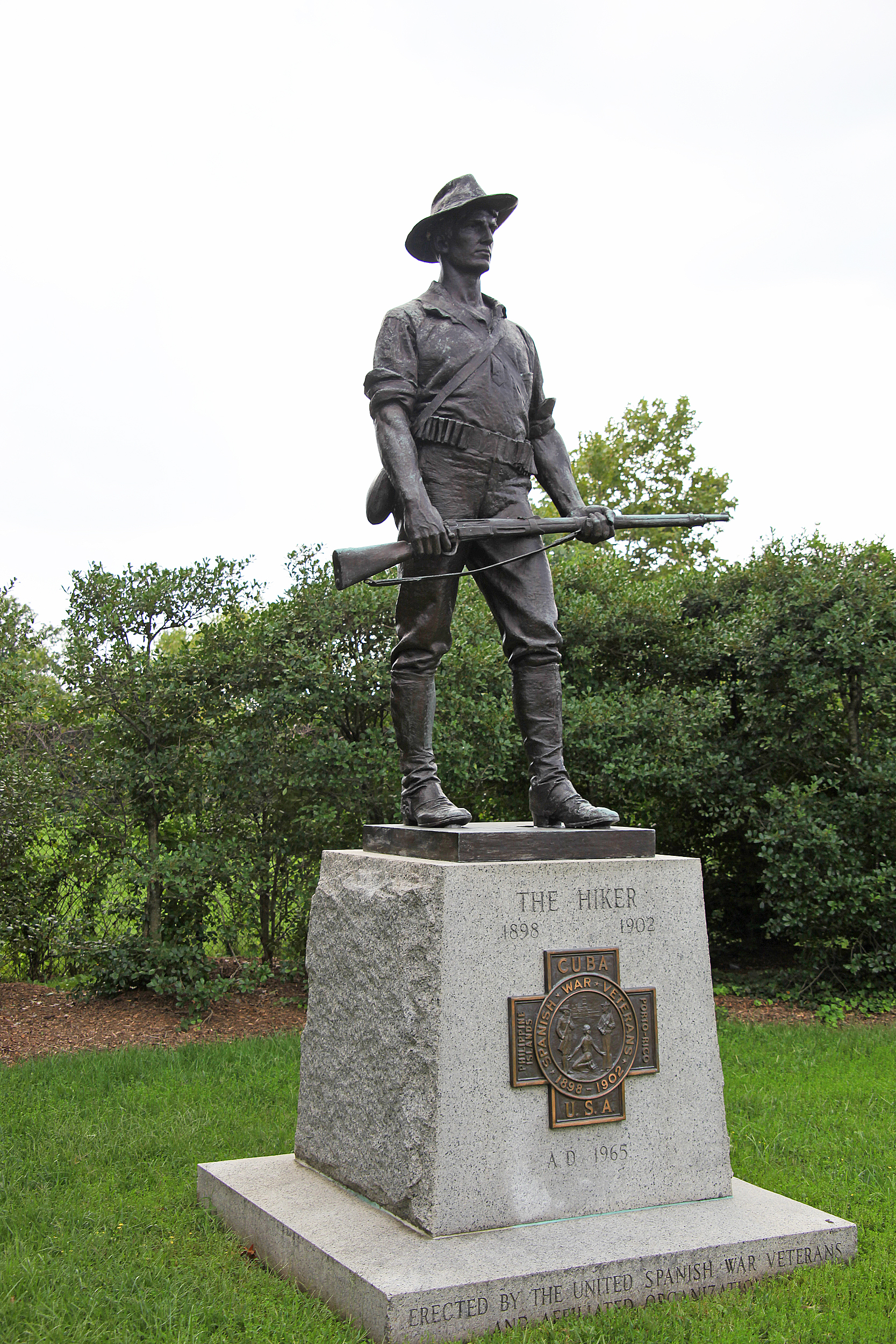
The Hiker along Memorial Drive on the way to Arlington National Cemetery.

=== Utah ===
- Remember the Maine Park and Rock Mural, Maeser

=== Virginia ===
- Spanish–American War Memorial (Arlington National Cemetery), Virginia
- Spanish–American War Nurses Memorial, Arlington National Cemetery, Virginia
- Rough Riders Memorial, Arlington National Cemetery, Virginia
- The Hiker, a memorial to the veterans of the Spanish-American War and the Philippine Insurrection located along Memorial Drive or the Avenue of Heroes, the approach to Arlington National Cemetery.
- The Hiker, Portsmouth, Virginia

=== Washington ===
- Spanish American War Memorial Obelisk, Port Orchard, Washington
- Volunteer Park Memorial, Seattle, Washington "Removed"

=== Wisconsin ===
- Spanish–American War Soldier, Milwaukee, Wisconsin
