= Fountain for Company H =

1914 fountain and war memorial in Portland, Oregon

- Second Oregon Company Volunteers
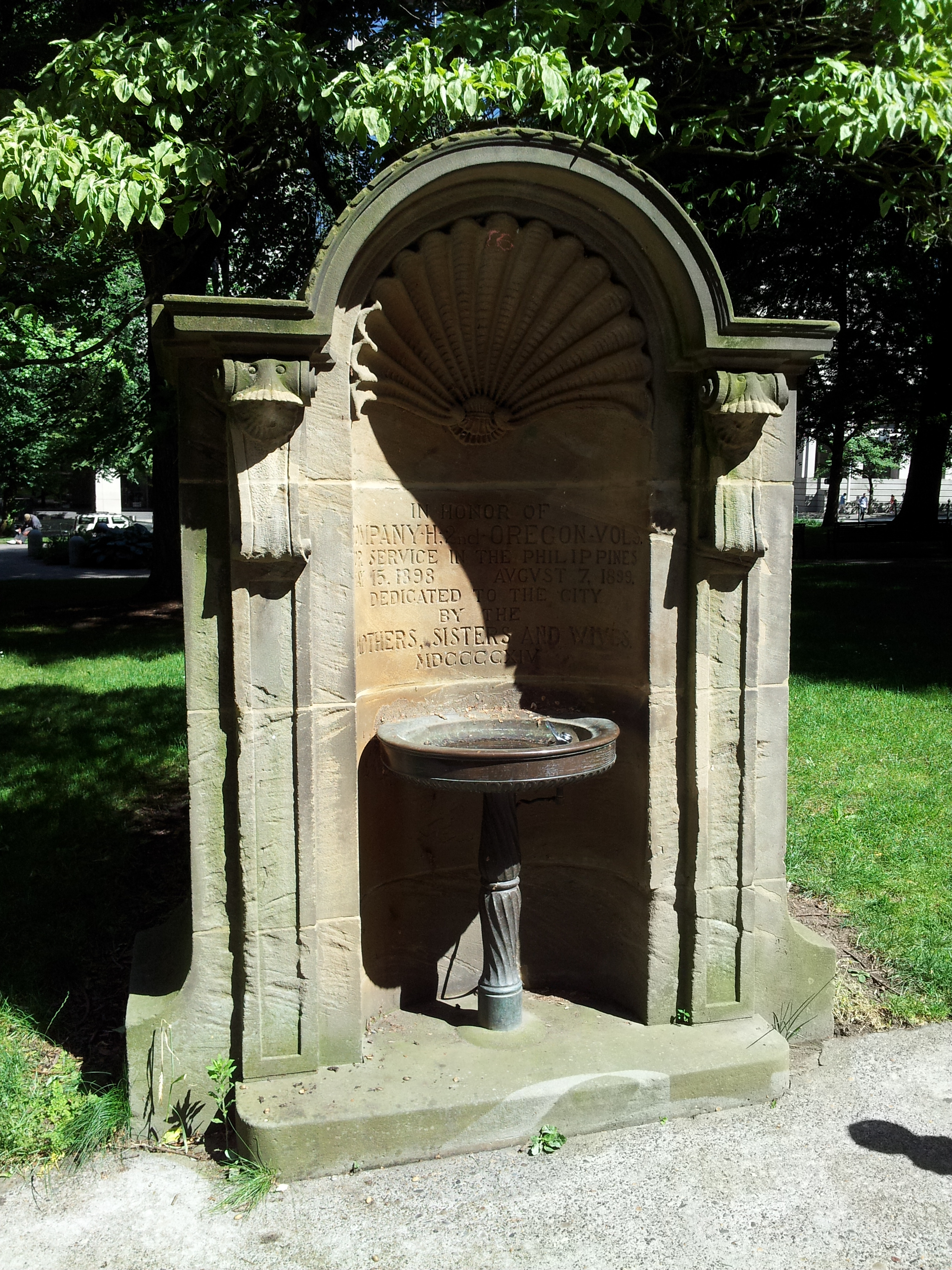
- The fountain in 2015
- Artist: John H. Beaver
- Year: 1914
- Type: Fountain; sculpture; war memorial
- Medium: Limestone; bronze
- Dimensions: 2.3 m × 1.6 m × 0.79 m (89 in × 63 in × 31 in)
- Location: Portland, Oregon, United States; 45.51617°N 122.67777°W
- Owner: City of Portland and Multnomah County Public Art Collection courtesy of the Regional Arts & Culture Council

Fountain for Company H, also known as Second Oregon Company Volunteers, is a 1914 fountain and war memorial designed by John H. Beaver, installed in Portland, Oregon's Plaza Blocks, in the United States. Dedicated to the men of Company H of the 2nd Oregon Volunteer Infantry Regiment killed in service during the Spanish–American War, the limestone and bronze memorial was installed in Lownsdale Square in 1914. It is part of the City of Portland and Multnomah County Public Art Collection courtesy of the Regional Arts & Culture Council. The memorial has been included in published walking tours of Portland.

== Description ==
The limestone and bronze memorial is installed on the west side of Lownsdale Square, facing the Multnomah County Courthouse along Southwest 4th Avenue between Main and Salmon Streets, in Downtown Portland's Plaza Blocks. It features a drinking fountain within a clamshell-shaped canopy and measures approximately 89 x 63 x 31 in. The memorial commemorates the men of Company H of the 2nd Oregon Volunteer Infantry Regiment killed in the Philippines during the Spanish–American War. An inscription on the west side reads:

IN HONOR OF
COMPANY H 2ND OREGON VOLS.
FOR SERVICE IN THE PHILIPPINES
MAY 15, 1898 AUGUST 7, 1899.
DEDICATED TO THE CITY
BY THE
MOTHERS, SISTERS AND WIVES.
MDCCCCXIV

== History ==
=== Design selection and unveiling ===
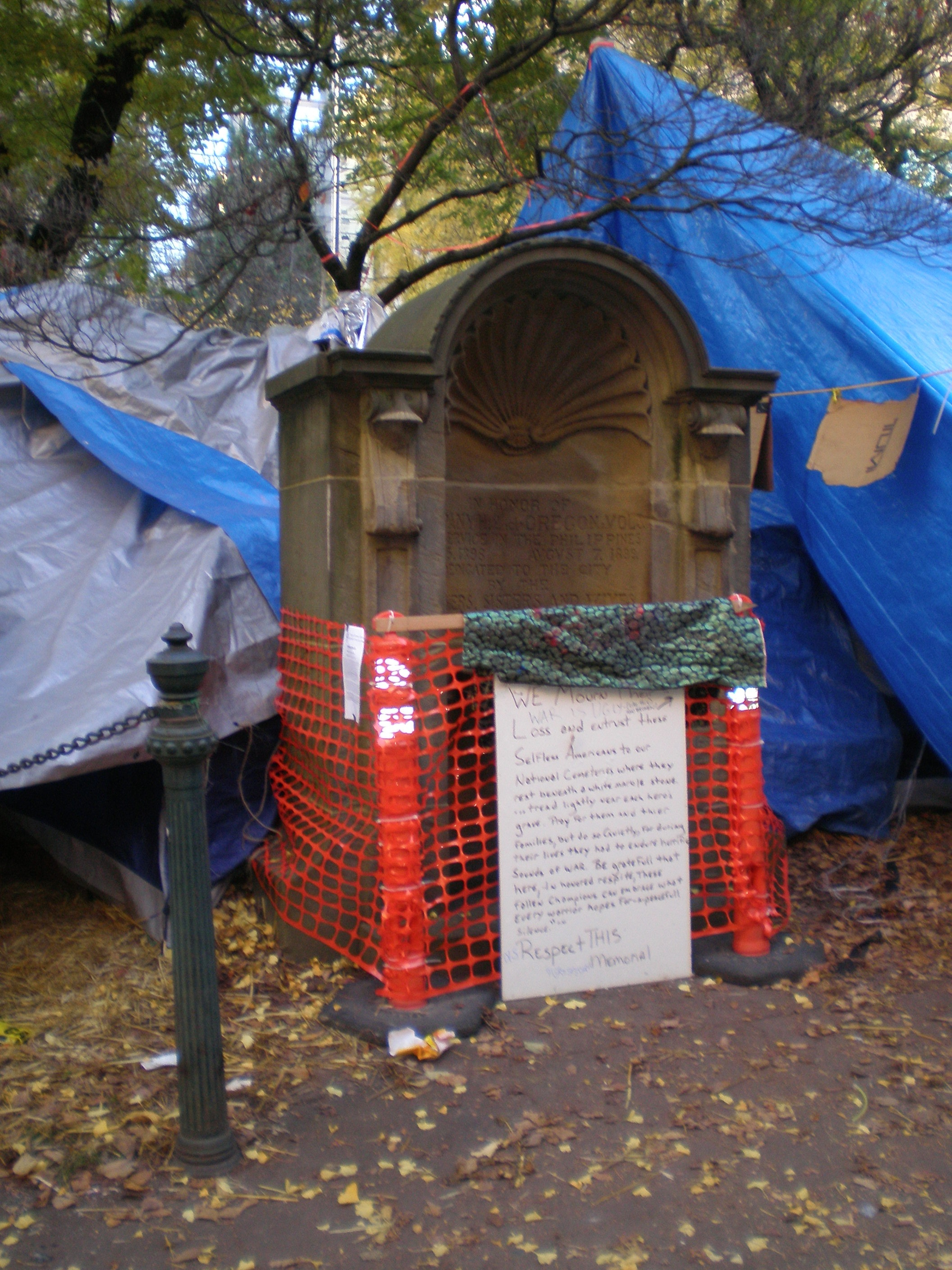
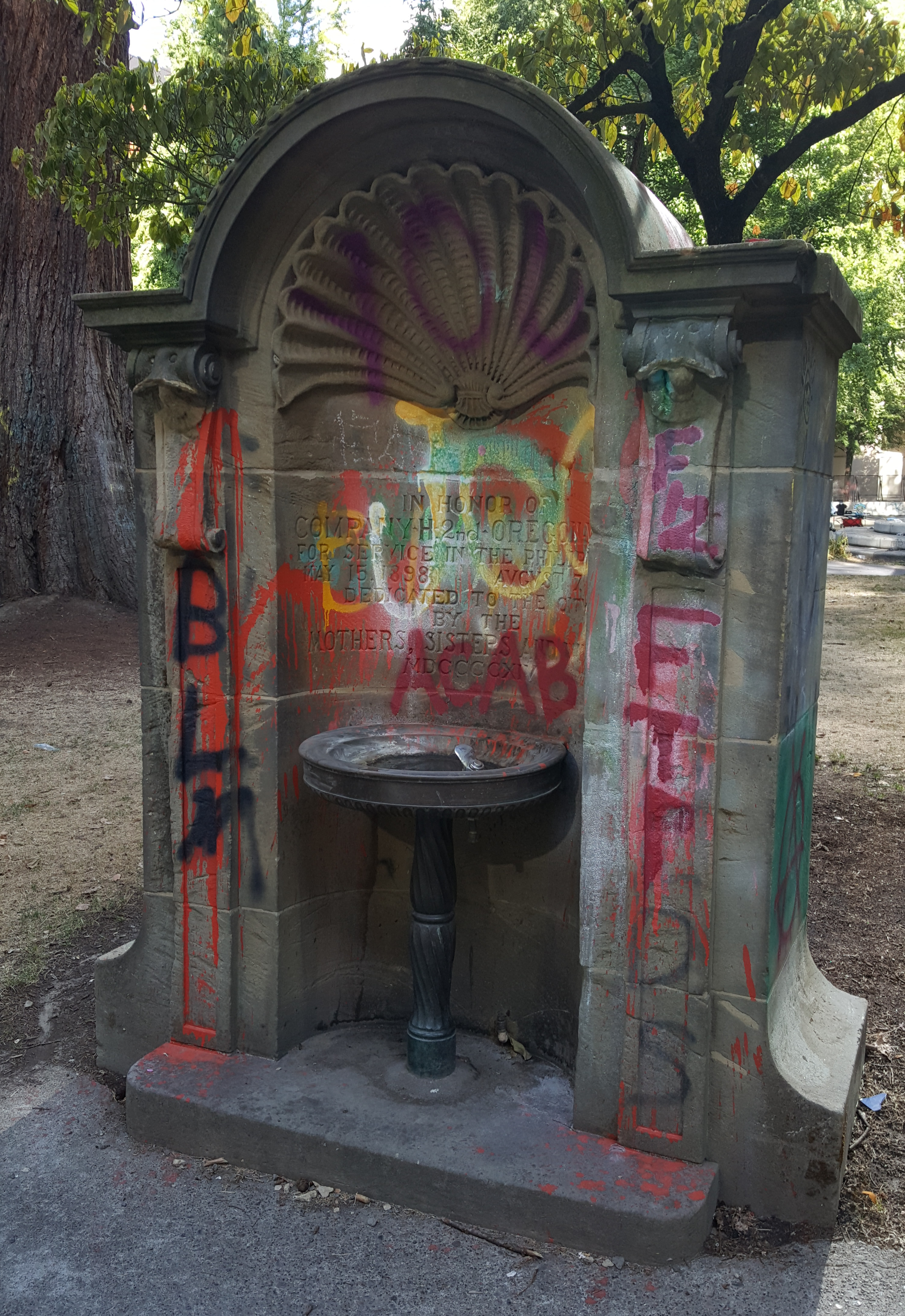
The memorial during Occupy Portland in 2011 (top) and the George Floyd protests in 2020 (bottom)

The memorial was gifted by an auxiliary group of women relatives (mostly mothers) of the men in Company H, who held meetings to organize the effort and raise funds. To select a design, a city competition was announced in January 1914, with $450 appropriated for a fountain "to be executed in bronze and stone"; contestants were required to submit "front and side elevations, section and plan" using "simple monotone wash renderings or pen and ink". On February 13, an auxiliary meeting was held for "all present members and all women who joined at the time of the close of the war or since that time... whether they are members now or not", so final arrangements could be made. Beaver's design was chosen by a committee under city commissioner William L. Brewster on February 17, earning the artist a $50 prize.

The fountain was erected by August 30, and unveiled on September 2. Henrietta White, great-granddaughter of the auxiliary's first president Diana McDonell, unveiled the fountain by removing a flag presented to the company by girls from Portland High School. The program included: a speech by Colonel Charles E. McDonell, a captain in the company who served as chairman of the ceremony and described the history and activities of the auxiliary; a poem written by auxiliary member June McMillan Ordway and read by Josephine Burns Hoben; the drum corps of the Sons of Spanish–American War Veterans; and an opening prayer and closing benediction by Reverend C. E. Cline. Brewster accepted the memorial on behalf of mayor H. Russell Albee and the city, and the program ended with the singing of "America".

=== Subsequent maintenance ===
The fountain was surveyed by the Smithsonian Institution's "Save Outdoor Sculpture!" program in 1993.

During Occupy Portland (2011), the fountain was screened off and displayed a sign reading "Please respect this fragile monument". Keith Lachowicz, the Regional Arts & Culture Council's art collections manager, assessed the memorial's condition multiple times during the demonstration, along with the nearby monuments Thompson Elk Fountain (1900), Spanish–American War Soldier's Monument (1906), and The Promised Land (1993). He said the war memorials sustained graffiti, which was removed by veterans within the group of occupiers, and confirmed all the public artworks on the site had received no major damage, as of late November. The screen had to be replaced by the city once after being removed. Lachowicz said of the protesters: "We had some very interesting philosophical debates about war monuments, but they ended up being pretty respectful."

The memorial is part of the City of Portland and Multnomah County Public Art Collection courtesy of the Regional Arts & Culture Council.

== See also ==
- 1914 in art
- List of Spanish–American War monuments and memorials
- Spanish–American War Veterans Memorial, River View Cemetery
