= The Hiker (Kitson) =

Statue by Theo Alice Ruggles Kitson

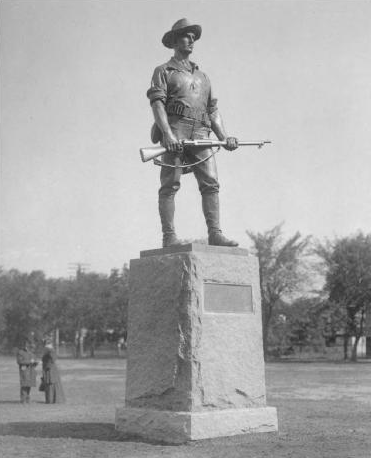
The original, at the University of Minnesota, in Minneapolis, in 1906.

The Hiker is a bronze statue created by Theo Alice Ruggles Kitson. It commemorates the American soldiers who fought in the Spanish–American War, the Boxer Rebellion, and the Philippine–American War. The first version of it was made for the University of Minnesota in 1906, but at least 50 copies were made, and were erected widely across the United States.

"The Hiker depicts a hero stripped of his parade uniform and shown as a soldier reacting to the challenges of the battlefield."

== Original ==
When she created The Hiker, Kitson already had a reputation for sculpting war memorial statues. For the title of her work, Kitson used the term that American soldiers in both the Spanish–American War and the Philippine–American War gave themselves: "hikers". Leonard Sefing, Jr., a Spanish–American War veteran from Allentown, Pennsylvania, was selected as the model for the statue after a photograph of him was entered into a national contest.

The original statue was unveiled at the University of Minnesota on Memorial Day, 1906. The statue stands in front of the armory at 15 Church Street. Also known as the Student Soldier Memorial, it is a monument to the 218 University of Minnesota students who served in the Spanish–American War. The statue is 9 feet (2.7 m) tall and stands on a 6-foot (1.8 m) granite base, depicting a soldier clad in a period uniform with a campaign hat and a Krag–Jørgensen rifle. Today this statue, now missing the muzzle of the rifle, is popularly known as Iron Mike.

== Locations ==
Kitson's Hikers are attractive corrosion monitors because of their fixed geometry, reasonably consistent alloy chemistry, wide distribution, and long period of exposure.

— "Hiker Study - In Situ Measurement of Long-Term Monumental Bronze Corrosion", 2009

Kitson's work proved to be very popular, largely because of its realism and historical accuracy. In 1921, the Gorham Manufacturing Company, located in Providence, Rhode Island, bought the rights to the statue, and over the next 44 years Gorham cast at least 50 Hiker statues. The earliest installations tended to be in the northeastern United States, with post-World War II statues installed mostly in the South and West.

Because of the wide distribution of the statues, they were used in a 2009 study measuring the effects of air pollution over the last century.

Date	Location	City	State	Coordinates	Unique features	Photo	Ref
1906	In front of the University of Minnesota Armory, facing Church Street	Minneapolis	Minnesota	44°58′37.9″N 93°13′57.82″W	This is the original casting		
1911	Kennedy Plaza	Providence	Rhode Island	41°49′30.66″N 71°24′40.68″W	This Monument Erected by The City of Providence to her sons who on land and sea defended the Nation's honor in the war with Spain, the Insurrection in the Philippines and the China Relief Expedition 1898–1902. Dedicated July 12, 1925 under the aspices of Capt. Allyn K Capron Camp No. 1 and Sidney F. Hoar Camp No. 4 United Spanish War Veterans.		
1921 (May 30)	Central Park located on Monument Hill east of Bradley Boulevard	Schenectady	New York	42.801234°N 73.913602°W	The Hiker statue overlooks Iroquois Lake. Dedicated under the auspices of General Eugene Griffin Camp No 11 United Spanish War Veterans and the Board of Supervisors of Schenectady County. The Hiker was rededicated June 15, 1996.		
1923 (May 30)	Pine Grove Cemetery, 145 Boston Street	Lynn	Massachusetts	42.479618°N 70.960980°W	Freedom – Patriotism – Humanity Erected by the City of Lynn to Commemorating the Valor and Patriotism of the Men of this City who Served in the War with Spain, Philippine Insurrection and China Relief Expedition 1898–1902. Dedicated May 30, 1923 under the Auspices of General Joseph P. Sanger Camp No. 15. United Spanish War Veterans Dept. of Mass.		
1923 (October 21)	Canal Square (formerly known as McKinley Square)	Cohoes	New York	42.774786°N 73.701640°W	Bears the inscription: "To the Men of Cohoes Who Served Their Country, in the War With Spain, The Philippine Campaign and the China Relief Expedition, 1898 and 1902." and containing the names of 203 Cohoes soldiers, sailors and marines.		
1923	Memorial Hall	Dayton	Ohio	39.762983°N 84.189737°W			
1924 (May 17)	Deering Oaks	Portland	Maine	43.657758°N 70.268393°W	In memoriam, United Spanish War Veterans of Cumberland County, 1898–1902		
1924 (May 10)	North-east corner of Bronson Park	Kalamazoo	Michigan	42°17′25.93″N 85°35′6.24″W	The placard on the monument states "Erected by the citizens of Kalamazoo City and County to commemorate the valor and patriotism of those who served in the war with Spain, the Philippine Insurrection and the China Relief Expedition."		
1924 (May 30)	Billings Park, South Salina & South Warren & East Adams Streets	Syracuse	New York	43.042524°N 76.151137°W	Erected by Onondaga County and Col. Butler Camp and Spanish War Veterans. The placard on the monument states "Erected by the County of Onondaga and Colonel John G. Butler Camp, Spanish War Veterans. To the memory of the soldiers and sailors of this country who volunteered and served in the war with Spain, Philippine Insurrection and Boxer Uprising in China. 1924"		
1924 (September 1)	Moran Square	Fitchburg	Massachusetts	42.581808°N 71.790459°W	The placard on the monument states "This Monument Erected by The City of Fitchburg to Commemorate the Valour and Patriotism of the Men who Served in the War with Spain, Philippine Insurrection and China Relief Expedition 1898–1902. Dedicated September 1, 1924 under the Auspices of Guanica Camp No. 9 United Spanish War Veterans."		
1925 (September 19)	Russell Sage College, looking toward Congress Street.	Troy	New York	42.728867°N 73.692755°W	Dedicated under the auspices of Marcus D. Russell Camp No. 2 United Spanish–American War Veterans and the Board of Supervisors of Rensselaer County.		
1925 (November 11)	Lucas County Courthouse	Toledo	Ohio	41.655637°N 83.536840°W			
1926 (October 12)	Located at Main and Common Street	Wakefield	Massachusetts	42.505535°N 71.071812°W	The placard on the monument states, "This Monument Erected by the Town of Wakefield to Commemorate the Valor and Patriotism of the Men of this Town who Served in the War with Spain, Philippine Insurrection and China Relief Expedition 1898–1902. Dedicated October 1, 1926 under the Auspices of Corporal Charles F. Parker Camp No. 39 United Spanish War Veterans Department of Massachusetts."		
1926 (October 24)	Gale Park, Kenoza Avenue & Mill Street	Haverhill	Massachusetts	42.785434°N 71.071371°W	The placard on the monument states, "This Monument Erected by the City of Haverhill to Commemorate the Valor and Patriotism of the Men who Served in the War with Spain, Philippine Insurrection and China Relief Expedition 1898–1902. Dedicated October 24, 1926 under the Auspices of Sergeant Fred Thomas Camp No. 48 United Spanish War Veterans Department of Massachusetts."		
1926 (September 26)	Inside Bohemian National Cemetery	Chicago	Illinois	41.978222°N 87.722612°W	An additional plaque, in the ground at the base of the hiker, was dedicated May 17, 1964. The plaque, in the shape of a cross, was an honor roll of 147 names of comrades from American Camp No.30 United Spanish War Veterans dedicated by the last six members of the camp.		
1927	Lt Joseph F Wehner Park on Lynn Street	Everett	Massachusetts	42.420736°N 71.043583°W	The placard on the monument states "Erected by the City of Everett"		
1927 (September 5)	Garfield Square Market at 5th Street	Pottsville	Pennsylvania	40.684384°N 76.198636°W	The placard on the monument states the following, "Dedicated Sept. 5, 1927"		
1927 (October 12)	Oak Grove Cemetery, 230 Playstead Road	Medford	Massachusetts	42.431742°N 71.134631°W	The placard on the monument states "This Monument Erected by The City of Medford to her sons who on land and sea defended the Nation's honor in the war with Spain, the Insurrection in the Philippines and the China Relief Expedition 1898–1902. Dedicated Oct 12, 1927."		
1928	At the north end of Waltham Common	Waltham	Massachusetts	42°22′33.49″N 71°14′10.52″W			
1928	Located Foster Park, Bordered by State S.E., Cherry S.E., & Prospect S.E.	Grand Rapids	Michigan	42.959570°N 85.659920°W	Formerly located at Lookout Park, from 1928 to 1957. The placard on the monument states, "Freedom, Patriotism and Humanity. Dedicated to the soldiers and sailors of the war with Spain, Philippine Insurrection and China Relief Expedition."		
1928 (May 27)	In front of the Wichita Falls Memorial Auditorium.	Wichita Falls	Texas	33.909336°N 98.499641°W			
1929 (July 4)	Bronstein Park facing Hanover Street	Manchester	New Hampshire	42.991348°N 71.455902°W	The placard on the monument states "This Monument Erected by The City of Manchester to her sons who on land and sea defended the Nation's honor in the war with Spain, the Insurrection in the Philippines and the China Relief Expedition 1898–1902. Dedicated July 4, 1929."		
1929	Wisner Park	Elmira	New York	42.089039°N 76.808308°W	The placard on the monument states "In Memory of the Veterans who served during the Spanish American War, the Philippine Insurrection, the China Relief Expedition 1898 to 1902. Presented by the Citizens of Chemung County through the Honorable Board of Supervisors and the Honorable Mayor and Common Council of Elmira, N.Y. Erected 1929 Veterans Committee Mayor John D. Driscoll, P.D.C., William H. Shay P.C., Sumner O. Smith P.C., William D. Gelder P.C., Leon A. Forrest P.C." This Hiker was featured in a Post Card for Wisner Park in Elmira, New York in 1937.		
1931 (June 7)	South End of Forsyth Park	Savannah	Georgia	32.064915°N 81.097451°W	Officially called "The Georgia Volunteer," it was erected in Savannah because that city contributed more Spanish–American War soldiers per capita than any other city in Georgia.		
1934 (November 11)	Chelsea City Hall (500 Broadway)	Chelsea	Massachusetts	42.393421°N 71.033334°W	The placard on the monument states" This Memorial Erected by the Walter I. Chadbourne Camp No. 24 U.S.W.V. in Honor of the Men of Chelsea who served in the 1898 – Spanish–American War – 1902 Dedicated November 11, 1934 Volunteers all by their service and their lives they gave the blessings of liberty and justice to the oppressed people of Cuba and the Philippines" Additionally, the placard lists the names of the citizens of Chelsea that were members of the 1st Mass. Heavy Artillery H Battery U.S. Volunteers, members of the U.S. Army, U.S. Navy, Marine Corp, and identifies that Corp. Daniel J. Dempsey was killed in action July 1, 1898 at the Battle of El Caney.		
1934	Southeast corner of The Common	Woburn	Massachusetts	42°28′45.75″N 71°9′7.44″W			
1937	West side of Taunton Green	Taunton	Massachusetts	41°54′6.61″N 71°5′37.16″W	This Monument Commemorates the Volunteer Services of the men from the City of Taunton who on land and sea defended the Nation's Honor in the War with Spain, the Insurrection in the Philippines and the China Relief Expedition 1898–1902. Erected by Henry A. Williams Camp No. 29, United Spanish War Veterans, Dedicated October 10, 1937.		
1937 (October 10)	Greenspace located at College Heights Boulevard, North 28th and West Tilghman Street	Allentown	Pennsylvania	40°35′58″N 75°31′10″W	Leonard Sefing, Jr., a Spanish–American War veteran from Allentown, was the model for the statue. The placard on the monument states, "Erected by the County of Lehigh, the City of Allentown and George H. Schwartz Camp, No. 2, United Spanish War Veterans – to commemorate the valor and patriotism of those who served in the war with Spain, the Philippine Insurrection, and the China Relief Expedition.		
1938	Traffic island at the intersection of Plymouth Avenue and Pleasant Street	Fall River	Massachusetts	41.698609°N 71.146773°W	The base upon which statue stands is formed from the top of a column from the demolished Fall River Customs House and Post Office set on a slab of Fall River granite. In 1983, the local and state historical commissions nominated the statue for the National Register of Historic Places, but the listing was rejected.		
1938 (August 13th)	Intersection of Lincoln and Market Streets	Shamokin	Pennsylvania	40.789211°N 76.558415°W	The placard states "This monument was erected by the patriotic people of Shamokin and vicinity and the members of Major General Guy V. Henry Camp No. 11, United Spanish War Veterans, to commemorate the valor and patriotism of the men who served in the war with Spain, the Philippine Insurrection and the China Relief Expedition. Dedicated August 13, 1938"		
1938 (November 20)	Located in Oscar C Wallace Park, on the corner of Pleasant & Highland Streets	Malden	Massachusetts	42.426782°N 71.080842°W	The placard on the monument states "This Monument Erected by The City of Malden to her sons who on land and sea defended the Nation's honor in the war with Spain, Philippine Insurrection and the China Relief Expedition 1898–1902. Dedicated November 20, 1938 under the auspices of Col. Moses B. Lakeman Camp No. 44 United Spanish War Veterans."		
1939 (May 30)	Loyola Avenue, facing north into the intersection with Poydras Street	New Orleans	Louisiana	29°57′1.82″N 90°4′32.92″W	Originally located at North Claiborne and Canal Street		
1939 (October 22)	Hiker Park, at the intersection of Algoma Boulevard and Congress Avenue	Oshkosh	Wisconsin	44.034507°N 88.558546°W	Made possible through the public spirit and generosity of the late Colonel John Hicks of Oshkosh under the auspices of Nelson A. Miles Camp No. 1 United Spanish War Veterans		
1940 (June 30)	300 W. Main Street, Northside of courthouse lawn	Knoxville	Tennessee	35.961571°N 83.916448°W	The base of the monument is a boulder from taken from the Great Smoky Mountains National Park. Dedicated under the auspices of the Jack Bernard Camp, United Spanish War Veterans of Knoxville.	The Hiker-Knoxville, TN	
1940 (October 18)	Alabama Department of Archives and History-Statuary Hall,624 Washington Avenue	Montgomery	Alabama	32.375775°N 86.300380°W	This monument is located inside Statuary Hall and may be the only Hiker monument to be on display inside a climate controlled building.	Hiker in Statuary Hall, Montgomery, Alabama	
1940 (September 7)	Fisher Veterans' Memorial Park, near the intersection of South 10th and South 9th Streets	Lebanon	Pennsylvania	40.331827°N 76.425995°W	The placard on the monument states, "Dedicated to the men of Lebanon County who gave their lives in the Spanish American War." There are eight names listed on the placard.		
1941 (April 20)	Arcadia County Park	Arcadia	California	34.137689°N 118.033695°W	Dedicated to those who served in the war with Spain, the Philippine Insurrection and China Relief Expedition 1898–1902. Presented by the county of Los Angeles, the United Spanish–American War Veterans of Southern California and Friends.		
1941 (October 22)	State House Grounds next to Gervais Street	Columbia	South Carolina	34.001306°N 81.032917°W	Erected by the State of South Carolina and her citizens to honor the memory of her sons who served in the War with Spain, The Philippine Insurrection and the China Relief Expedition 1898–1902. Dedicated October 22, 1941 by the Department of South Carolina United Spanish War Veterans. Another plaque lists the regiments from South Carolina and the names of the men who volunteered for the yellow fever test in Cuba.		
1941 (November 23)	437 Broad Street	Meriden	Connecticut	41.531982°N 72.793852°W	Erected by the Meriden City Council in 1941 for $3,000 and includes a plaque listing 206 names of Spanish–American War veterans.		
1942 (May 23)	Located near North Landing Park, at the intersection of North Street and Crawford Parkway.	Portsmouth	Virginia	36.838627°N 76.298017°W	Erected by the citizens of Portsmouth and Norfolk County. Sponsored by the Austin R. Davis Camp No 4 – United Spanish War Veterans and Auxiliary to commemorate the valor and patriotism of those who voluntarily served in the war with Spain, the Philippine Insurrection and the China Relief Expedition.		
1943 (June 11)	North Lakewood and East Fayette street	Baltimore	Maryland	39.294602°N 76.579387°W	The pedestal is engraved with "Dedicated to the United Spanish War Veterans 1898–1902" The base is engraved "Erected 1943, Present by the State of Maryland, William M. Miller, Dept. Comdr"		
1944 (June 4)	At the North 20th Street entrance of Linn Park.	Birmingham	Alabama	33.520078°N 86.809350°W	Dedicated June 4, 1944, by the Ladies Auxiliary, United Spanish War Veterans, to the most unselfish mass act in history		
1946 (September 15)	Michigan State Capitol grounds on S. Capital Avenue	Lansing	Michigan	42.734370°N 84.554129°W	Erected through the efforts of the various camps and auxiliaries of the United Spanish War Veterans of Michigan and presented to the State of Michigan.		
1947	Penn Valley Park	Kansas City	Missouri	39°4′35.71″N 94°35′15.64″W			
1947	Arsenal Square	Cambridge	Massachusetts	42.378739°N 71.124197°W	The placard on the monument states, "This Monument Erected by the city of Cambridge to her sons who on land and sea defended the nation's honor in the war with Spain, the insurrection in the Philippines, and the China Relief Expedition 1898–1902. Dedicated October 12, 1947 under the auspices of Leslie F. Hunting Camp No. 12 United Spanish War Veterans"		
1948 (October 5)	Elm Street & Morris Avenue	Morristown	New Jersey	40°47′46.7″N 74°28′25.94″W	On the back are carved the names of the Morristown men who died in service.		
1949	Capitol Park	Sacramento	California	38°34′34.18″N 121°29′33.86″W			
1949 (August 12)	Howard Park located at the corner of Parker and Okeechobee Blvd	West Palm Beach	Florida	26.705526°N 80.061346°W	The placard on the monument states, "This monument is presented by Public Subscription to United Spanish War Veterans Department of Florida to Commemorate the Valor and patriotism of the Men Who served in the War with Spain, Philippines Insurrection and China Relief Expedition, 1898–1902. Dedicated August 12, 1949 under the auspices of the W.E. Compton Camp, West Palm Beach, Florida."		
1951	Texas State Capitol grounds, near the western corner of the Capitol building	Austin	Texas	30°16′28.72″N 97°44′29.7″W	The Hiker is the last war memorial to be added on the grounds of the Texas State Capitol.		
1956	Spanish–American War Memorial Park, East Parkway Street and Central Avenue	Memphis	Tennessee	35.125683°N 89.985220°W	Inscription on plaque affixed to base reads: "The Hiker Typifying the American Volunteer who fought Spain in Cuba, the Philippines, and Boxer Rebellion. Erected in 1956 with funds raised by Spanish War Veterans of Memphis under the leadership of Fred Bauer, Commander."		
1959 (February 15)	Armory Park	Tucson	Arizona	32.218892°N 110.968343°W	Installed January 22, 1959		
1965 (July 24)	Memorial Drive, just outside Arlington National Cemetery	Arlington	Virginia	38°53′4.57″N 77°3′44.73″W	The United Spanish War Veterans Memorial, consisting of a casting of the statue atop a granite plinth, is one of several monuments "not formally part of Arlington Cemetery."		
