= Monument to the Heroes of Cavite and Santiago de Cuba =

Heroes of Cavite and Santiago de Cuba
- Héroes de Cavite y Santiago de Cuba
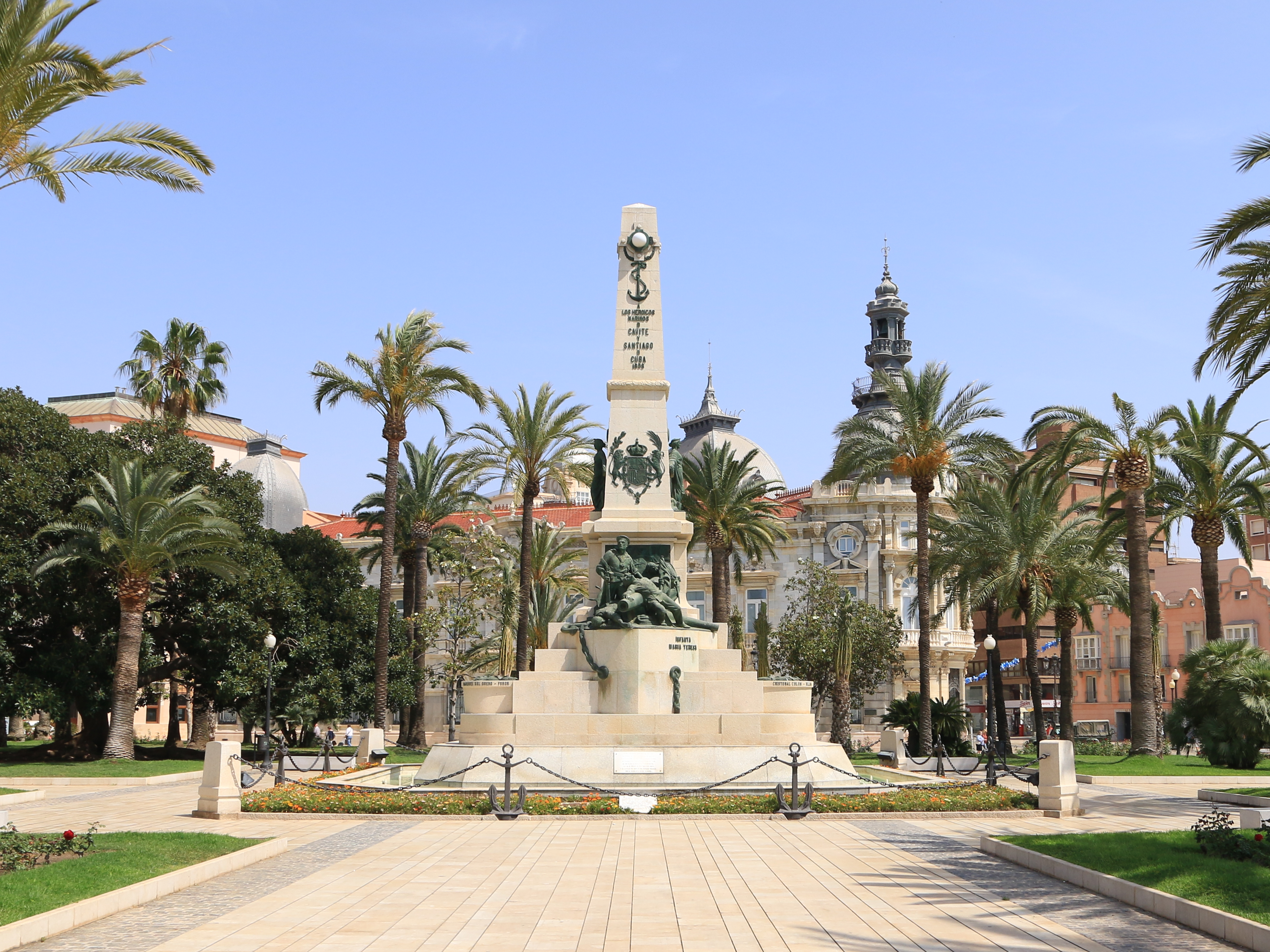
- Location: Plaza Héroes de Cavite, Cartagena, Spain
- Coordinates: 37.598193°N 0.985786°W
- Designer: Julio González-Pola
- Material: Stone, bronze
- Height: 15 m
- Opening date: 9 November 1923
- Dedicated to: The heroic role of the Montojo and Cervera naval squadrons during the 1898 Spanish–American War

The Monument to the Heroes of Cavite and Santiago de Cuba (Spanish: Monumento a los Héroes de Cavite y Santiago de Cuba) is an instance of public art and war memorial in Cartagena, Spain. It commemorates the role of the naval squadrons commanded by Patricio Montojo and Pascual Cervera during the 1898 Spanish–American War.

== History and description ==
Following the end of World War I, the project for the erection of a monument to those Spanish soldiers participant in the previous Spanish–American War was promoted by infantry captain Francisco Anaya Ruiz in 1919. It was funded via popular subscription, including from a number of high-profile subscriptors such as King Alfonso XIII himself, the Captain-General Miguel Primo de Rivera or the Cardinal Primate of Spain Victoriano Guisasola. Once collected enough funds, the project was awarded to Julio González-Pola, and then the managing committee for the monument opted for Cartagena over Cádiz as location. Monument building works ended by August 1923.

The monument was unveiled on 9 November 1923 during a ceremony attended by the likes of the Monarch, Primo de Rivera (then already dictator after the September 1923 coup) or the US Ambassador Alexander Pollock Moore, among others. It specifically came to commemorate "the heroic behavior of the Montojo and Cervera squadrons in the naval battles of Cavite and Santiago de Cuba, which were decisive in the Spanish defeat against the United States and the loss of Cuba, the Philippines and Puerto Rico".

Standing a maximum height of 15 metres, the architectural part of the monument—made of stone—is formed by a pedestal from whose centre an obelisk emerges. A number of bronze sculptural elements are incorporated to the stone pieces, including two allegories of Glory, the coat of arms of Spain, two sculptural groups conveying respectively the ideas of 'Heroism' and 'Patria' ("homeland") and several ornamental items depicting artifacts or devices related to seafaring. The front and back sides of the obelisk respectively read "a los heroicos marinos de cavite y santiago de cuba, 1898" ("To the Heroic Sailors of Cavite and Santiago de Cuba, 1898") and "honor a las escuadras de cervera y montojo" ("Honor to the Cervera and Montojo squadrons") while the lateral inscriptions consist of a compilation of casualties in both battles.

After a positive report from the regional Service of Historical Heritage in November 2019, the procedure for the declaration of the monument as Bien de Interés Cultural was initiated in 2020.

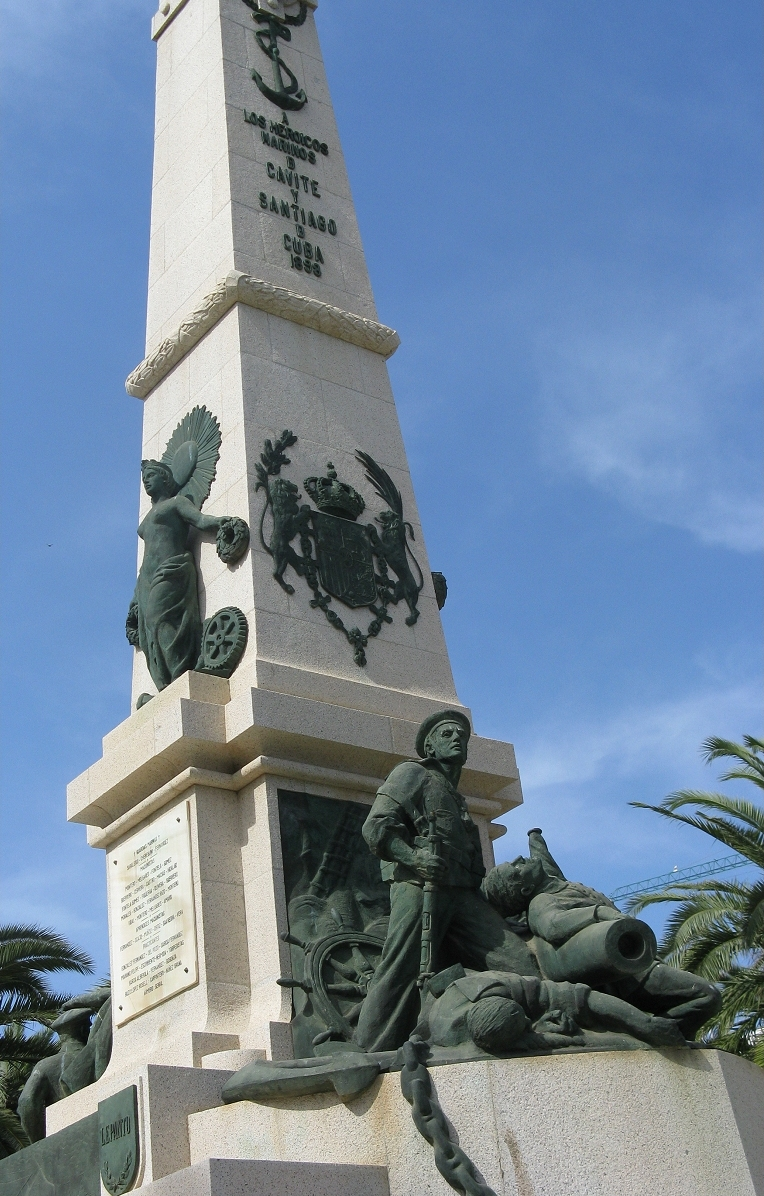
Front side featuring the sculptural ensemble dedicated to Heroism

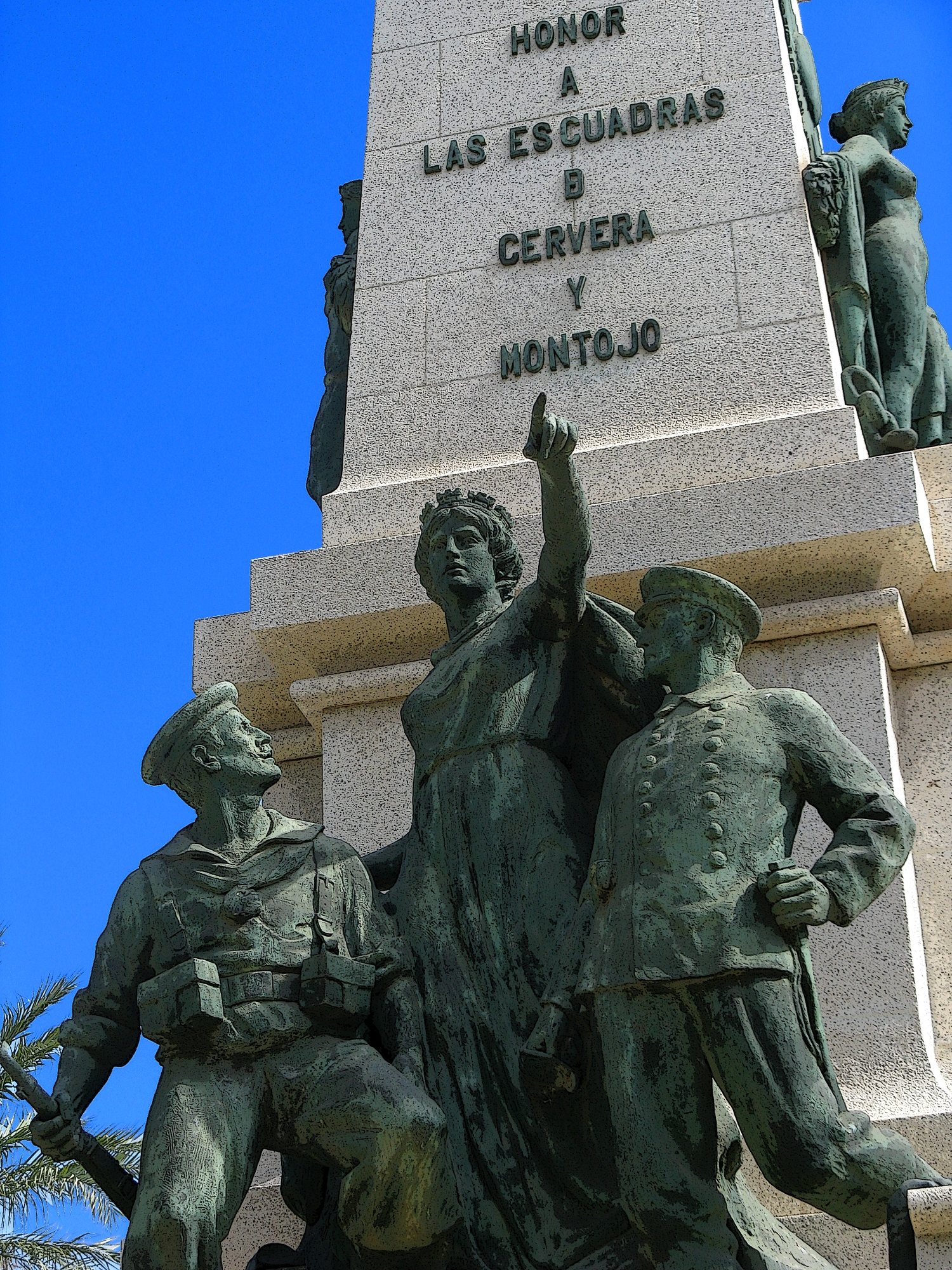
Back side including the sculptural group dedicated to Patria

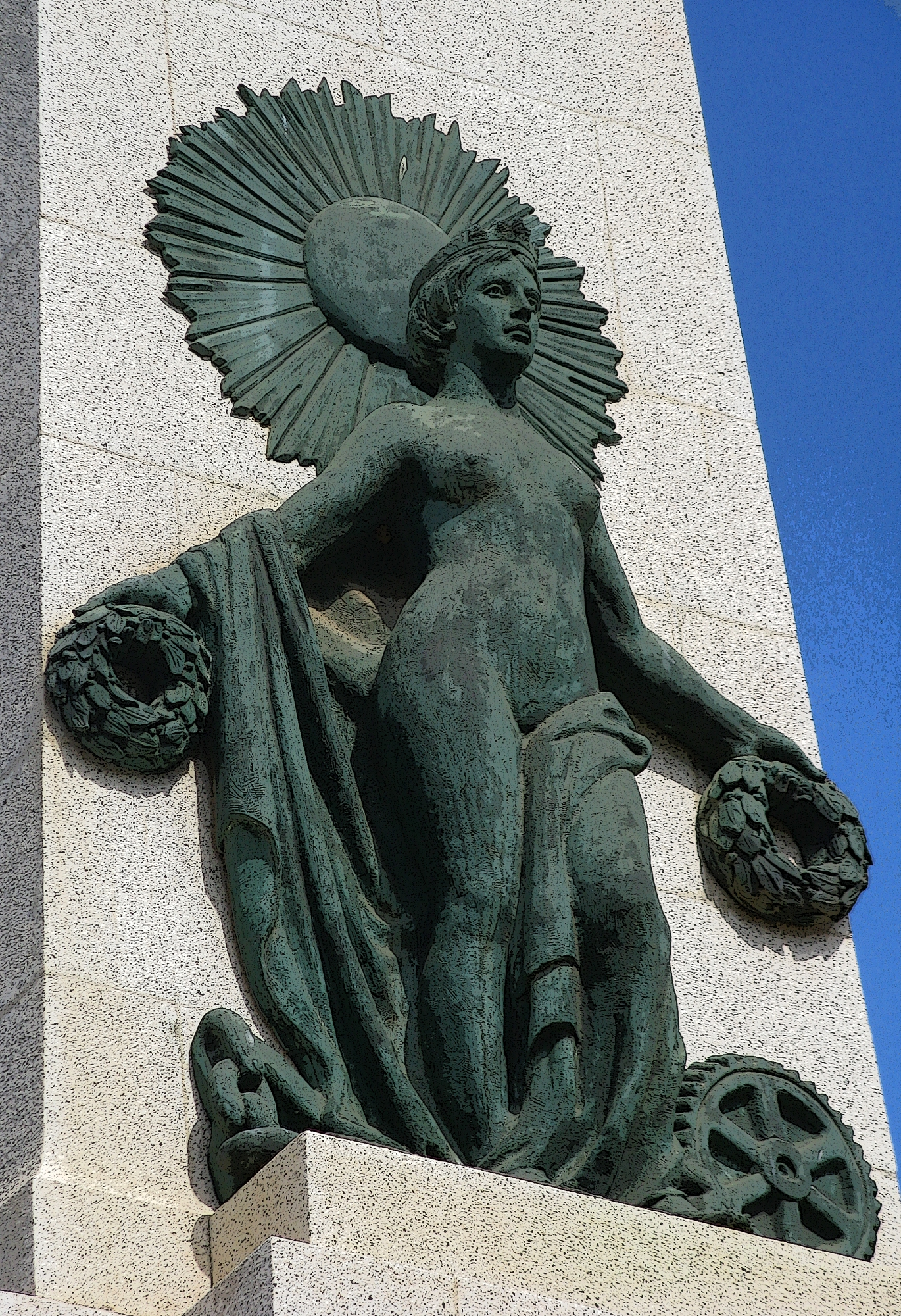
One of the two Glories
