= Spanish–American War Soldier =

Monument in Milwaukee, Wisconsin, US

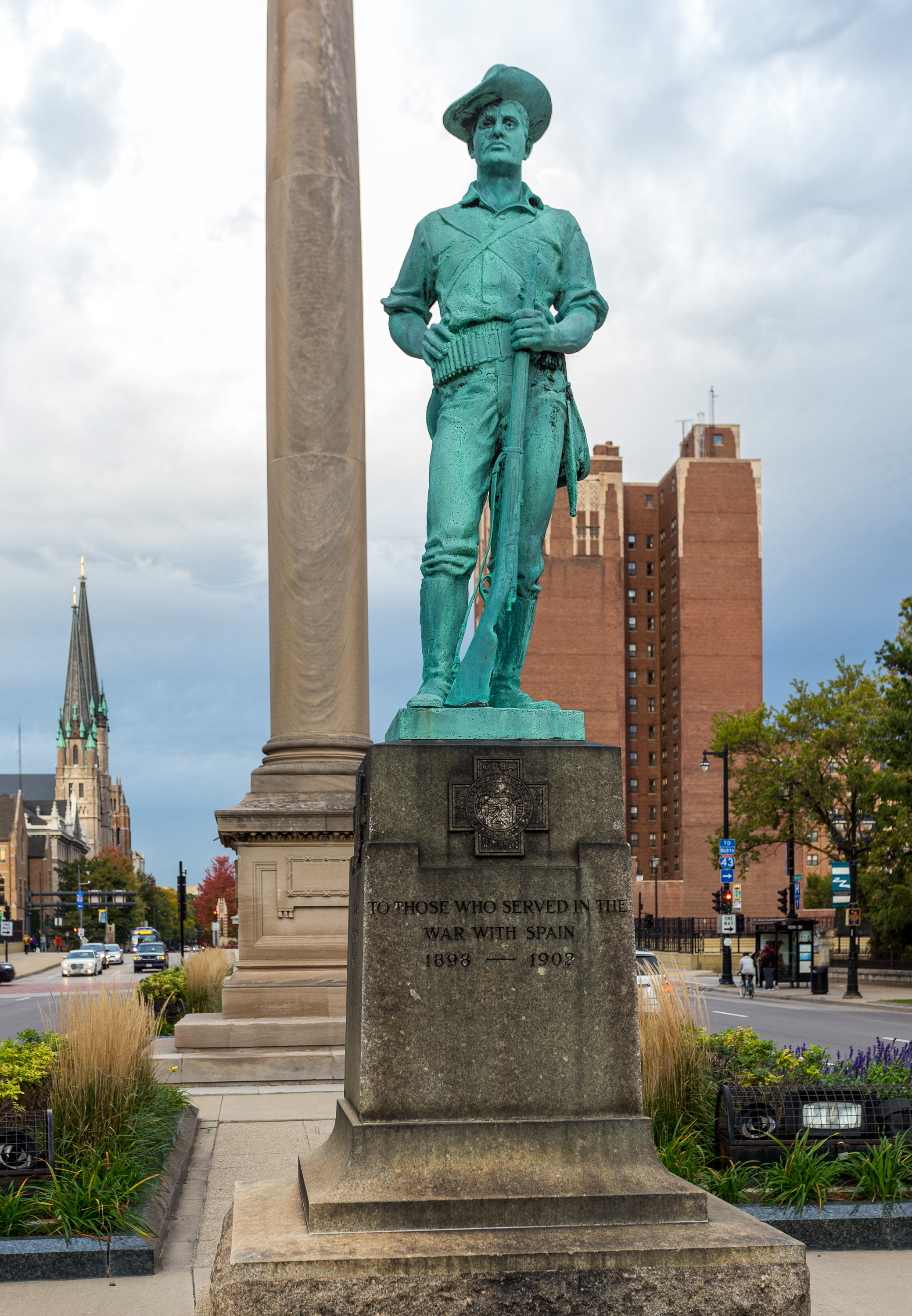
- Artist: American Bronze Company
- Year: 1932
- Type: bronze
- Dimensions: 220 cm (88 in)
- Location: W. Wisconsin Ave. between N. 8th and N. 10th St., Milwaukee, Wisconsin; 43°2′19.466″N 87°55′24.299″W
- Owner: City of Milwaukee

Spanish–American War Soldier is a public art work created by the American Bronze Company and located in downtown Milwaukee, Wisconsin. The bronze figure depicts a uniformed soldier with an ammunition belt around his waist and a rifle in hand.

== Background ==
The inscription on its plinth reads, "To those who served in the war with Spain, 1898 - 1902." It is located in the middle of West Wisconsin Avenue between North 9th and 10th Streets in the Court of Honor near the Milwaukee Public Library.

== See also ==
- Spanish–American War
