= Spanish–American War Memorial (Arlington National Cemetery) =

War memorial in Virginia, US

- United States
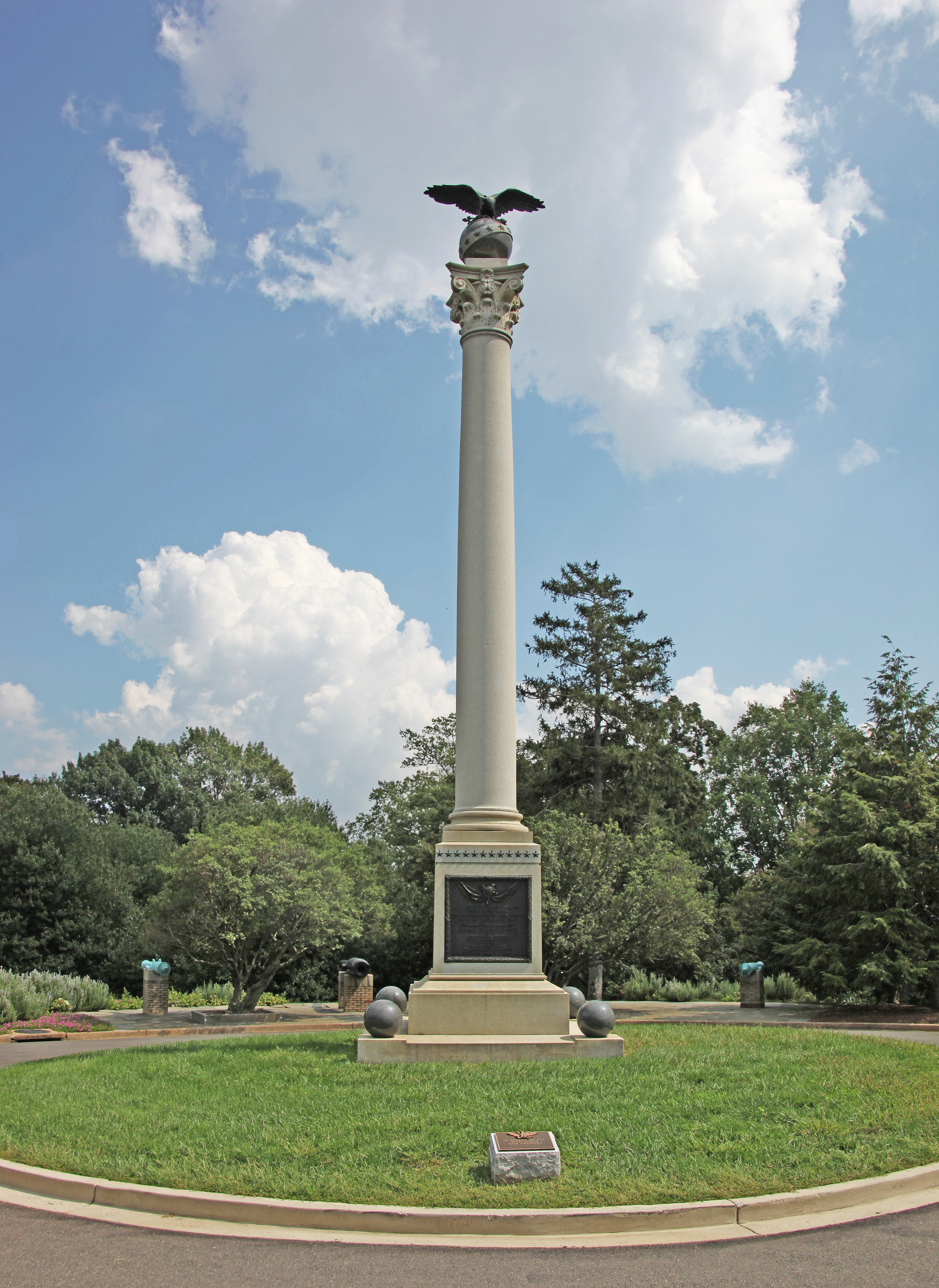
- The Spanish–American War Memorial in 2011
- For those American military personnel who died in the Spanish–American War
- Unveiled: May 12, 1902; 124 years ago
- Location: 38.875374°N 77.074544°W near Arlington County, Virginia, U.S.

The Spanish–American War Memorial is a memorial in Arlington National Cemetery in Arlington County, Virginia, in the United States that commemorates those American military personnel who died in the Spanish–American War. Constructed by the National Society of the Colonial Dames of America and dedicated on May 21, 1902, the memorial consists of a granite column in the center of a small grass-covered plaza. A granite sphere and bronze eagle with outstretched wings stand atop the shaft. The memorial faces west; to its rear across Lawton Avenue is a flagstone terrace on which are placed four cannon, aimed east.

== Spanish–American War dead at Arlington National Cemetery ==
The Spanish–American War was a ten-week conflict that occurred in the spring and summer of 1898. Cuba had been waging a war of independence against Spain since 1895, an effort largely supported by the United States (which had extensive economic interests on the island). To ensure the safety of American citizens and property in Cuba, the United States sent the battleship USS Maine (ACR-1) to Havana in late January 1898. The Maine exploded under mysterious circumstances and was destroyed with large loss of life on February 15. American newspapers whipped up war fever, and held Spain responsible for the ship's destruction. The United States Congress enacted a joint resolution demanding independence for Cuba, and President William McKinley signed it into law on April 20. In response, Spain severed diplomatic relations on April 21. The same day, the United States Navy began a blockade of Cuba. Spain declared war on April 23. On April 25, Congress declared that a state of war between the U.S. and Spain had existed since April 21.

The Spanish–American War began on April 25, 1898, and ended on August 12, 1898. Cuban and Spanish dead vastly outnumbered American deaths. While 2,910 American military personnel died during the war, just 345 were combat deaths. The rest died of disease. More than 1,800 Americans were buried in Cuba, Hawaii, the Philippines, and Puerto Rico. On July 8, 1898, Congress enacted legislation authorizing the repatriation of American dead, and appropriating funds for this purpose. Additional legislation was enacted on February 9, 1900; May 26, 1900; and June 6, 1900. Many of the dead were buried at Arlington National Cemetery, either because their families desired it or the remains could not be identified. Of the dead, 226 were disinterred in Cuba, 20 from Puerto Rico, and 24 from Hawaii. This represented the first time in history that Americans who died in battle overseas were repatriated to the United States for burial. Most of the military dead were buried in what is now Section 22, while members of the Rough Riders (or 1st United States Volunteer Cavalry) were buried in Section 23. Civilian nurses (all of whom died of disease) were buried in what is now Section 21.

== First Spanish–American War Memorial ==
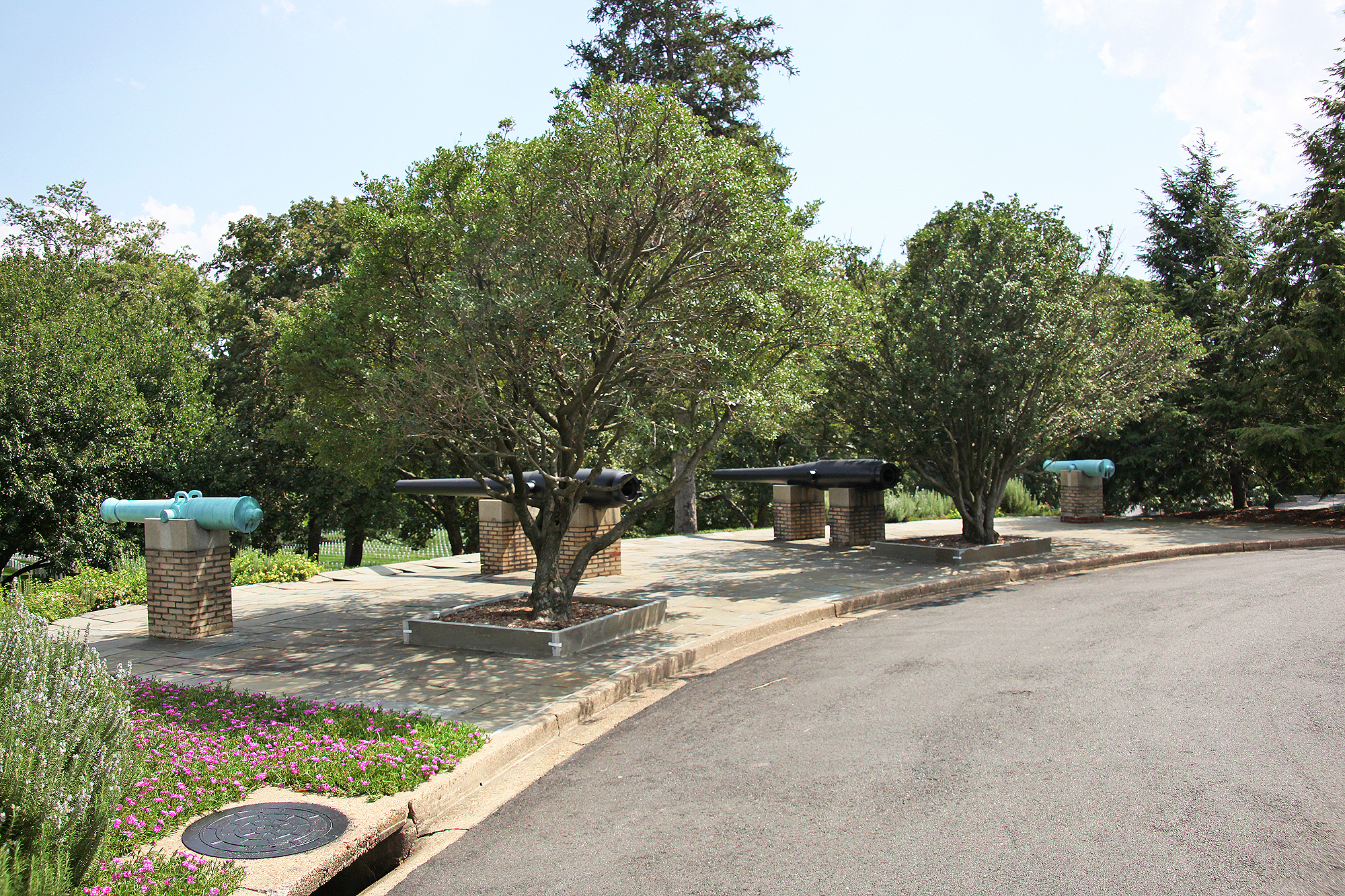
The four cannon at the Spanish–American War Memorial.

Some time in early 1900, four guns captured during the war were erected in the Spanish–American War dead burial field. The two modern guns were taken from the Spanish Navy armored cruisers Vizcaya and Infanta Maria Teresa. The provenance of the two smaller bronze cannon is less clear. One newspaper of the day said they came from a Spanish coastal battery in Cuba (which the paper did not identify), but the Washington Post was more specific and said they came from a coastal battery near Castillo de San Pedro de la Roca (also known as "Morro Castle") at Sevilla near Santiago de Cuba. All four guns were mounted on granite pedestals. The bronze cannon were spiked, while the modern guns had their breechblocks removed.

No trees were immediately planted around the site, leaving it barren but also visible from the Potomac River.

== The Second Spanish–American War Memorial ==
=== The Capron effort ===
In February or March 1899, as Sections 21, 22, and 23 were being prepared for the burial of Spanish–American War dead, Secretary of War Elihu Root chose a promontory on the eastern edge of the burial field as the site for a new Spanish–American War memorial. Veterans of the war strongly supported the construction of a memorial, but no action was taken. Agnes Kissam Capron, wife of Captain Allyn K. Capron, Sr. (an Army artillery officer who died of typhoid fever in September 1898), began lobbying Congress in April 1900 to appropriate money for a memorial and Representative John H. Ketcham introduced H.R. 11091 to authorize it.

But Mrs. Capron left for the Philippines to engage in Red Cross work shortly after her lobbying effort began, and no action was taken by Congress.

=== National Society of Colonial Dames effort ===
At its April 1900 National Council meeting in Washington, D.C., the National Society of the Colonial Dames of America voted to seek to place a memorial to Spanish–American War dead at Arlington National Cemetery. The genesis of this effort is unclear, but a committee to consider "the subject of a tablet at Arlington in memory of the officers, soldiers, and sailors of the Spanish–American War" was appointed some time prior to the biennial National Council meeting. Winifred Lee Brent Lyster, wife of Dr. Henry Francis LeHunte Lyster of Michigan and a relative of Confederate Army General Robert E. Lee, conceived of and was the primary advocate for the memorial. The Memorial Committee proposed a bronze tablet bearing the name of all those who died (from whatever cause) during the war, and that this tablet be erected before the National Council meeting in May 1902. The National Council approved a motion to have a tablet erected, but left the design and content up to a committee (to be appointed by the chair), which was given the power to act on the resolution.

=== Fundraising, design, and site selection ===
Lyster was appointed chair of the society's Spanish War Memorial Committee. She wrote more than 2,000 letters asking for funds for the memorial. Almost $7,300 ($271,644 in 2025 dollars) was raised.

Choosing a site for the memorial was not difficult. The Army Quartermaster Corps controlled Arlington National Cemetery, and in March 1901 Lyster asked the Quartermaster General, Brigadier General Marshall I. Ludington, for permission to erect the memorial at Arlington National Cemetery. Permission was granted, provided the federal government bore none of the cost. It is unclear just when the society obtained the pre-determined 1899 site, however. The Secretary of War had chosen the site in early 1899, and the existing memorial was already located there. Obtaining the site for the Society memorial was not a foregone conclusion. The record is clear, however, that Justine Van Rensselaer Townsend, President of the National Society of Colonial Dames, approached Secretary of the War Root directly and secured the existing location for the Society's memorial.

A Committee on Estimates and Designs, a subcommittee of the Spanish War Memorial Committee, was established to oversee the design of the memorial. The process by which designs were solicited and chosen is not clear. However, the winning design was submitted by Society member Edith Bucklin Hartshorn Mason of Rhode Island. The National Society of Colonial Dames was required to obtain the consent of the Quartermaster Corps for the memorial's design. Major Theodore A. True, an officer in the U.S. Army Signal Corps at Fort Myer, served as the representative of the Quartermaster General at the cemetery. True expressed concern over the original design. The design was changed and resubmitted several times before it met with True's approval. True submitted the final draft design to Brigadier General Ludington. Ludington approved it and forwarded it to Secretary of War Elihu Root. Root confirmed True and Ludington's decision and on October 23, 1901, informed the Society that it could erect its memorial.

With the design approved, the Spanish War Memorial Committee's attention turned toward the language to be inscribed on the memorial. Lyster and another Spanish War Memorial Committee member, Hortense Addison Batré, visited the Pan-American Exposition in Buffalo, New York, in the summer of 1901, and were impressed by the inscriptions written on the pediment above the main doorway of each exhibit hall. They learned that these were written by the poet Richard Watson Gilder, editor of The Century Magazine. Townsend was acquainted with Gilder, and Lyster and Batré asked Townsend to convince Gilder to provide language for the bronze tablet. Townsend met with Gilder, and after some initial resistance he agreed to write the inscription.

=== Dedication ===
The monument was unveiled and dedicated on May 21, 1902. President Theodore Roosevelt permitted all civilian and military government employees to be excused at noon so that they could attend the dedication ceremony.

The day of the event, 150 representatives to the National Council of the National Society of Colonial Dames convened in Washington, D.C., to conduct the business of the society before adjourning in the afternoon to attend the dedication at Arlington National Cemetery.

The 4:30 P.M. dedication ceremony was overseen by Major General John R. Brooke, commander of the U.S. Army's Department of the East. Nearly 1,000 members of the Spanish War Veterans—led by Lee M. Lipscomb, their national commander—mustered at 6th and E Streets NW and marched to the cemetery. Attending the ceremony were a battalion from the Corps of Engineers and a battalion of Light Artillery (each of which included a band). A battalion of United States Marines from the Washington Navy Yard and four troop of cavalry from Fort Myer also participated. Commanding the battalions were Captain James T. Dean, 10th Infantry, and Captains Leroy S. Lyon and Edwin Landon, Light Artillery Corps. Dignitaries in attendance included President Theodore Roosevelt, Secretary of War Elihu Root, Cabinet secretary George B. Cortelyou, Lieutenant General John Schofield (retired Commanding General of the U.S. Army), and Lieutenant General Nelson A. Miles (incumbent Commanding General of the U.S. Army). The bands played the "Dead March" (a dirge) from the oratorio Saul, and a 40-person choir from St. John's Episcopal Church sang "Onward, Christian Soldiers". Father T. S. Dolan of St. Patrick's Catholic Church provided the invocation. Episcopal Bishop Henry Y. Satterlee read the Episcopal funeral service for the dead, and then the audience sang "My Country, 'Tis of Thee". Mrs. Townsend of the National Society of Colonial Dames spoke briefly, and then the shroud was pulled from the monument. After a brief viewing by dignitaries, President Roosevelt addressed the crowd. "The Star-Spangled Banner" was sung, and then Bishop Saterlee gave the benediction. The bands played "Nearer, My God, to Thee" as the audience dispersed.

== About the memorial ==
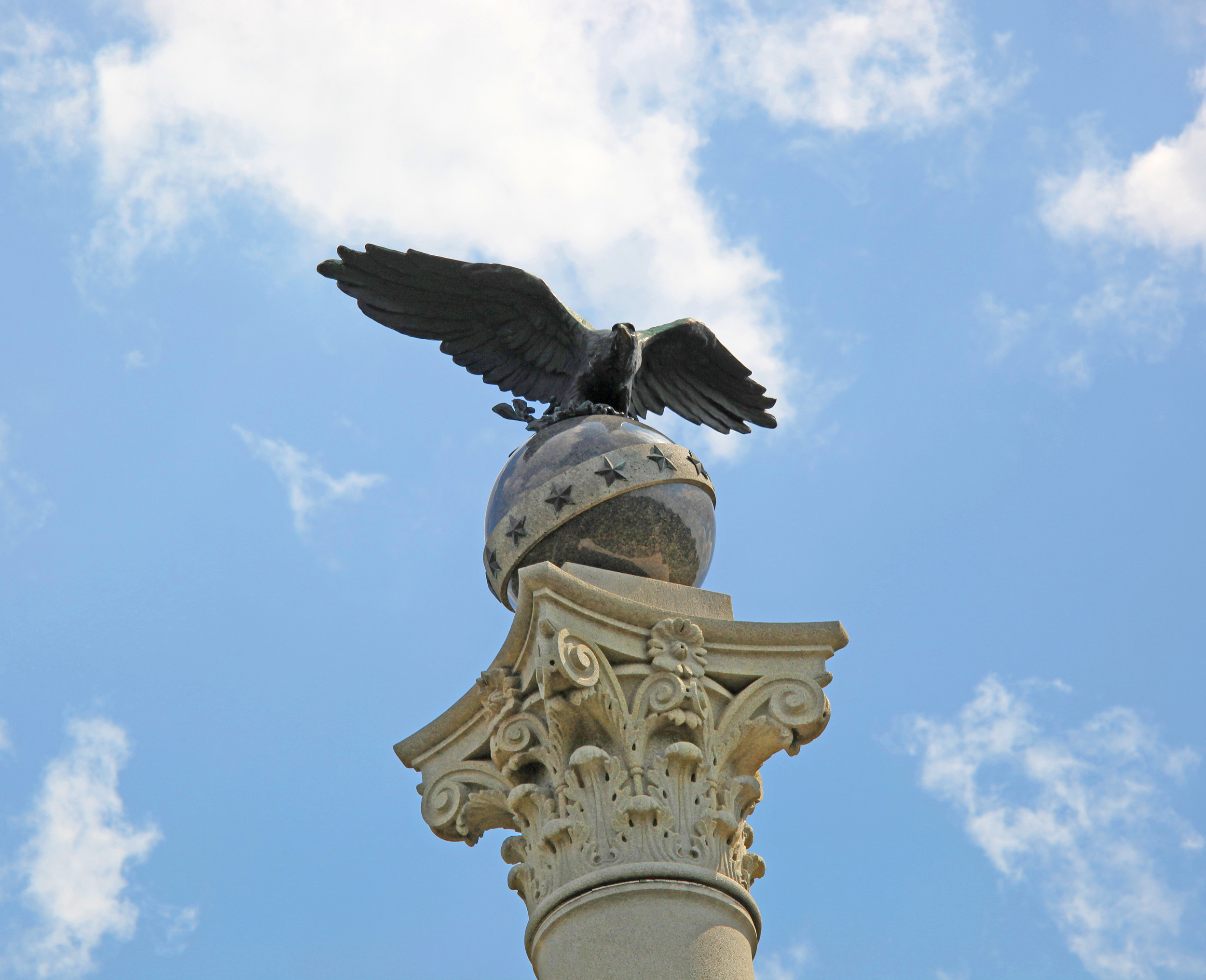
The eagle and sphere atop the capital at the Spanish–American War Memorial.

The Spanish–American War Memorial consists of a column of gray granite 54 feet (16 m) high quarried in Barre, Vermont. Atop the column is a bronze eagle with outstretched wings, facing west. The eagle is mounted on a granite globe, which was quarried in Quincy, Massachusetts. A band decorated with 13 stars (representing the original Thirteen Colonies) is carved in high relief on the globe. The globe stands on a square base. The base stands atop a Corinthian capital which crowns the column.

The column rests upon a tall plinth with a square cross-section. Around the top of the plinth are bronze stars 5 inches (13 cm) across. There are 11 stars on each of the four sides, for a total of 44 stars. A bronze tablet affixed to the front (west face) of the memorial contains the following language:

To the soldiers and sailors of the United States who gave up their lives for their country in the war of 1898–99 with Spain this monument is dedicated in sorrow, gratitude, and pride by the National Society of Colonial Dames of America in the name of all the women of the nation. 1902.

The plinth stands on a larger square base, which sits atop a foundation set in the earth. On each corner of the foundation is a polished black granite sphere 18 inches (46 cm) in diameter.

The total cost of the monument was $9,000 ($322,500 in 2025 dollars).

At the rear of the monument across Lawton Drive is a flagstone terrace. Four cannon, mounted on low brick pillars capped with concrete, stand on the eastern edge of this terrace. The guns point east. The inner two guns are larger and more modern, and were taken from the Spanish Navy armored cruisers Vizcaya and Infanta Maria Teresa. The two outer guns are smaller and made of bronze, and likely were captured from the Spanish coastal battery Castillo de San Pedro de la Roca at Sevilla near Santiago de Cuba.

The memorial is notable because it was the first national memorial erected by a national society of women. The Boston Evening Transcript criticized the memorial for being too plain for the magnificent site. It editorialized that the society should have taken time to collect more money, and built a more elaborate memorial. The newspaper expressed its hope that the Army would place no other memorials near it.

=== Second bronze tablet ===
The National Society of Colonial Dames was given permission to add a second bronze tablet to the rear of the memorial in 1964. The 3-foot-6-inch (1.07 m) square tablet was placed on the memorial on October 11, 1964. It reads:

To The Glory Of God And
In Grateful Remembrance
Of The Men And Women Of
The Armed Forces Who In
This Century Gave Their
Lives For Our Country
That Freedom Might Live
* * *
This Tablet Is Dedicated By The
National Society Of The Colonial Dames
Of America
October 11, 1964

=== Third bronze tablet ===
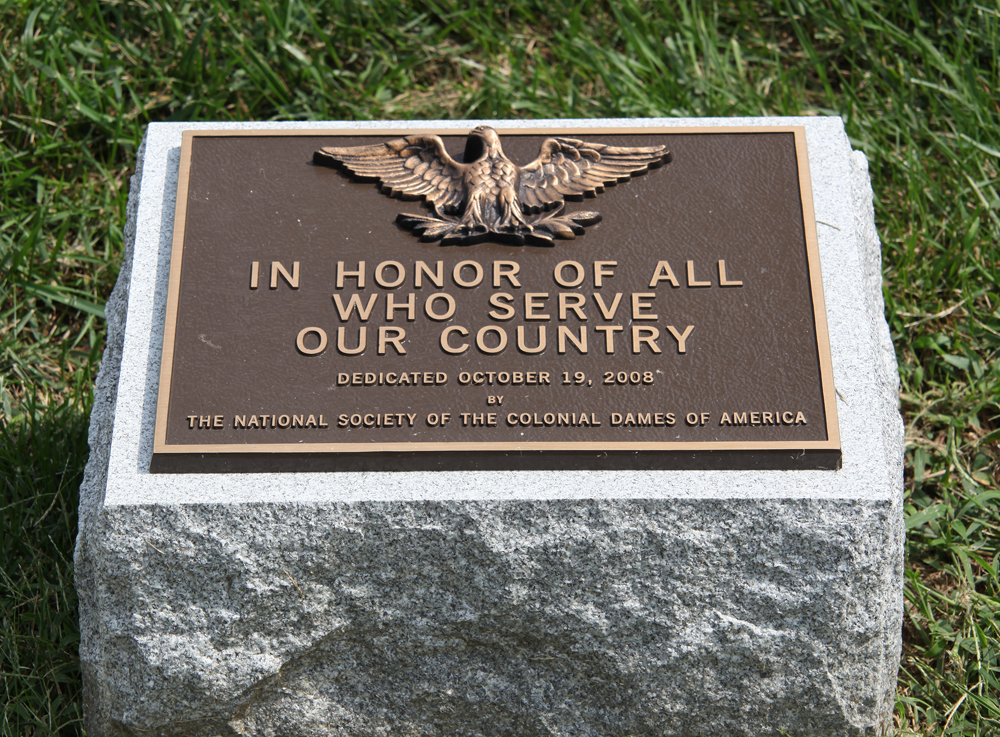
The third bronze tablet at the Spanish–American War memorial.

The National Society of Colonial Dames placed a third bronze tablet at the memorial on October 19, 2008. This 12-by-8-inch (30 by 20 cm) tablet has a small eagle, clutching arrows and olive branches, in high relief at the top. It is attached to a rough grey granite base 6 inches (15 cm) high, which is set into the earth on the far western side of the grassy plaza. It is inscribed with the words:

In Honor of All
Who Serve Our Country
Dedicated October 19, 2008
by
The National Society of Colonial Dames of America

== Memorial Record Book ==
When the Spanish War Memorial Committee's Committee on Estimates and Designs considered the nature of the memorial, it quickly realized that the number of dead was too numerous to list their names on a tablet. A memorial book listing the names of the dead was more appropriate, so the Spanish War Memorial Committee established a second subcommittee, the Record Book Committee, to produce this volume. Esther Gill Jackson of Maryland was appointed chair of this subcommittee. Rosa Wright Smith of Washington, D.C., the society's Assistant National Secretary, was assigned to aid her. Jackson sent hundreds of letters to state militia commanders, requesting complete lists of the name, rank, and home towns of those in state militia and volunteer regiments who died in the war. Complete lists of U.S. Army and U.S. Navy dead were obtained from General Henry Clarke Corbin, Adjutant General of the Army, and Rear Admiral Presley Marion Rixey, Surgeon General of the Navy.

The Record Book (also known as the "Book of Patriots") published by the society was lavish. Almost $760 ($27,233 in 2025 dollars) was raised to produce it. The 16-by-11-inch (41 by 28 cm) book had 6,480 lines of information on 324 pages. The chapter page for each state was ornamental, the information pages consisted of parchment, and each line was hand-drawn in India ink. The book was covered in dark green Levant Morocco leather, and hand-bound by the Ruzicka Bindery of Baltimore.

The Record Book Committee decided that a book stand should also be designed, constructed, and donated to Arlington National Cemetery to permit display of the Record Book. Members of the subcommittee were asked to submit designs for the book stand, nine of which were received. In January 1904, the Record Book Committee chose a design submitted by Lois B. Cassatt of Pennsylvania. A "Mr. Evans" of Philadelphia was the designer (i.e., Allen Evans, architect with the firm Furness & Evans. This firm designed Cheswold, the Cassatt summer home.) The winning design consisted of a table on a brick pillar, to be placed in the basement of Arlington House. The book was to be kept in a lockable, fire-proof box. The U.S. government provided an inscription for the inside lid of the box. The table was intended to be of soapstone or other durable, beautiful material.

The book stand was given to Arlington National Cemetery in 1904. Although designed to stand on the earth in the cellar of Arlington House, cemetery officials placed it on one of the wooden floors above. The book stand was so heavy that the floor sagged and required reinforcement. At the time, the building was not a house museum but rather contained the living quarters of the Superintendent of Arlington National Cemetery and office space for him and his staff. In 1929, the Record Book was transferred from Arlington House to Arlington Memorial Amphitheater when the main floor of the amphitheater became a Memorial Exhibit Hall displaying honors received by the unknown soldiers lying beneath the Tomb of the Unknowns. (It is not clear if it was put on display, or housed in the second-floor offices.) The cemetery offices moved into what is now the Old Administration Building in 1932, and the book stand was misplaced. Its whereabouts are not known as of 2013.

== Bibliography ==
- Annual Reports of the War Department for the Fiscal Year Ended June 30, 1900. Reports of the Chiefs of Bureaus. Volume 2, Parts 1-8. Washington, D.C.: Government Printing Office, 1900.
- Bigler, Philip. In Honored Glory: Arlington National Cemetery, the Final Post. Arlington, Va.: Vandamere Press, 1999.
- Dyal, Donald H; Carpenter, Brian B.; and Thomas, Mark A. Historical Dictionary of the Spanish American War. Westport, Conn.: Greenwood Press, 1996.
- Federal Writers' Project. Washington, City and Capital. Washington, D.C.: U.S. Government Printing Office, 1937.
- Gurney, Gene. Arlington National Cemetery: A Picture Story of America's Most Famous Burial Grounds from the Civil War to President John F. Kennedy's Burial. New York: Crown Publishers, 1965.
- Hinkel, John Vincent. Arlington: Monument to Heroes. New York: Prentice-Hall, 1965.
- "History of Bills and Joint Resolutions." In Congressional Record: Containing the Proceedings and Debates of the Fifty-Fifth Congress, Third Session. Volume XXXII. Washington, D.C.: Government Printing Office, 1899.
- Moore, Charles. History of Michigan. Chicago: Lewis Pub. Co., 1915.
- National Society of the Colonial Dames of America. Minutes of the Council of the National Society of The Colonial Dames of America Held in Washington, D.C., The Arlington, April 25, 26, 27, 28, 1900. Manchester, N.H.: The Mirror Press, 1900.
- National Society of the Colonial Dames of America. Minutes of the Council of the National Society of The Colonial Dames of America Held in Washington, D.C., May 21, 1902. Manchester, N.H.: The Mirror Press, 1902.
- National Society of the Colonial Dames of America. Minutes of the Seventh Biennial Council of the National Society of The Colonial Dames of America Held in Washington, D.C., May 4, 1904. Atlanta: Foote & Davies Co., 1904.
- National Society of the Colonial Dames of America. Minutes of the Eighth Biennial Council of the National Society of The Colonial Dames of America Held in Washington, D.C., May 4, 1904. August, Ga.: Shaver Printing Company, 1906.
- National Society of the Colonial Dames of America. The National Society of the Colonial Dames of America, Its Beginnings, Its Purpose and a Record of Its Work, 1891–1913. Washington, D.C.: National Society of the Colonial Dames of America, 1913.
- Quartermaster Corps. Annual Report of the Quartermaster General of the Operations of the Quartermaster's Department for the Fiscal Year Ending on the 30th of June 1900. Washington, D.C.: Government Printing Office, 1900.
- Trask, David F. The War With Spain in 1898. Lincoln, Neb.: University of Nebraska Press, 1996.
