= Spanish–American War Veterans Memorial =

Sculpture and war memorial in Portland, Oregon

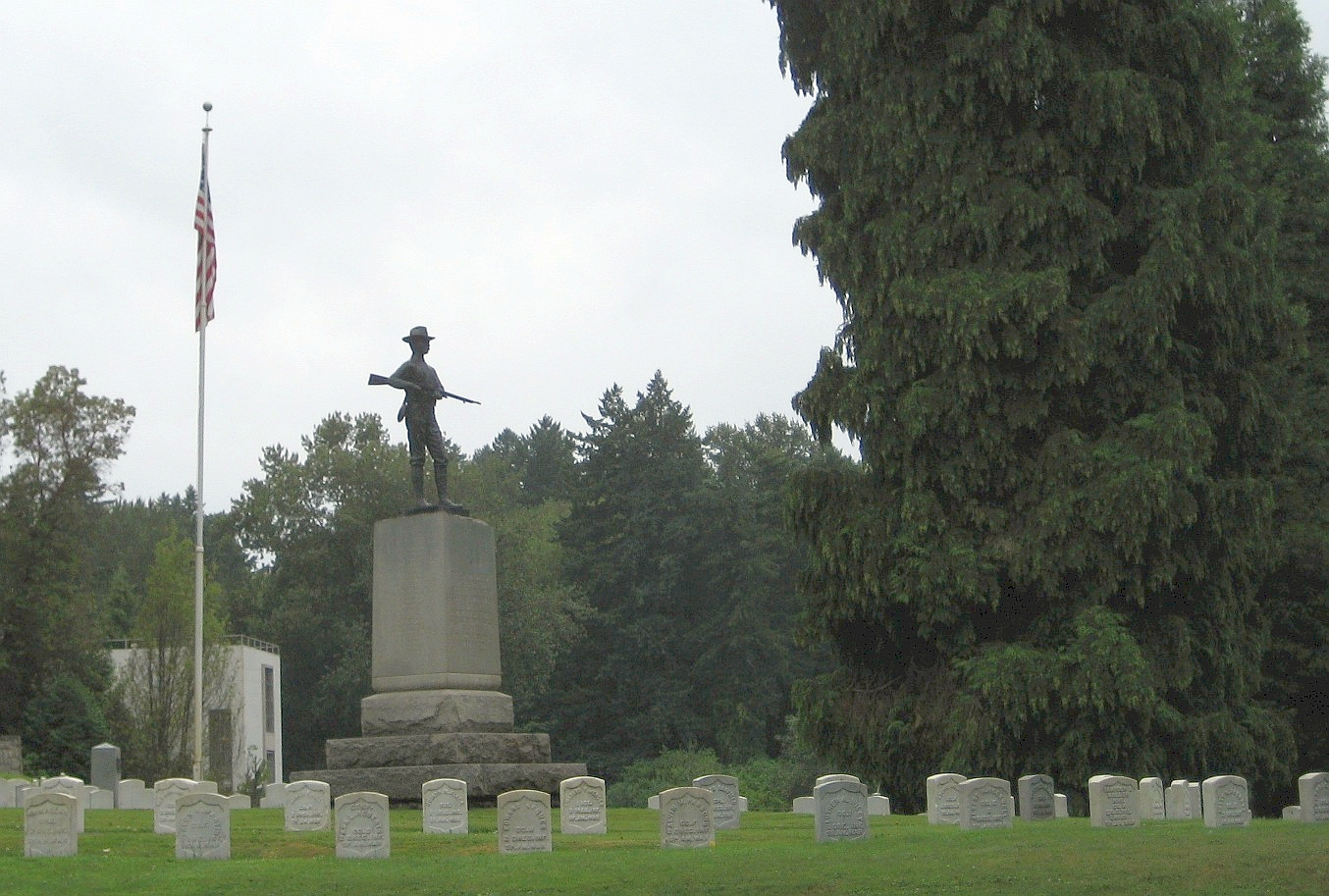
- The memorial in 2007
- Medium: Sculpture
- Weight: >600 pounds
- Location: Portland, Oregon, United States
- 45.466188°N 122.672089°W

The Spanish–American War Veterans Memorial, also known as the Soldier's Monument and Graves, is an outdoor memorial commemorating those who fought in the Spanish–American War, installed at Portland, Oregon's River View Cemetery, in the United States. The memorial is located near the cemetery's Southwest Taylors Ferry Road entrance where 165 headstones surround the statue. On Thanksgiving Day 2023 the statue was stolen from its pedestal.

== See also ==
- Spanish–American War Soldier's Monument, Portland, Oregon
