= Spanish–American War Soldier's Monument =

Sculpture and war memorial in Portland, Oregon

Spanish American War Soldier’s Monument
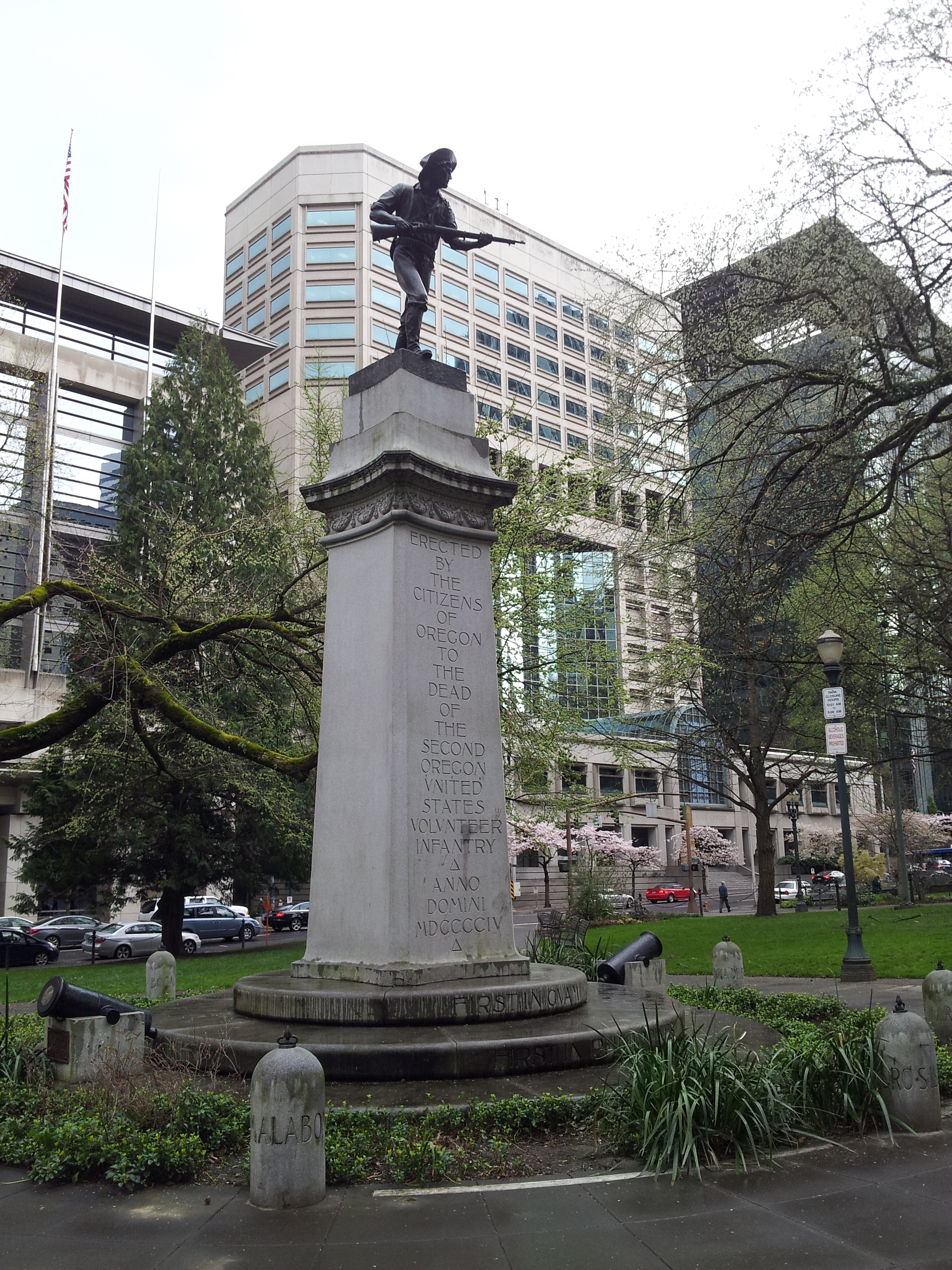
- The monument in 2015
- Artist: Douglas Tilden
- Year: 1906
- Type: Sculpture
- Medium: Bronze
- Location: Portland, Oregon, United States; 45.516088°N 122.677318°W

The Spanish–American War Soldier's Monument, also known as the Spanish–American War Memorial or simply Soldiers Monument, is an outdoor sculpture and war memorial monument honoring the dead of the 2nd Oregon Volunteer Infantry Regiment of the Spanish–American War and Philippine–American War. The monument was created by American artist Douglas Tilden and located in Lownsdale Square, in the Plaza Blocks of downtown Portland, Oregon. It features a bronze statue on a marble pedestal and granite base. The monument is part of the City of Portland and Multnomah County Public Art Collection courtesy of the Regional Arts & Culture Council.

== Description ==
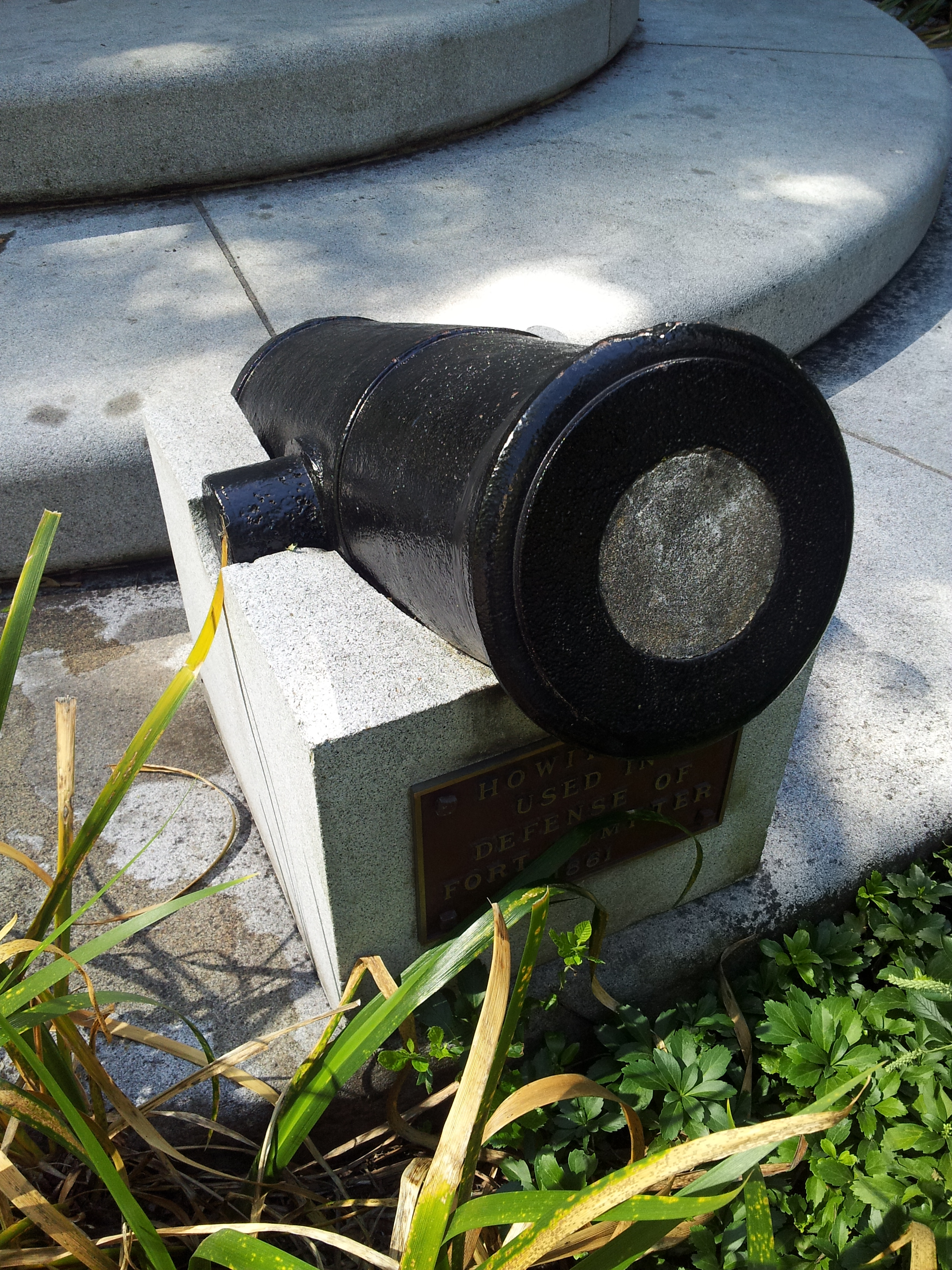
One of two Howitzer cannons collected in South Carolina and brought to Portland by Henry Dosch.

The memorial statue was designed by sculptor Douglas Tilden and installed in Lownsdale Square in Portland's Plaza Blocks in 1906 to honor the 2nd Oregon Volunteer Infantry Regiment troops who served in the Spanish–American War. It features two Howitzer cannons, set low to the ground, which were collected in 1902 by Henry E. Dosch. He was given permission by the War Department to bring them to Portland after he found them buried in sand in Charleston, South Carolina. There is also a bronze plaque which reads: "Howitzers fired in the defense of Fort Sumpter 1861".

== History ==
Plans for a monument to honor the dead of the 2nd Oregon Volunteers began early in 1899 with the sale of book subscriptions for $0.25 with a small percentage going toward the monument. The monument committee favored a design similar to one in honor of the 39th Pennsylvania Infantry at Gettysburg with a bronze statue and a marble pedestal. The committee also required that the base, shaft, and cornice be cut from a single piece of granite and remain in one piece. E.W. Wright, the Portland representative of a quarry in Barre, Vermont, received a contract for $8,000, and the stone was cut in Vermont from Barre Granite and shipped to Portland. A $5,000 contract was awarded for the statue. The weight of the pedestal was 64,000 pounds (29,000 kg), and when topped by the statue the height was about 30 feet (9.1 m).

== See also ==
- 1906 in art
- Spanish–American War Veterans Memorial, River View Cemetery
