= Construction of Arlington Memorial Bridge =

Aspect of bridge in Washington, D.C.

Coordinates: 38°53′14″N 77°3′20″W

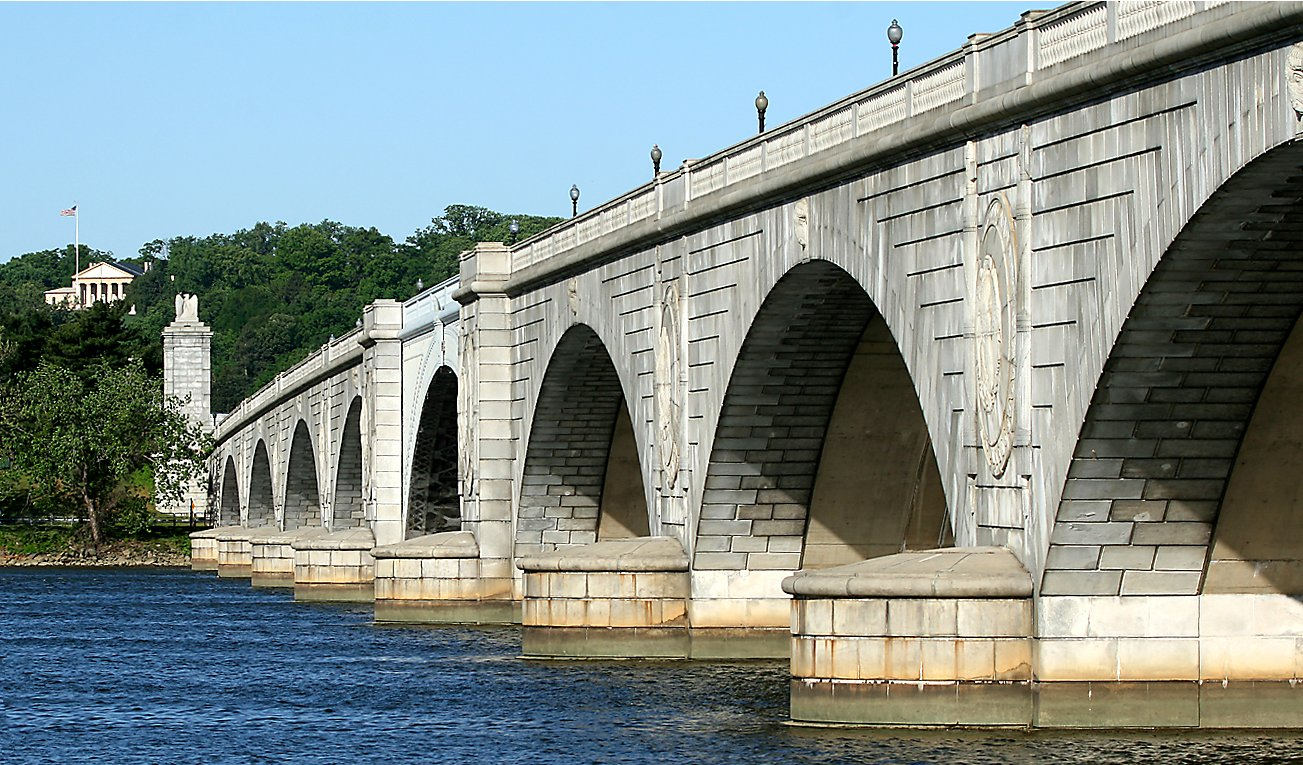
Looking west-northwest at Arlington Memorial Bridge

The construction of the Arlington Memorial Bridge across the Potomac River in Washington, D.C., the capital of the United States, lasted seven years. The bridge, designed by McKim, Mead, and White in a neoclassical style, was authorized by Congress in February 1925 and was completed in January 1932. As a memorial, its decorative features were extensive and intricate, and resolving the design issues over these details took many years. Tall columns and pylons topped by statuary, Greek Revival temple-like structures, and statue groups were proposed for the ends of the bridge. Carvings and inscriptions were planned for the sides of the bridge, and extensive statuary for the bridge piers.

The bridge itself took far longer than the anticipated two years. Problems were encountered in building the foundations, accidents occurred, and the construction of the bascule (or drawbridge) span was complex and lengthy. Construction of the termini and completion of the memorial details lasted until 1938, six years after the bridge opened. Budget problems created in part by the Great Depression meant that portions of the bridge project were never completed.

Construction of the bridge's western terminus involved extensively enlarging an island in the Potomac River, building bridges between this island and the Virginia mainland, building a new ceremonial entrance at Arlington National Cemetery, and creating a memorial drive to connect the cemetery to the bridge. The bridge's eastern approaches were equally as complex, and required construction of a plaza to the west of the Lincoln Memorial, connecting the bridge to the Rock Creek and Potomac Parkway, and building a "watergate" (marble steps) to given the public access to the river.

== Genesis and over-arching design of the Arlington Memorial Bridge ==
Congress first proposed a bridge at the site of the current Arlington Memorial Bridge on May 24, 1886. Numerous designs were suggested from official and unofficial sources, but no design was acceptable. On March 4, 1913, Congress enacted the Public Buildings Act which, among other things, created and funded an Arlington Memorial Bridge Commission (AMBC) whose purpose was to settle on a design for the bridge and report back to Congress. But Congress appropriated no money for the commission's operation due to the onset of World War I, and it remained inactive. In the wake of a major traffic jam on the Highway Bridge during the dedication of the Tomb of the Unknown Soldier, Congress appropriated $25,000 on June 12, 1922, to fund the work of the bridge commission.

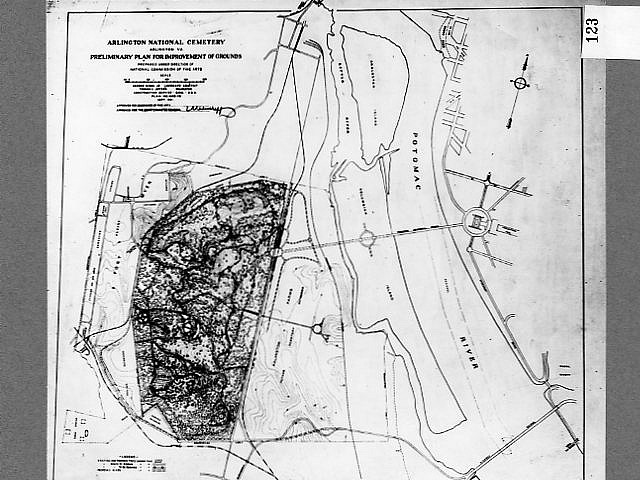
1921 plans for the Arlington Memorial Bridge, design of Columbia Island, and approaches.

In December 1922, the Arlington Memorial Bridge Commission held a joint meeting with the United States Commission of Fine Arts (CFA). The two agencies agreed to build a bridge from the west end of the National Mall to Arlington National Cemetery. The parties also agreed to seek to construct a low (rather than monumental) bridge with a bascule (drawbridge) in the center to permit ship traffic to reach the Georgetown waterfront.

The AMBC chose the architectural firm of McKim, Mead & White to design the bridge. Architect William Mitchell Kendall was the lead designer. Kendall's first design was submitted to the CFA in May 1923, and the basic bridge design—which included eastern and western approaches, a design for Columbia Island, a treatment for the main entrance at Arlington National Cemetery, and more—was given approval in late 1923.

Congress enacted legislation in early 1925 authorizing the AMBC to construct the bridge. Legal issues regarding the bridge commission's authority to issue contracts were resolved in early 1927, allowing construction to proceed. The goal was to construct a bridge from the Lincoln Memorial in Washington, D.C. across the Potomac River to Virginia, aligned with a new main gate at Arlington National Cemetery. The bridge was also to be memorial in nature, celebrating the unification of the country in the wake of the American Civil War, and thus was to have memorial features such as sculptural elements and grand approaches.

The United States Commission of Fine Arts (CFA) had legal authority to approve the design and architectural style of the bridge. However, the United States Army Corps of Engineers had legal authority over the construction of public works in the District of Columbia. These two bodies agreed in late 1923 to construct a nine-span, 2,138-foot (652 m) long drawbridge made of steel and reinforced concrete faced in white granite. The bridge required four abutments, one on each shoreline and one on either side of the draw (or bascule) span. The abutments had to be erected on bedrock. The bridge was relatively low to the water, which meant the roadway would be only 43 feet (13 m) and the underside of each span just 10 feet (3.0 m) above the low-water mark. The spans in the bridge sloped downward 12 feet (3.7 m), and all engines, gears, lookout stations, bridge tenders' houses, and other drawbridge equipment were as far out of sight below deck as possible. The spans varied in width from 166 feet (51 m) near the shore to 184 feet (56 m) at the draw span. The roadway was 60 feet (18 m) in width, and sidewalks (each 15 feet (4.6 m) in width) ran down each side of the bridge. A balustrade, 4,276 feet (1,303 m) long, was also planned. The balustrade was solid over the piers and abutments but turned spindles over the spans to permit maximum views of the river by motorists using the bridge.

Initially, there was little concern that the bridge's construction would be lengthy. Major Joseph Mehaffey of the Army Corps of Engineers stated in November 1925 that it would take two years to construct the abutments, two years to build the spans, and a year to erect the draw or bascule.

=== The eastern and western termini ===
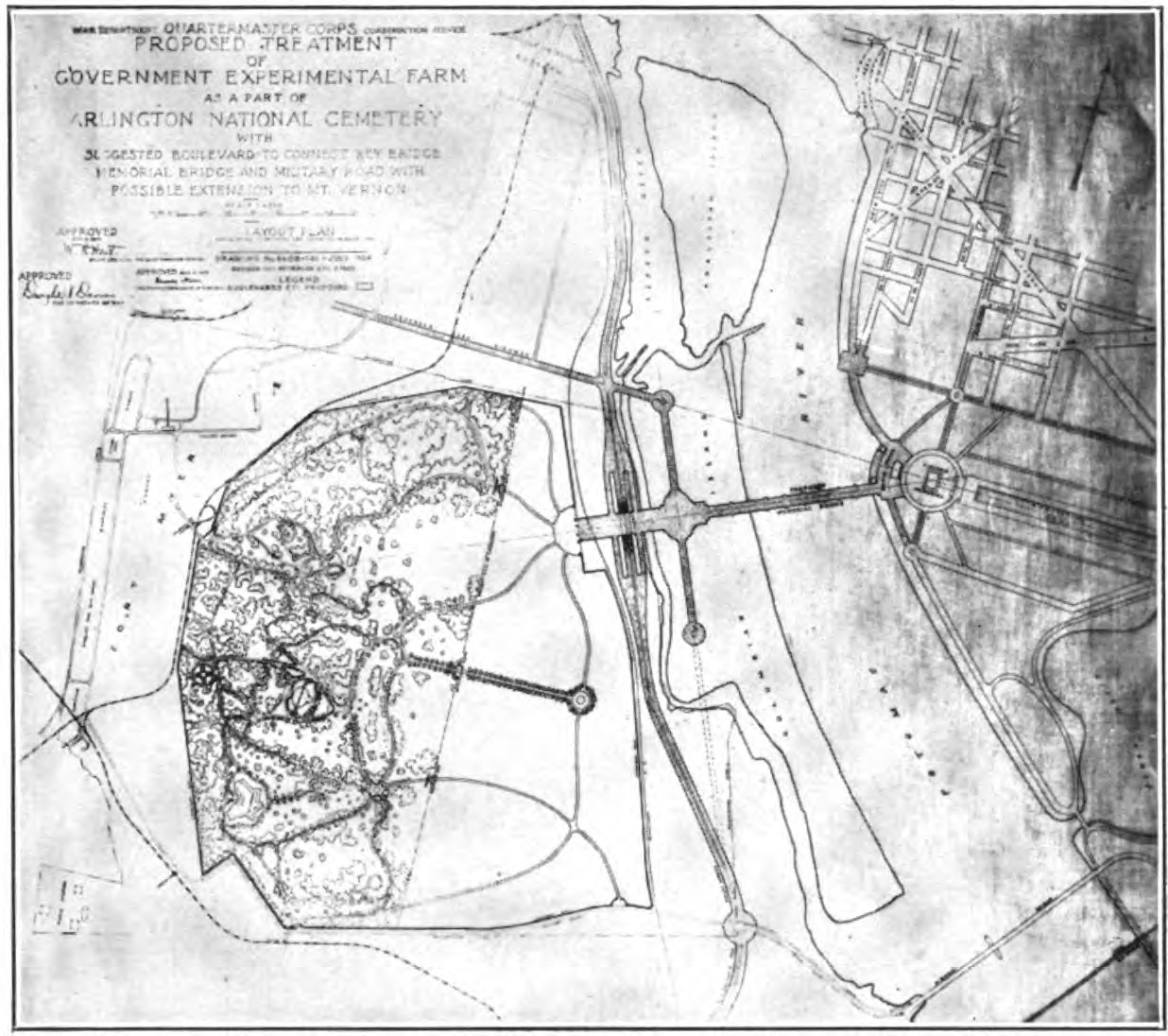
Original approved plan of 1926 for the design of Arlington Memorial Bridge's eastern and western approaches, and the treatment for the entrance to Rock Creek and Potomac Parkway.

The AMBC and CFA were not only concerned with constructing a bridge, but ensuring that the approaches to the bridge were appropriate for a grand memorial.

The eastern approaches consisted of the end of the bridge, a plaza, a watergate, and the streets which approached the bridge. For the bridge's entrance, the agencies approved two 40-foot (12 m) high pylons inscribed on all four sides with images representing national unity and common purpose. The agencies also planned major changes to B Street NW, a major D.C. city street funneling traffic to the bridge. B Street would be significantly widened to turn it into a vast ceremonial avenue, and its length extended past 23rd Street NW to the shore of the Potomac River (where a new pedestrian overlook would be constructed). B Street would also be connected to the Lincoln Memorial by a new road (now called Henry Bacon Drive). 23rd Street NW was also to be widened to provide a more grand north–south route to the Lincoln Memorial. These roads, along with Ohio Drive SW, came together west of the Lincoln Memorial, where Kendall proposed a large, granite and marble traffic plaza across which traffic would flow. Since Congress authorized construction of the Rock Creek and Potomac Parkway in March 1913 and principal construction began in 1923, a grand entrance to the parkway became part of the bridge project as well. Two 40-foot (12 m) high pylons with sculpture groups clustered about their bases were planned for this entrance.

Columbia Island would be the western terminus of the bridge. This would involve reshaping the island to some degree, and significantly raising it above its current height. Extensive new landscaping was needed once Columbia Island was terraformed. In the center of the island, the two agencies planned a vast granite plaza. Two 166-foot (51 m) high columns (inspired by the Colonne de Juillet in Paris, France) representing the North and South would be erected in the center of this space. Additional structures, not yet defined, were intended for the eastern shore of the island (flanking the bridge), and for the plaza. Because the goal of the bridge was to link Arlington National Cemetery with the District of Columbia, the AMBC and CFA planned a "bridge extension" across the Boundary Channel (the slight waterway which separated Columbia Island from the Virginia shore). A "memorial avenue" was planned from the bridge extension to the cemetery's main gate. An ornate ceremonial gateway would also be built at the cemetery's entrance as part of the bridge project.

Design considerations extended to the smallest details of the bridge. Slightly larger-than-life statues representing peaceful pursuits were planned for the top of each pier of the bridge. Sculptor Thomas Hudson Jones was commissioned early in the bridge planning process to design them. The AMBC and CFA agreed that on the side of each pier a 12-foot (3.7 m) wide bas-relief disc should be carved featuring an eagle. The border of the disc should be waves, and fasces of equal height should frame the disc to the right and left. Similarly, the keystone of each arch on each side of the bridge should be inscribed with a bas-relief bison head 6 feet (1.8 m) across. The design for the eagles proved controversial. The draft design for the sculptures showed some of the eagles facing right, and some facing left. This was publicly criticized by Lieutenant Colonel Thomas J. Dickson, a retired United States Army chaplain, who argued that left-looking eagles are "Mexican eagles". His public attack on the design led to a public rebuttal from the Army Corps of Engineers, who argued the eagles were ornamental and not heraldic.

== Designing the D.C. approaches ==
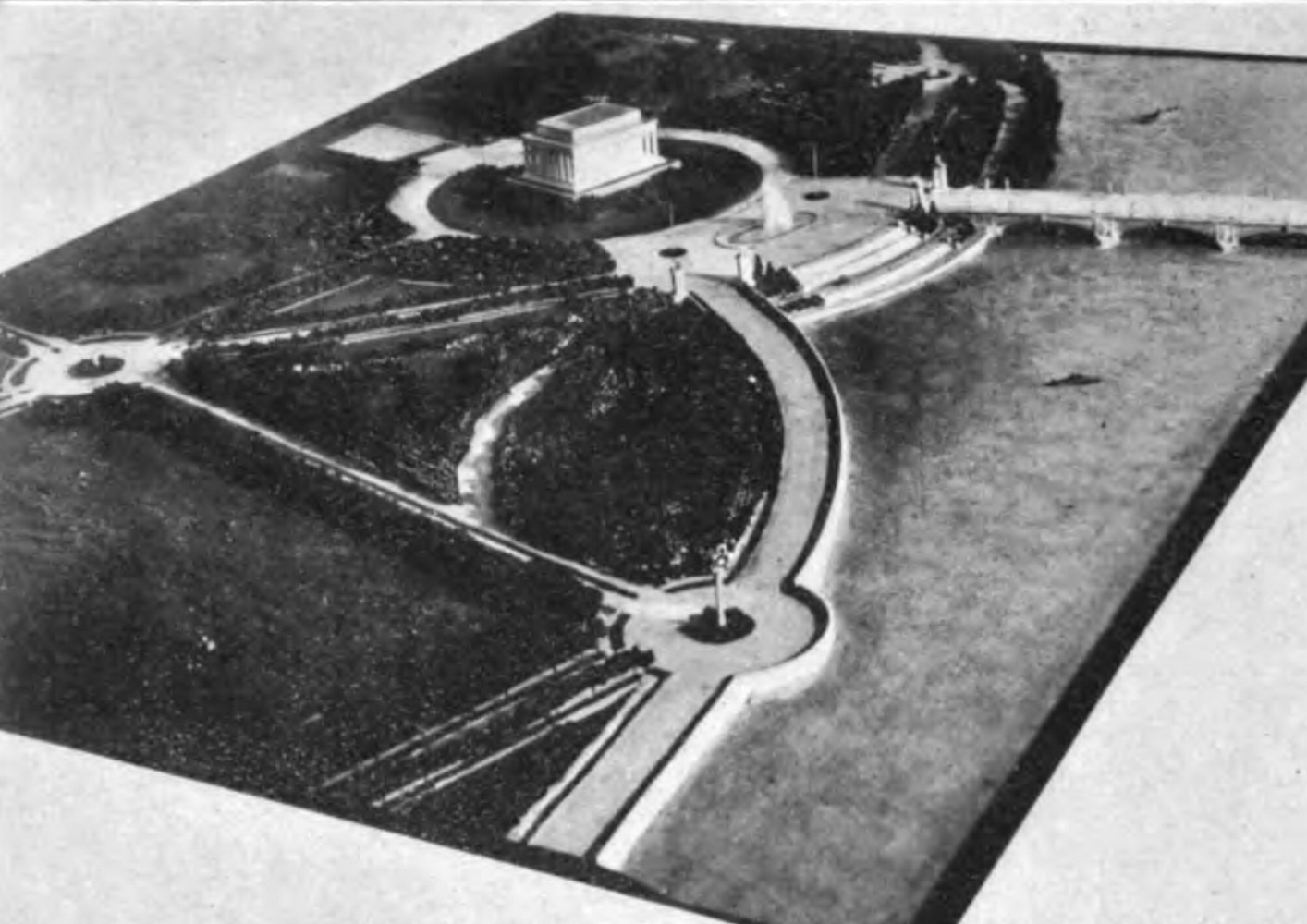
1926 model of the planned eastern approaches of the Arlington Memorial Bridge.

=== Parkway and bridge: Traffic circle or underpass ===
In May 1927, McKim, Mead & White architect William Mitchell Kendall presented preliminary designs for the D.C. approaches to Arlington Memorial Bridge. His refined plan addressed the B Street NW approach, the plaza west of the Lincoln Memorial, the "watergate" monumental steps from the plaza to the Potomac River. He also included a new sea wall along the shore of the river. The CFA recommended very strong design elements on the north end of the bridge.

But traffic problems complicated the CFA's deliberations. The National Capital Park and Planning Commission (NCPPC) had the legal authority to approve all transportation planning-related construction in the D.C. metropolitan area. Concerned with the impending construction of Federal Triangle, the NCPPC worried that the plaza traffic circle would not only fail to accommodate the expected increase in traffic volume but also impair the dignity of the memorial as large numbers of fast-moving automobiles whizzed around it. Lieutenant Colonel Ulysses S. Grant III, assigned to the Army Corps of Engineers and acting as Executive Officer of the AMBC, suggested that the Rock Creek and Potomac Parkway pass beneath the bridge via an underpass or beneath the plaza in a tunnel. Kendall was deeply upset by these suggestions, and argued that the traffic circle was a critical element of his plaza and watergate proposals. CFA members also resisted the idea, with CFA member James Leal Greenleaf arguing that the traffic issue was a red herring; new bridges would completely alleviate all traffic issues within 50 years, he said. Nonetheless, the CFA agreed to study Grant's traffic data.

By June 30, 1927, engineering drawings and specifications for the bridge itself were complete. Models of the bridge's piers went on public view in July. But the D.C. approaches were not. Grant's traffic data had not yet been fully analyzed by the CFA, and the commission was still studying the advisability of an underpass.

The CFA met again to discuss the D.C. approaches in September 1927. At this meeting, the CFA agreed that the Rock Creek and Potomac Parkway should be delinked from the plaza and pass through the Arlington Memorial Bridge via an underpass. But the CFA and Kendall continued to wrestle with the architectural and aesthetic implications of this decision. Kendall then submitted a revised design showing the parkway passing through a tunnel beneath the watergate steps. The CFA initially approved this design, but in December 1927 endorsed a new proposal to have parkway traffic pass through an underpass in the eastern abutment of the bridge.

The CFA submitted a revised plaza traffic circle plan to the AMBC in March 1928. The plan showed the parkway passing beneath the bridge in an underpass, and the AMBC approved the change on May 31. However, this meant that the bridge had to be 35 feet (11 m) longer, and the width of the watergate steps had to be shortened by a similar length. It also required a change in the engineering design of the bridge's superstructure and foundations—some of which had already been poured, and had to be torn out and replaced.

=== Parkway and plaza: Traffic circle or tunnel ===
The CFA agreed that Ohio Drive should be extended north...

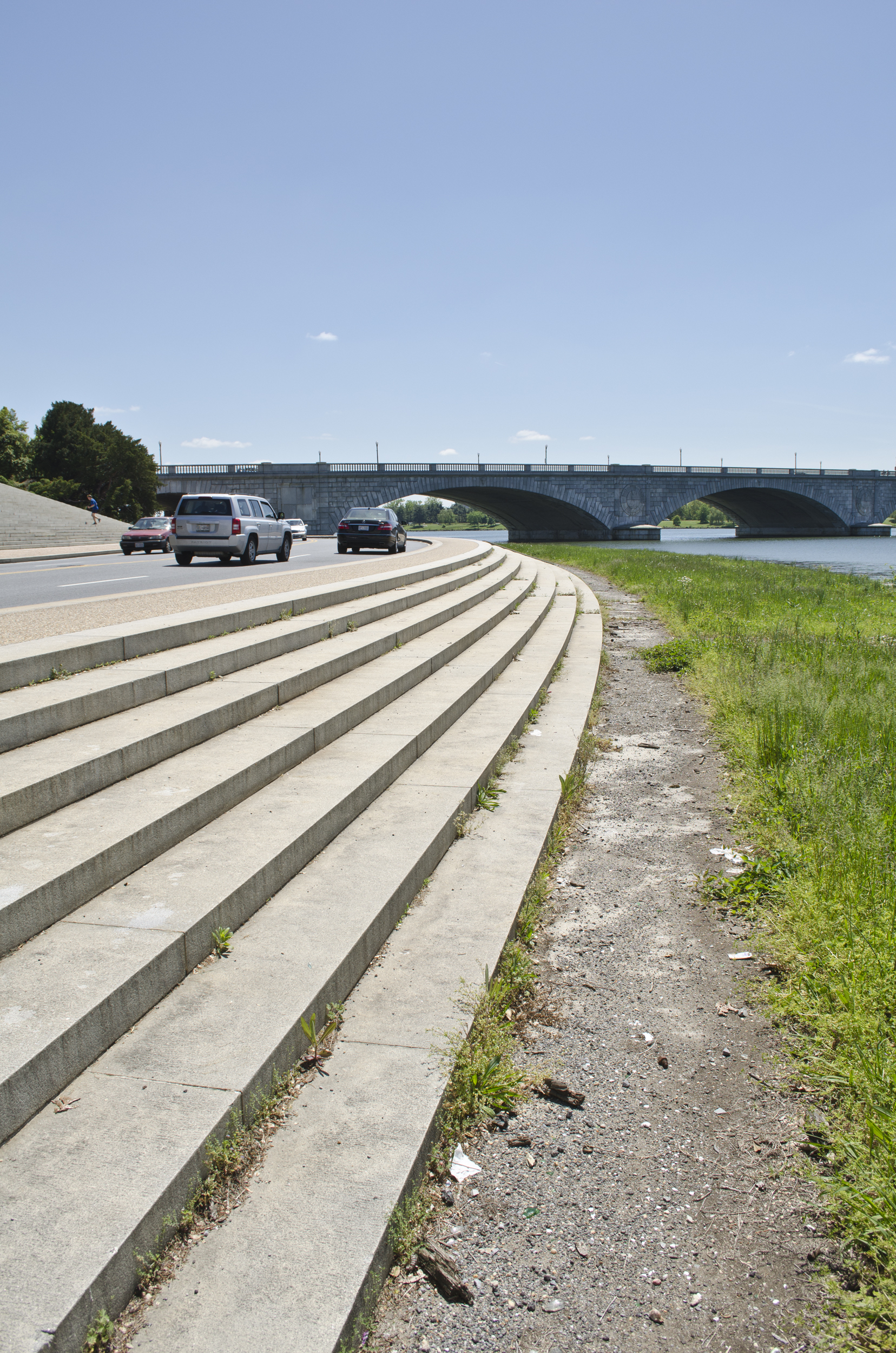
through an underpass in the Arlington Memorial Bridge...

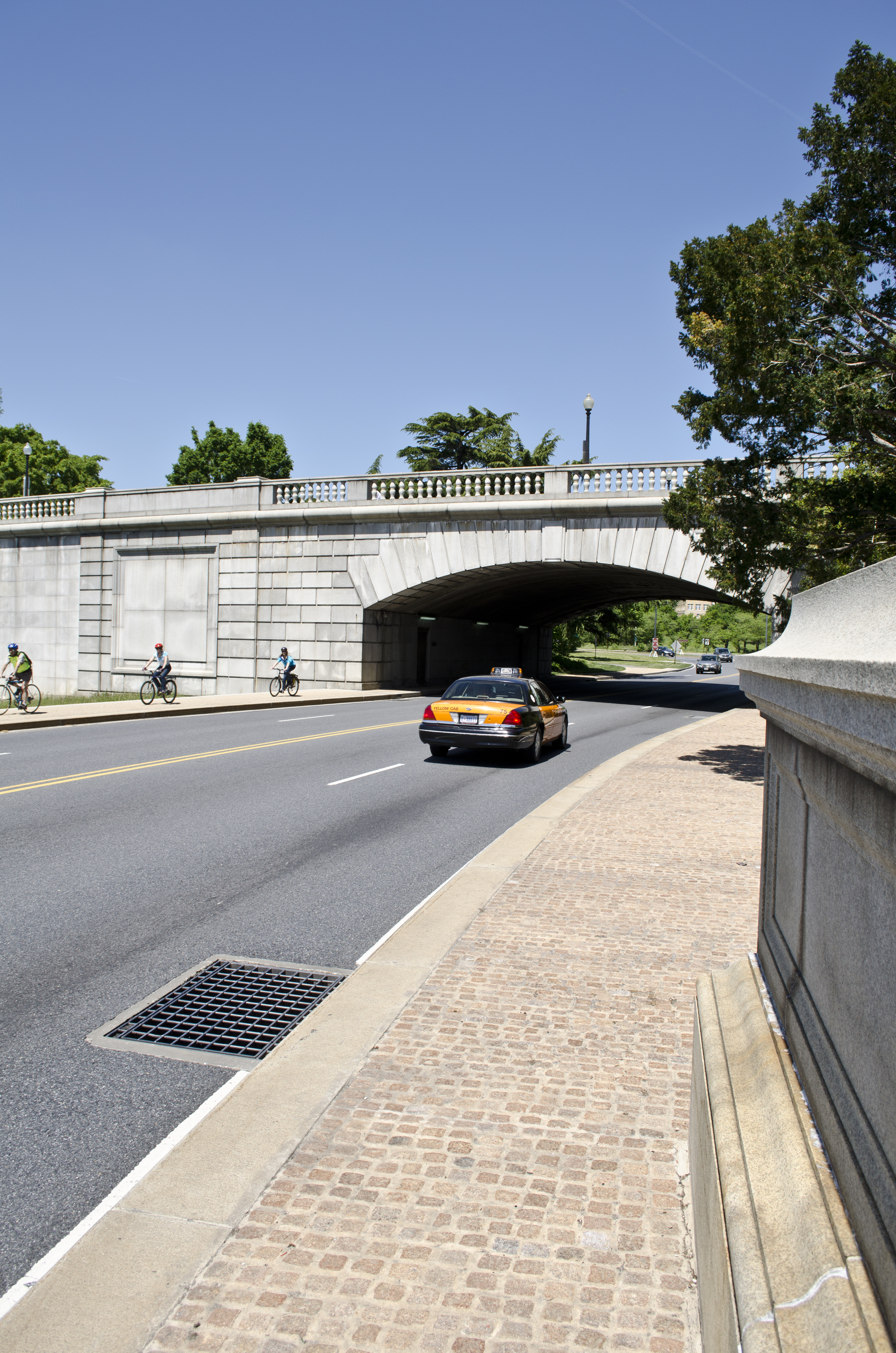
and through an underpass in the Rock Creek & Potomac Parkway.

The CFA to meet at the New York City offices of McKim, Mead & White on February 4, 1928. The commissioners gave their views on the draft designs for the bison-head sculptures to be carved into the keystones in the spans of the bridge. The AMBC announced that Hunkin-Conkey Construction of Cleveland, Ohio, had won the $1.5 million contract to build the bridge superstructure, while the North Carolina Granite Co. of Mount Airy, North Carolina, won the $42,000 contract to carve the sculptural granite.

But the main purpose of the February 4 meeting was to discuss the parkway again. Although the CFA had agreed on how the parkway was to get past the bridge, it had yet to consider whether parkway traffic should still cross the plaza via a traffic circle or whether it should bypass the plaza. Kendall continued to advocate that parkway traffic access the plaza. A tunnel seemed to be ruled out when Grant told the CFA that a tunnel would be too expensive. Grant suggested that, if the commission wished to delink the parkway from the plaza, it should consider two options. One would be to construct an uncovered tunnel through the watergate steps, providing pedestrian access via narrow bridges. Another would be to eliminate the steps completely, build a retaining wall, and have the parkway run along the shoreline below the wall.

Neither of Grant's options were completely satisfactory, so after the February 4 meeting the CFA hired aesthetics scholar William Ordway Partridge to consult on the issue. Partridge reported that the watergate steps were not integral to the plaza's design. Furthermore, he said, the National Park Service had closed the back side of the Lincoln Memorial to the public since Kendall's design had first submitted been submitted. There was no longer any need for watergate steps with this public access lacking, he said. Kendall hotly disputed Partridge's analysis, and again asserted that the steps were integral to the plaza's design. The CFA agreed to wait a month before making a decision.

The CFA discovered that it was divided internally and could not come to an agreement regarding the parkway and watergate steps. In April 1928, the CFA sponsored a special meeting to help resolve the issue. Held at the office of architect John Russell Pope in New York City, meeting attendees Pope and architects Cass Gilbert and Milton Medary; landscape architects Louis Ayres and Frederick Law Olmsted Jr.; Partridge; and representatives from McKim, Mead & White (MMW). Pope, Gilbert, Medary, Ayres, and Olmsted were all former members of the CFA. Medary and Olmsted were current members of the NCPPC, and Partridge represented Grant. MMW protested against deletion of steps, arguing they were integral to the design and encouraged boating and swimming. MMW again expressed its preference for a covered tunnel. CFA chair William Adams Delano sympathized with their concerns, but said a majority of CFA members questioned whether the steps should be included at all. Delano and Olmsted agreed that a tunnel would be aesthetically unpleasing, although Gilbert and CFA member Benjamin Wistar Morris said a tunnel was acceptable. Olmsted felt the plaza as a whole was a bad idea, and Medary opposed the steps as "stage scenery". Pope argued that the steps had to be retained in order to avoid building an ugly retaining wall. After lengthy discussion, the CFA agreed to retain the steps but reduce their width even further. The paved plaza was eliminated in favor of a grass one.

In a critical decision, the CFA decided that the parkway would no longer pass beneath the Arlington Memorial Bridge to connect with Independence Avenue SW south of the Lincoln Memorial. Instead, the parkway would end at the northwest arc of the Lincoln Memorial traffic circle. A partial cloverleaf interchange here would permit parkway traffic to access either Arlington Memorial Bridge or Ohio Drive SW. Ohio Drive SW would be extended north past Arlington Memorial Bridge and the parkway (via underpasses) very near the shoreline at a level below the plaza. It would cut through the watergate steps to connect with this interchange. Parkway traffic wishing to access Constitution Avenue NW could do so by passing around the Lincoln Memorial circle to Henry Bacon Drive or 23rd Street NW. Another partial cloverleaf interchange at the foot of Arlington Memorial Bridge would allow bridge traffic to access northbound Ohio Drive SW and on-ramps to the parkway, or (via the Lincoln Memorial traffic circle) 23rd Street SW and then either Independence Avenue SW or southbound Ohio Drive SW.

=== Finalizing the details of the bridge and its eastern approaches ===
With the basic design of the eastern plaza, parkway entrance, bridge entrance, and watergate now established, the CFA moved on to aesthetic details of these aspects of the Arlington Memorial Bridge project. It discussed the aesthetic design of the bridge approaches in April and May 1929, July 1930, and November 1930.

The lighting of the bridge now began to take up some of the CFA's time. The commission held a meeting on the unfinished bridge at night on November 7 to view mock-ups of some proposed lampposts. Kendall's design called for highly detailed carved granite lampposts. But the worsening federal budget situation made these problematic. The CFA discussed whether the lampposts had to be granite or whether wrought iron standards would serve just as well.

Other aesthetic issues also took up the commission time. During the November 7 meeting, the CFA discussed the placement and appearance of the proposed statues for the bridge piers. Inscriptions on the bridge were another vexing issue. The Kendall design called for a number of inscriptions from famous advocates of the bridge (such as President Andrew Jackson and Senator Daniel Webster) to be carved into the bridge itself and into the pedestals of statues on the bridge and at the bridge entrances. But the number of inscriptions, their placement, and quotations themselves had never been decided. It was not until February 1931 that the first quotation (from Daniel Webster) was approved.

The Arlington Memorial Bridge Commission tentatively approved aesthetic designs for the Rock Creek and Potomac Parkway approaches to the Arlington Memorial Bridge on February 9, 1931. Although not all design issues related to the plaza had been resolved, the partial cloverleaf and underpasses were now ready to move forward. The cost of their construction was estimated at $1.4 million.

The CFA further studied design problems facing the Lincoln Memorial and Columbia Island plazas in late September 1931. Many of these issues remained unresolved into February 1932, including the lamppost design.

Kendall and the CFA never agreed on lampposts for Arlington Memorial Bridge. A wide range of lighting schemes were suggested including gas, fluorescent, and neon lighting. Not lighting the bridge, or lighting it only in part or only on certain nights, was also considered. Kendall and the CFA agreed that the standard lamppost used in Washington, D.C., (an iron lighting standard designed by Frances D. Millet) should be used temporarily to improve safety on the bridge. These "temporary" lampposts remained in place into the 1990s.

== Construction ==
=== Early construction work: 1925 ===
Congress appropriated $500,000 on March 11, 1925, to begin construction on the bridge. The initial work (which began April 1) consisted of borings by the Corps of Engineers into the riverbottom to determine the type of rock below the sand and grit. The results of these borings were used to determine the parameters of the contracts for abutment and pier construction. Bedrock was found 48 feet (15 m) below the riverbottom, but drilling went 10 feet (3.0 m) further to be certain. The borings showed that, near Columbia Island, the bedrock was not flat but sloped downward. Construction companies blasted the bedrock and created a level surface. By late April, boring work moved to the D.C. shoreline. On-shore borings there were complete by mid-May, with off-shore borings just beginning.

Based on the boring work, Lieutenant Colonel Clarence O. Sherrill, Director of Public Buildings and Parks in Washington, D.C., declared that the bridge's construction would be simple and the structure would open in 1928 or early 1929.

Some work began even as the core borings were continuing. To raise the height of Columbia Island, in May the Army Corps of Engineers began dredging more than 2,500,000 cubic yards (1,900,000 m^{3}) of fill from the Potomac River. About 2,000 feet (610 m) of seawall and 15,000 feet (4,600 m) of levee were built around the island to stabilize this work. Altering the shape of the island began in September. About 40 acres (160,000 m^{2}) of the eastern part of the island were removed to enhance the flow of the Potomac River. This fill was also used to raise the island's elevation. By the end of the project, Columbia Island's mean elevation rose to 22 feet (6.7 m) from 6 feet (1.8 m). The project's total cost was $500,000.

Although Congress had not yet appropriated money for bridge construction, Comptroller General John R. McCarl permitted the AMBC to advertise and sign contracts. (However, the agency could not begin work, McCarl said, until the money was appropriated.) Engineers for the bridge were hired in September 1925. These included consulting engineer J.W. Douglas, chief designing engineer John Nagle, and assistant engineer for field construction Earl G. Marsh. Lieutenant Colonel Sherrill said that their work would take little time, and construction could begin by the end of 1925, and abutment and pier work should be complete by the end of the summer of 1926. Bids for the $3 million abutment and pier job were advertised in mid-November 1925.

=== Construction of the piers: 1926 ===
A major problem arose on January 6, 1926, when Comptroller General McCarl announced that the AMBC's contracts with McKim, Mead and White and with J.W. Douglas were illegal. McCarl pointed to a federal law which barred the government from hiring a general contractor. The AMBC, he said, must make the architect and the consulting engineer federal employees. The bridge commission decided to go ahead with the signing of construction contracts despite McCarl's decision, and met in special session on February 17, 1926, to decide what to do. At first, the commission believed that minor amendments to the contracts would suffice to placate McCarl, but they did not. The issue required congressional action. The Senate passed legislation exempting the AMBC from the civil service hiring requirement on March 9, 1926, but the House did not. However, the legislation was subsequently added as an amendment in the Independent Offices appropriations bill, which passed both houses and was signed into law.

As the 69th United States Congress began to wind down its second session in January and February 1927, there was concern that the 1926 legislation was not adequate. The Senate passed an appropriations bill containing new civil service hiring exemption language, but in the House the amendment was ruled out of order. However, Representative William R. Wood argued that the 1926 legislation remained valid as it contained no language limiting the exemption to just the 1927 fiscal year. All the same, the House unanimously passed an exemption amendment on January 14, and the legislation was enacted into law.

Construction on Arlington Memorial Bridge began in March 1926 after Congress appropriated $2.5 million in fiscal year 1927 construction funds. A $1.3 million contract to construct the abutments and piers was awarded to the H.P. Converse Company of Boston, Massachusetts, on January 28. Work began on March 15. On May 4, a $1.615 million contract was awarded to the North Carolina Granite Co. for the provision of granite for the sidewalks, balustrades, and masonry facing of the piers, and a $207,000 contract given to the Stone Mountain Granite Corp. of Stone Mountain, Georgia, for granite for the bridge's substructure. The substructure granite was delivered by June 30, 1927, and 125 railroad cars of granite for the superstructure arrived shortly thereafter.

Work on the bridge began on the D.C. side, moving toward Virginia. By June 30, steel sheets were driven into the riverbottom to allow construction of the cofferdams for Abutment No. 1, Pier No. 1, and Pier No. 2, and excavation was under way on Abutment No. 1 and Pier No. 1. The first load of granite (from Stone Mountain) arrived on July 31. To accommodate the immense quantities of stone being used, the AMBC contracted with the G.B. Mullin Co. to build a stoneyard on the Virginia shoreline. The Rosslyn Connecting Railroad built a spur from the Rosslyn Branch of the Pennsylvania Railroad to the stoneyard. A 40-short-ton (36 t) crane, on loan from the War Department and mounted on a railroad car, was used to unload and handle granite in the stoneyard, and another 3,500 feet (1,100 m) of siding constructed in the yard to maneuver railroad cars about.

Concrete for the bridge was first poured on September 23, 1926, for Abutment No. 1 and Pier No. 1. Concrete work on these structures continued into November. Construction of the cofferdam for Pier No. 3 began in mid-November. About this time, engineers began expressing concern that the granite facing would prove so heavy that the concrete in the arches would deform, causing the bridge to collapse. But studies published in November 1926 showed that not only would the granite facings be supported, the weight of the roadway superstructure actually helped strengthen the arches. This meant the spans did not need to be as massive as previously thought, and more than $25,000 in concrete was saved.

Potentially major changes to the bridge arose in late 1926. On December 27, the Army revealed its plan to allow Arlington National Cemetery to expand eastward past Arlington Ridge Road to the tracks of the Pennsylvania Railroad. This made it unclear whether there would be room for the Boundary Channel bridges, Memorial Avenue, and new ceremonial gate for the cemetery, and extensive restudy of the Virginia approaches to the bridge was undertaken. Lieutenant Colonel Grant worried that the bridge itself might need lengthening past Columbia Island to the Virginia shoreline (which would have required adding a span), and he asked McKim, Mead & White to study this issue.

=== Construction of the piers and spans: 1927 ===
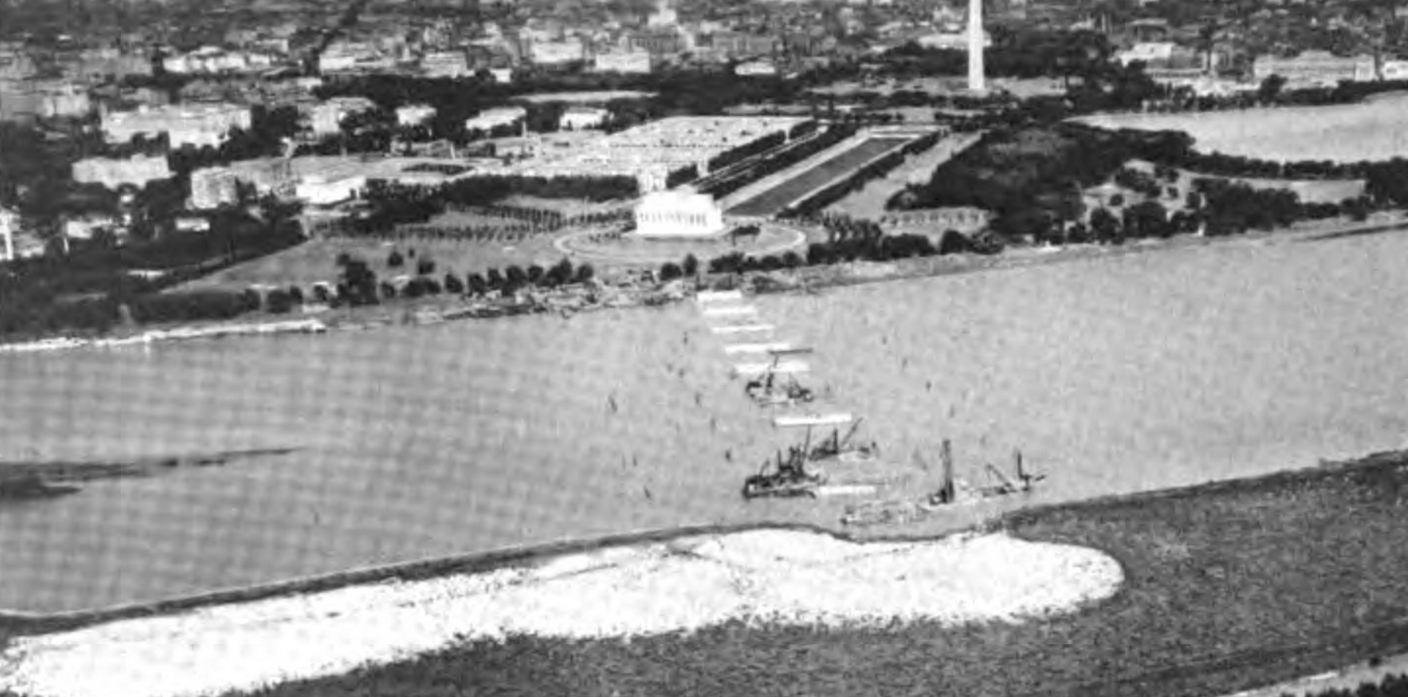
Construction on Arlington Memorial Bridge in 1927

Work on the abutments and piers proceeded quickly. By late 1926, the steel forms for the pouring of Cofferdam No. 1 (the nearest to the D.C. shoreline) had been removed, and the steel for Cofferdam No. 3 was being driven. Concrete was being poured for Pier No. 2 and for the D.C. shoreline abutment.

By mid-March, the steel had been driven for Abutment No. 2 (the eastern abutment for the bascule span), and the concrete pouring for Pier No. 2 was finished. The steel sheets were removed from Pier No. 2 and used to create the forms for Pier No. 4. Abutment No. 1 (on the D.C. shoreline) had risen to just 9 feet (2.7 m) below mean low water level, and Pier No. 1 and Pier No. 2 were just 7 feet (2.1 m) below mean low water level. Granite facing for Pier No. 1 was being installed, and Corps officials said that the last pier should be completed by the end of 1927 — about the time that half of the superstructure was done.

As construction continued, several decisions were made which enhanced the bridge's structural strength. The granite voussoirs in the spans were thickened so that each span could now form a true arch. A concrete wall was also added to the end of each span, which supported not only the roadway superstructure but also the walls of each spandrel. Each spandrel wall was now 94 feet (29 m) wide. This significantly increased the dead load as well as strengthened the bridge, and allowed the bridge to be 2 feet (0.61 m) higher than planned. These changes also meant that each of the outer lanes of the bridge could now carry 40 short tons (36 t).

A managerial change also led to significant cost savings. Originally, the AMBC used a general contractor. But it changed this practice in 1927, dividing the work into smaller contracts. This meant that smaller firms could now compete for the contracts. With more firms bidding, many bids came in lower than expected. Financing costs were also reduced, and the cost-plus contract of the general contractor eliminated. The speed of work also increased, which led to lower costs over the long run.

By June 30, 1927, about 70 percent of the substructure was complete. Abutments No. 1 and No. 2 and Piers No. 1, No. 2, No. 3, and No. 4 were constructed up to 10 feet (3.0 m) below the mean water line (where the granite masonry was to begin), and some granite facing was in place. The cofferdam for Pier No. 6 and Abutment No. 4 had been driven to bedrock, and Abutment No. 4 excavated. Steel sheeting for Abutment No. 3 began to be driven and the wooden guides for the steel sheeting for Pier No. 5 were in place in late June.

Congress authorized $2.5 million to be spent on the bridge between July 1, 1927, and June 30, 1928. That same month, C. Paul Jennewein was awarded a contract to design the 8-foot (2.4 m) tall eagles which would be sculpted on each pier. Jennewein also won the contract to design bison heads for the arch keystones. At the end of July, the government learned that the H.P. Converse Co. was forcing its workers to begin the workday several hours early. Lieutenant Colonel Grant reprimanded the firm, and enforced the federal eight-hour day law. In late August, the federal government advertised contracts for the carving of the bison heads on the keystones and the fasces on the piers. Bids for this contract were opened in September 1928. However, the single bid came in too high, and the contract was split in two. This time, the bids were low enough, and in January 1928 North Carolina Granite Co. was awarded both contracts.

The bridge commission advertised bids for construction of the superstructure in October 1927. The following month, Stone Mountain Granite completed delivery of the granite for the substructure facing. By December, North Carolina Granite had delivered about 68 percent of the superstructure granite. The contract for construction of the superstructure was awarded to Hunkin-Conkey Construction Co. that same month.

=== Construction of the foundations: 1928 ===
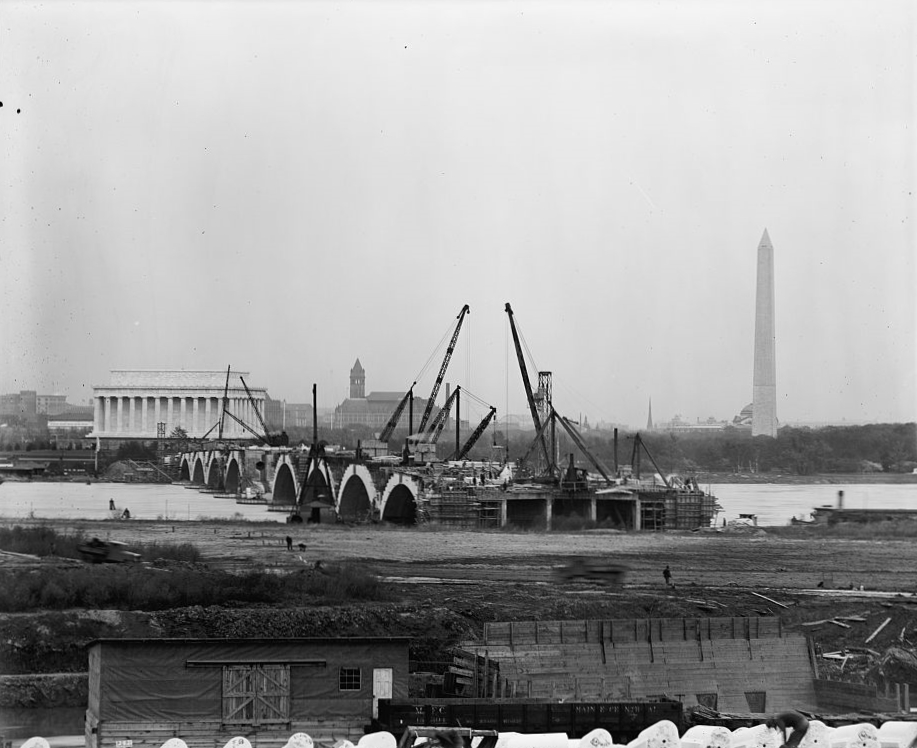
Arlington Memorial Bridge construction in 1928

At the end of January 1928, construction of the foundations for the abutments and piers was complete. The AMBC and H.P. Converse Co. signed a supplemental contract to raise the piers to 15 feet (4.6 m) above the average low water level from 10 feet (3.0 m). This work was largely finished by late February, and the Hunkin-Conkey Construction Co. began pouring concrete for the arches in April 1928. By June 30, the four arches on the eastern side had been poured and the centering frames below them removed. Additionally, the foundations on the eastern and western ends of the bridge were about 50 percent complete, and much of the granite placed on top of Piers No. 1, No. 2, and No. 3. This meant about 20 percent of the superstructure was now complete.

A major flood struck the D.C. area in May 1928. Although the floodwaters topped the unfinished piers, there was no damage.

Aesthetic issues regarding Columbia Island appeared to finally be resolved by the CFA in mid-1928. In May, after nearly three years of work, the commission finalized its plans for the design of Columbia Island. The design featured a huge central plaza with a traffic circle around the edge. Two 40-foot (12 m) high columns framed Arlington Memorial Bridge as it terminated on the island. Two more 40-foot (12 m) columns stood on either side of the roadway exiting the western side of the plaza, and two more 40-foot (12 m) high columns framed the roadway's termination at Arlington Ridge Road. At the base of each column was a massed sculptural group reflecting the unification of North and South, the achievement of national goals, and personifications of national values. One or more large Neoclassical structures were also placed on Columbia Island. The architectural style of this structure (or structures) had not yet been worked out, but it was agreed that something should be built. The CFA envisioned a Neoclassical temple-like structure in the center of the plaza, but other proposals were for two smaller temple-like structures on either side of the bridge (facing east). The CFA's plans called for yet more changes to the physical structure of Columbia Island, so that the main axis of the island ran along a north–south line through the center of the grand plaza.

By June 30, 1928, the carving of the bison heads for the span keystones and the fasces for the piers was nearly complete. These items were fashioned in studios and later installed on the bridge. The eagle disks, however, were carved in place, which meant their manufacture had to wait until the bridge was nearly complete.

The first major accident to occur during construction of Arlington Memorial Bridge happened on July 31, 1928. A 110-foot (34 m) tall steel crane on the D.C. abutment snapped while pulling steel sheeting from the riverbed and killed 36-year-old worker Roy Deavers. Four of the other 325 men at work on the bridge at the time were injured. A month later, on September 5, a fierce thunderstorm wrecked a concrete mixer on the site. Despite the two accidents, AMBC officials said that concrete for all the arches would be poured by late October. Work on the bridge was six to eight months ahead of schedule, the commission said, and the bridge was on track for completion in the winter of 1930–1931.

=== Construction of the superstructure, watergate, and eastern approaches: 1929 ===
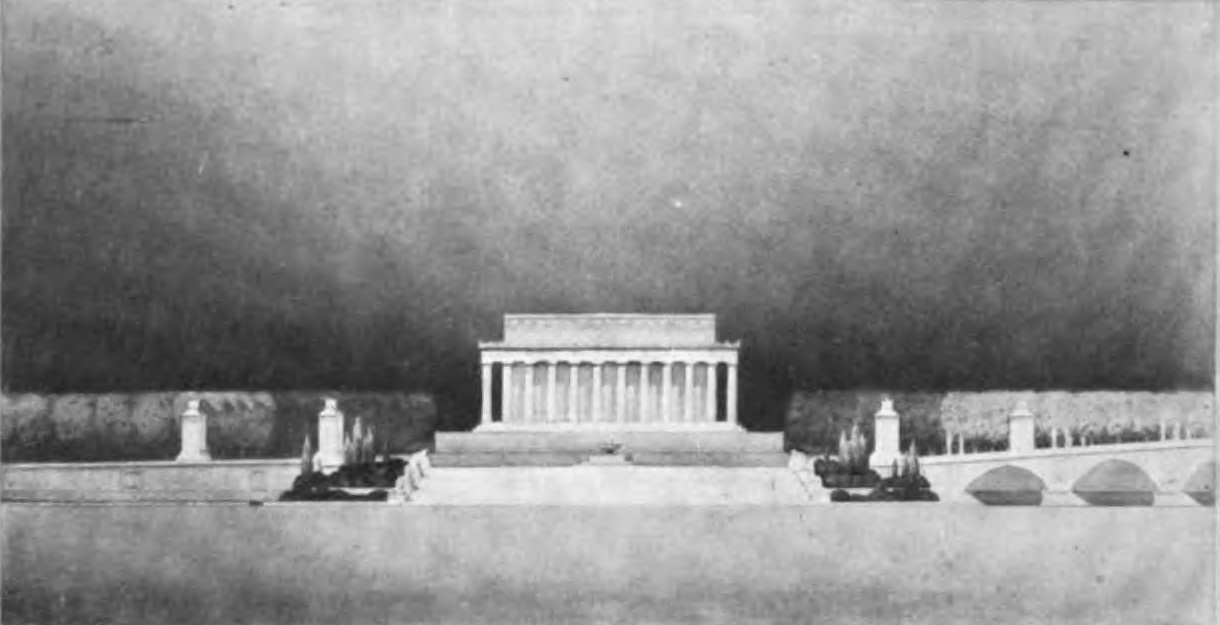
Original design for the eastern approaches, showing the two sets of pylons and the main watergate.

Construction of the Arlington Memorial Bridge superstructure continued through 1929. There was a serious delay, however, when in the spring of 1929 the H.P. Severin Co. discovered an unstable rock shelf 13 feet (4.0 m) thick under the western abutment of the Arlington Memorial Bridge. This "rotten rock" had not been revealed by borings two years earlier. Additionally, a thin layer of sand and gravel was discovered under the eastern abutment of the main bridge. Both had to be removed and the abutments stabilized before construction could proceed further. This work caused extensive delay in the bridge's completion.

Work on Columbia Island and the D.C. approaches continued, however. The CFA approved the placement of the two 40-foot (12 m) pylons at the Columbia Island terminus of the bridge in March 1929. But it was no closer to finalizing the details of the Columbia Island plaza and roadway. The complicating issue was the Mount Vernon Memorial Parkway, a major new highway to be built along the Virginia shore of the Potomac River. This parkway was approved by Congress in May 1928, and it was designed to link Mount Vernon, Virginia (George Washington's home) with the Arlington Memorial Bridge. Although some civic groups, businessmen, and civic planners wanted the parkway to run along a series of inland ridges and then turn east to the bridge, the favored route was a shoreline one that would require extensive land reclamation south of Columbia Island as well as new roadways and bridges on the island. (The shoreline route was approved in January 1929.)

How the parkway should look as it neared the bridge, how to link it to the bridge approaches, and how it should exit Columbia Island were new and complicated issues that involved not just aesthetics but transportation and civil engineering expertise the CFA did not have. In March 1929, the CFA and NCPPC (which had this staff expertise) agreed to study the problems together. CFA member and landscape architect Ferruccio Vitale was assigned to study whether the planned connection between Arlington National Cemetery and Columbia Island was affected. Vitale was instructed to consult with Major General Benjamin Franklin Cheatham Jr., the U.S. Army Quartermaster General, whose department managed the cemetery.

Meanwhile, work on the eastern approaches was beginning. Initial contracts for ground clearing and preparation were awarded in mid-April. The Grier-Lowrance Construction Company won a $328,700 contract in late May to begin excavating the foundations for the watergate and eastern terminus grassy plaza. The contract specified that the work had to be completed in 200 days. Bids for the construction of the watergate, eastern terminus, grassy plaza, and approaches from the Rock Creek and Potomac Parkway were solicited in June 1929. These projects were estimated to cost $1.6 million. By the end of June, excavation of the foundations for the grassy plaza and watergate were nearly finished. Grier-Lowrance then began work on the cofferdams that would allow construction of the foundation for the parkway approaches.

Work on the bridge's abutments resumed once stability issues were addressed, and the two structures were almost complete by mid-1929. The H.P. Converse Company finished the western abutment (except for exterior masonry facing) in June, and construction raised the eastern abutment to just 3 feet (0.91 m) below the average low water level. The North Carolina Granite Co. delivered the last of the granite for the superstructure in late June, and Hunkin-Conkey completed the eastern half of the bridge's superstructure except for erection of the balustrade and pointing of the granite. The concrete work and most of the granite work on the western superstructure was also nearly complete.

As this work progressed, two more accidents occurred. On May 10, 27-year-old Benjamin Ramos fell about 10 feet (3.0 m) and fractured his skull. On June 22, 22-year-old John Beck fell 30 feet (9.1 m) and was impaled on an iron rod. Both men survived.

Bids for the $500,000 eastern terminus grassy plaza and watergate construction project were opened on July 29 and awarded to the National Construction Co. of Atlanta, Georgia, in August 1929. By December, the seawall and the watergate steps were finished, and National Construction also was well advanced in constructing the parkway's underpass and its approaches to the bridge.

Construction of the bridge (apart from the roadway) largely ended by November 1929, when Hunkin-Conkey finished the masonry facing. The only work which remained was the carving of the eagles on the piers and some carving on the abutments.

=== Construction of the eastern approaches and Columbia Island plaza: 1930 ===
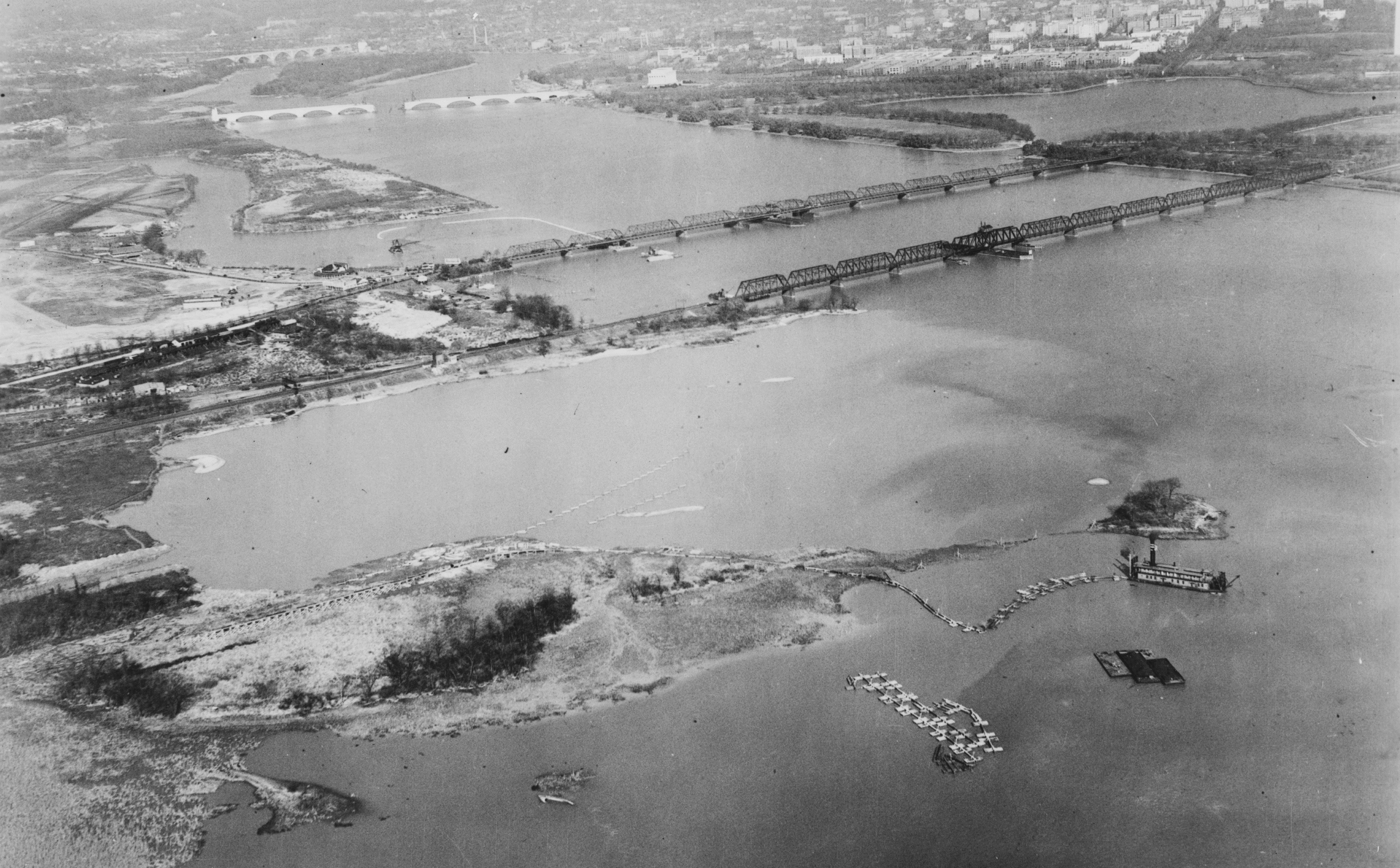
Dredging operations in the Potomac River in 1930. Note the floating pontoons which outline the soon-to-be-completed land which will define the Pentagon Lagoon, and the unfinished central bascule span in Arlington Memorial Bridge.

In January 1930, Congress appropriated $58,270 to begin construction of the roadways on Columbia Island connecting Arlington Memorial Bridge to Arlington National Cemetery.

A major fire broke out on the western terminus of the bridge on March 12. The cause of the fire, which erupted at about 5:30 P.M., was unknown but it was very large and required five fire companies and a District of Columbia Fire Department fire boat to put it out. The fire completely destroyed the wood frames constructed for the pouring of concrete for the western abutment, and caused the partial collapse of the westernmost span. Severn Construction Co., the contractor working on that end of the bridge, said all the concrete for the abutment and the span was damaged and would have to be ripped out and replaced. There was no damage, however, to the granite masonry. Since no insurance was carried on the bridge, Severn Construction bore the $10,000 loss.

Work continued on the rest of the bridge despite the fire. The contract for the sculpting of the eagles was awarded in March 1930 to the firm of Grenci and Ellis of Peekskill, New York. Freestanding eagles for placement atop four pylons on Columbia Island were included in the contract. By late October, sculpting of the eagles and fasces on the Arlington Memorial Bridge were under way. The sculptural eagles for the pylons were also being fabricated. The foundations for the watergate and eastern terminus plaza were also almost complete by March.

The contract for the placement of granite on the eastern terminus plaza and eastern approaches was awarded to the John Swenson Granite Co. of Concord, New Hampshire, and to the North Carolina Granite Co. Shipments of granite began arriving immediately afterward, and a stoneyard was constructed just south of B Street NW near the Lincoln Memorial to receive it. Granite arrived via rail at the Baltimore and Ohio Railroad freight yard on K Street NW, and was trucked to the site. A 9 short tons (8.2 t) crane unloaded the stone on B Street. Nearly all the granite was on-site by June 30.

In late June, the AMBC advertised contracts for the construction of fenders around the piers. (Fenders are large structures of wood filled with soft earth designed to protect the piers if they are accidentally rammed by passing ships.) The contracts were not immediately let, however. The Army Corps of Engineers said in July that it needed more time to study the type of fender to be built.

Two more accidents occurred on the bridge in July. George Rossman, a 31-year-old iron worker, fractured his back on June 30 when steel pilings being removed from one of the piers fell on him. Twelve days later, 31-year-old apprentice Albert Canter died after plunging 30 feet (9.1 m) from the superstructure to a barge.

Additional improvements were also made to Columbia Island. Congress appropriated $11,200 in late June 1930 so that 370,000 cubic yards (280,000 m^{3}) of fill could be dredged from the Potomac River adjacent to the island. This fill was used to construct and maintain levees on the island and protect it from flooding. The work began immediately and was scheduled for completion in the fall. Part of the work included removing a triangular piece of shoreline between the Rock Creek and Potomac Parkway and the eastern abutment so that the view of the bridge from the parkway would not be blocked.

With studies for the Mount Vernon Memorial Parkway (soon to be renamed the George Washington Memorial Parkway) complete, Grant submitted revised plans for the island in mid September. These included new designs for the great plaza and its pylons, for the bridge's island western approaches, and for the new ceremonial entrance gate at Arlington National Cemetery.

AMBC officials said in November 1930 that Arlington Memorial Bridge would be all but complete in January 1931. All that remained was the surfacing of the roadway and regrading of roads on the Virginia side. The placement of topsoil on Columbia Island was proceeding quickly, and would be complete in time for spring. The type of surfacing for the bridge roadway was under review by the end of the year.

=== Finishing the bridge: 1931 ===
As the bridge entered its final year of construction, the CFA continued to discuss the design of the Columbia Island pylons and other final touches to the bridge. But budget matters largely made the CFA's deliberations moot. The AMBC announced that the bridge was $780,000 above its $14.5 million budget. This was largely due to the raising the spans, removing the bad rock and sand beneath the abutments, and other structural changes which added more than $4.5 million in additional costs. By not carving statues for the Boundary Channel Bridge or the Arlington Memorial Bridge piers and by eliminating all balustrades, statuary, and buildings on Columbia Island, the budget overruns were minimized.

On January 22, President Herbert Hoover inspected the nearly-complete bridge.

On February 9, the CFA finally approved the design for the approaches of the Rock Creek and Potomac Parkway. The entire project was expected to cost $1.4 million. The AMBC said bids for the first $500,000 of granite would be opened March 4. The AMBC also began work on linking Columbia Island to the Virginia mainland by advertising bids for the construction of an underpass to carry the Pennsylvania Railroad beneath Memorial Drive.

Contracts were awarded on March 4 for the granite for the $900,000 Arlington National Cemetery gateway (the Hemicycle). The North Carolina Granite Co. won a $185,000 contract for the Hemicycle wall, the New England Granite Works won a $72,000 contract for the balustrades, the John Swenson Granite Co. won a $244,500 contract for the gates and pylons, and the New England Granite Co. won a $45,000 contract for the curb stones and stairs. Work on the gate was to begin on July 1.

By late summer, nearly all the work on Arlington Memorial Bridge was complete. On August 19, the contracts for paving the bridge roadway with granite blocks were advertised. The bridge was structurally complete on September 7. Grant said placement of the granite surface would begin immediately, but that the bridge would not open until early 1932 "because there is nothing to open it to".

=== Opening the bridge and adding finishing touches: 1932 ===
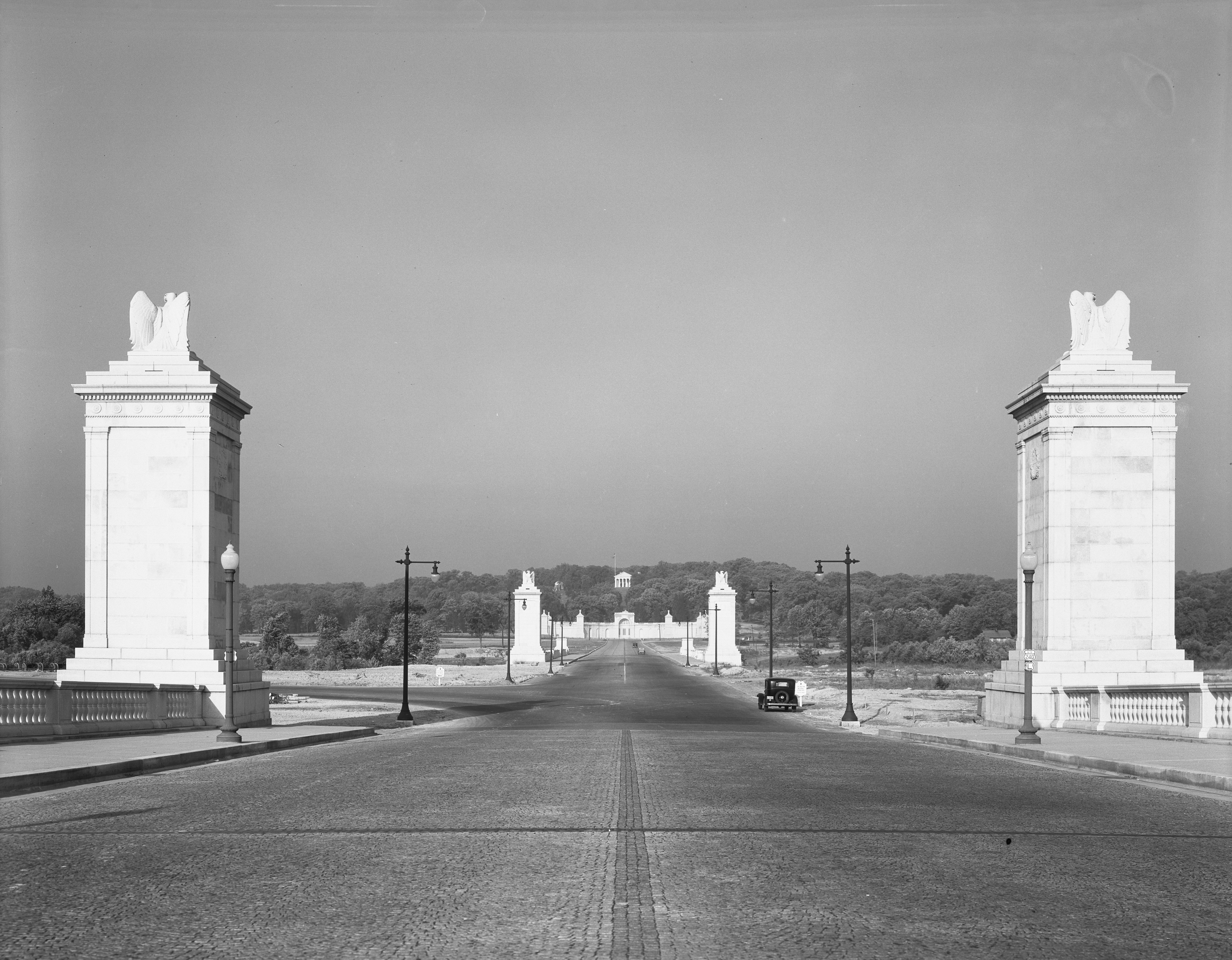
Northern end of Columbia Island shortly after its completion in 1932. The only roads visible are the connecting central axis road to the George Washing Memorial Parkway (left) and the Boundary Channel Bridge (showing completed and incomplete pylons) to Memorial Drive and Arlington National Cemetery in the distance.

Arlington Memorial Bridge was informally dedicated in January 1932. Grant and members of the Arlington Memorial Bridge Commission inspected the bridge on January 14. On January 16, President Hoover, First Lady Lou Henry Hoover, and members of the AMBC, CFA, NCPPC, and D.C. office of the Army Corps of Engineers informally dedicated the bridge by driving over its length. Although only one lane in each direction was open, the caravan of 12 automobiles traveled from the White House to the bridge, and then across the bridge to the entrance of Arlington National Cemetery and back again. The same day, the George Washington Memorial Parkway opened to traffic.

Arlington Memorial Bridge opened on January 17, 1932. However, access was limited to Saturdays and Sundays from 8:00 A.M. to 5:00 P.M. Nearly 31,000 vehicles traversed the $21 million bridge the day it opened to the public. The first funeral procession to Arlington National Cemetery to cross the bridge did so on January 18, the second day the bridge was open.

Work continued on finishing minor details of bridge and its approaches after the structure went into use. Projects included the grassy plaza on Columbia Island, widening and extension westward of Constitution Avenue, widening of 23rd Street NW, the paving of Memorial Avenue, and the Hemicycle. Design work for plaza statuary also continued. In mid-March 1932, 200 American elms were transplanted around the Lincoln Memorial to improve the landscaping around the bridge approaches.

More lanes on the bridge were open by early April. There were delays in opening the Pennsylvania Railroad underpass, however, and debates about the best type of paving for Memorial Drive continued—and it remained a gravel road. But the AMBC was moving forward on completing the Hemicycle, and the commission said bids for placement of granite would be awarded within a month.

Funding cuts stopped much of the remaining work on the bridge. On April 7, the House of Representatives deleted the entire $840,000 appropriation for completing the Arlington Memorial Bridge project. The funding cut meant that no further work could be done on the Columbia Island great plaza nor any decorative statuary added to it. The Memorial Drive work, however, received funding from other sources, which allowed paving of it to move forward. Arlington County officials said that a pavement surface had been chosen, and the 30-foot (9.1 m) wide gravel road would be widened to 60 feet (18 m) and paved with asphalt by July 1.

Another major portion of the approaches was finished in July 1932. Although the roads from the Rock Creek and Potomac Parkway, Ohio Drive, and Constitution Avenue were completed in time for the bridge's informal opening in January, the watergate itself was still under construction. This structure was not finished until the middle of July.

=== Final funding battles: 1933 ===
By 1933, most of what remained of the Arlington Memorial Bridge project concerned streets and approaches. Virginia still had not settled on a route for any roads to link to the bridge, and work on Memorial Drive was nearing completion. In the District of Columbia, work remained to be done on Constitution Avenue NW and on 23rd Street NW. The Hemicycle was still incomplete, as were bridges leading from Columbia Island to the Virginia shoreline.

Funding sources for these projects, however, was diversifying. The Arlington Memorial Bridge Commission received some funding, but funding was also now flowing from the Public Works Administration (PWA). Funds no longer came solely from general tax revenue, either. Road work could now be paid for by federal fuel taxes.

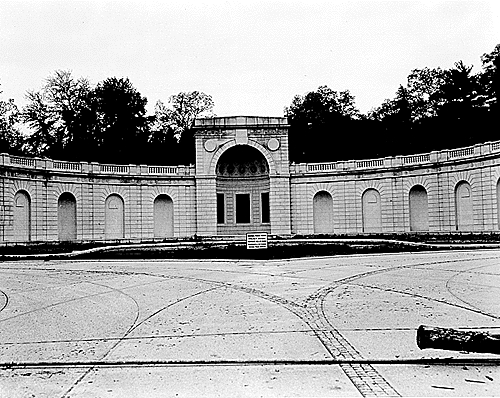
The nearly complete Hemicycle in 1931.

On February 1, an attempt was made in the House of Representatives to delete $282,675 for completing the outstanding projects of the Arlington Memorial Bridge. This effort was easily defeated on the House floor.

In late February, the CFA met to discuss how to proceed with completion of the Hemicycle. But funds for the project were not available.

Franklin D. Roosevelt took office as President of the United States in March 1933. Convinced that massive federal spending on public works was essential not only to "prime the pump" of the economy but also to cut unemployment, Roosevelt proposed passage of the National Industrial Recovery Act. The act contained $6 billion in public works spending, which included $400 million for road, bridge, and highway construction. With passage of the act moving forward swiftly, D.C. officials asked Congress on June 12 for the funds to finish widening Constitution Avenue NW. The act passed on June 13, 1933, and Roosevelt signed it into law on June 16. The Public Works Administration (PWA) was immediately established to disburse the funds appropriated by the act. The District of Columbia received a $1.9 million grant for road and bridge construction, and the city said on July 8 it would use a portion of these funds to finish Constitution Avenue. Construction on the $200,000 project was scheduled to begin at the end of August 1933 and employ 150 men.

The Hemicycle was also completed under the National Industrial Recovery Act. Funding for the structure's completion was included in a $3 million grant made by the PWA in July 1933.

In September 1933, the city received the first disbursement of revenue from the federal gasoline tax. This tax was imposed in the Revenue Act of June 1932. The city used $30,494 in PWA grant money and $45,741 in federal gas tax revenue to widen Constitution Avenue to the full width between North Capitol Street and 2d Street NW. This project began in late September 1933.

=== Completing the final touches: 1934 to 1938 ===
The first public concert was held at the Lincoln Memorial watergate on July 14, 1935. The National Park Service paved the D.C. approaches to Arlington Memorial Bridge that same month.

It was not until September 1936 that the Washington Post reported that federal officials considered the Hemcycle "finished". The structure's fountain was in place, and the Hemicycle was now lit at night. Lighting had also been installed along Memorial Drive, and holly trees and additional oaks had been planted along road.

In 1938, Arlington Memorial Bridge was finally connected to the Arlington County road network. By that year, more than 18,000 vehicles a day used the bridge to access the George Washington Memorial Parkway (formerly the Mount Vernon Memorial Parkway). On October 18, Virginia finally opened its first connection to the bridge, via Lee Boulevard (now Arlington Boulevard) at the north end of Columbia Island.

== Constructing the bascule span ==
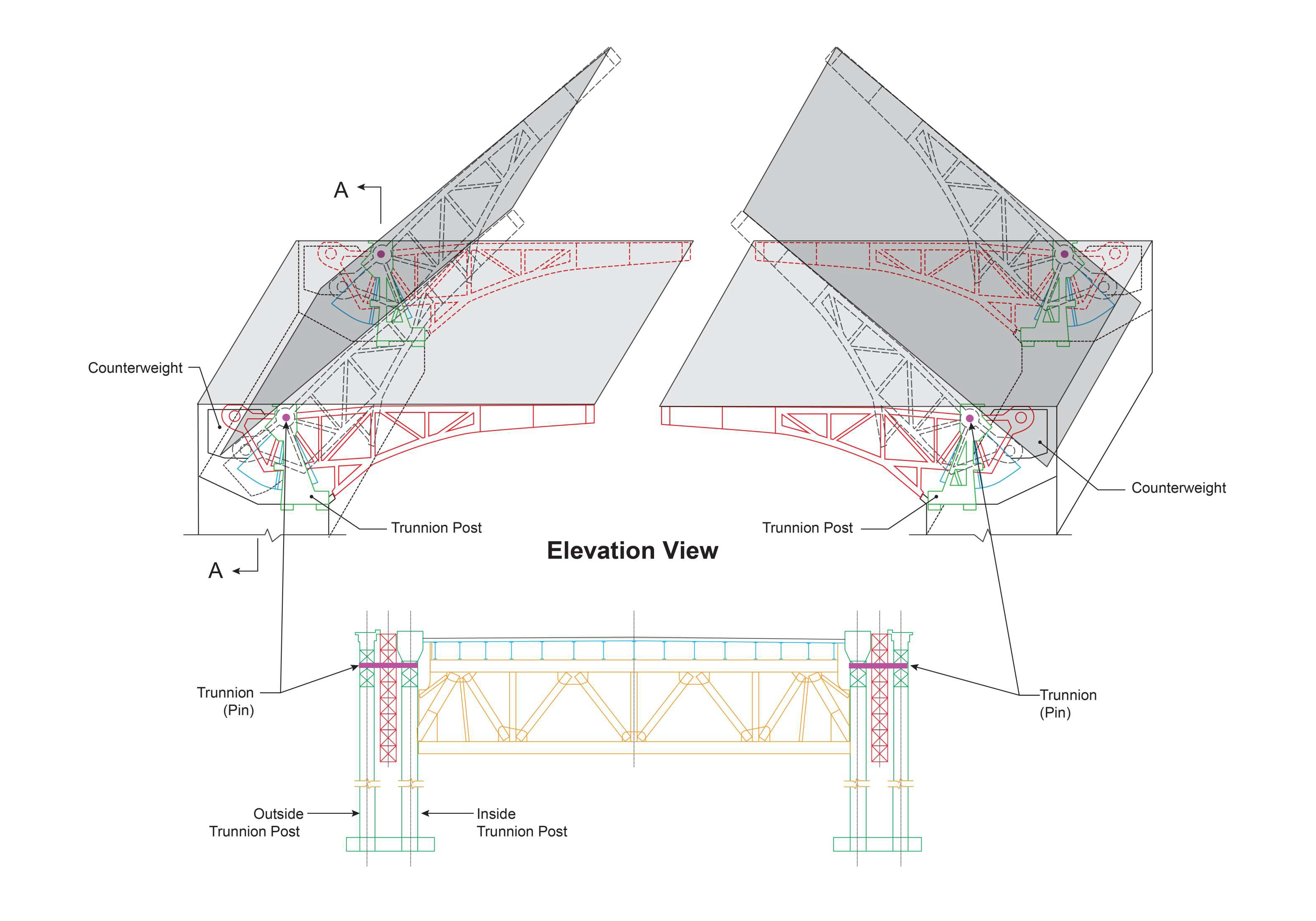
Schematic design of the bascule span of Arlington Memorial Bridge.

Because the 216-foot (66 m) long bascule (or draw) span was so wide, the AMBC and the Army Corps of Engineers decided to hold a competition to determine which type of draw was best suited for the bridge. Six prominent engineering firms were asked to submit designs, which were received on June 14, 1926. Two designs were selected for consideration, and the Corps chose the Strauss bascule bridge (which used a trunnion and counterweight) design submitted by the J. B. Strauss Bascule Bridge Co.

The bascule span was designed to be concealed as much as possible. The AMBC required that the counterweights be hidden within and below the superstructure of the bridge so as not to mar the appearance of the Neoclassical design. The fascia (the band running horizontally along its upper edge) was made of pressed metal that looked like masonry, and it was painted the same color as the rest of the granite on the bridge.

Work began on the engineering and architectural drawings for the bascule span in July 1927.

Bids for construction of the bascule span were opened on July 16, 1928. The Phoenix Bridge Company won the contract to construct the bascule. Work commenced in September 1928 and ended in January 1929. That did not mean the bascule was finished, however. The company encountered problems manufacturing the bascule's components, and production of these elements went forward slowly. By June 30, 1929, only 60 percent of the bascule had been fabricated. Only the trunnion posts for the leaves and the counterweight truss for the east leaf had actually been assembled.

After nearly another year passed, the bascule neared completion. Part of the issue was the bascule span's counterweights. The counterweights needed to have a density of 265 pounds (120 kg) per 1 cubic foot (0.028 m^{3}), or about 5,000 short tons (4,500 t) in total. Usually, large concrete counterweights would be used, but there was so little space inside and beneath the bridge that there was not enough space. Scrap steel punchings and iron ore (from a Swedish cargo ship) were crushed to a mostly uniform size and added to the concrete to create a density of 271 pounds (123 kg) per 1 cubic foot (0.028 m^{3}). The span could open in 60 to 90 seconds.

The east leaf of the bascule went into operation in May 1930. The west leaf was nearly complete by June 30. Pouring of the deck slaps and installation of the operating machinery took place in June 1930 and continued into July.

The bascule span was finally finished in late October 1930. The total cost of the draw span was $1 million. At the time it opened, it was the longest, heaviest (3,000 short tons (2,700 t)), and fastest bascule span in the world.

== 2005 realignment of the D.C. approaches ==
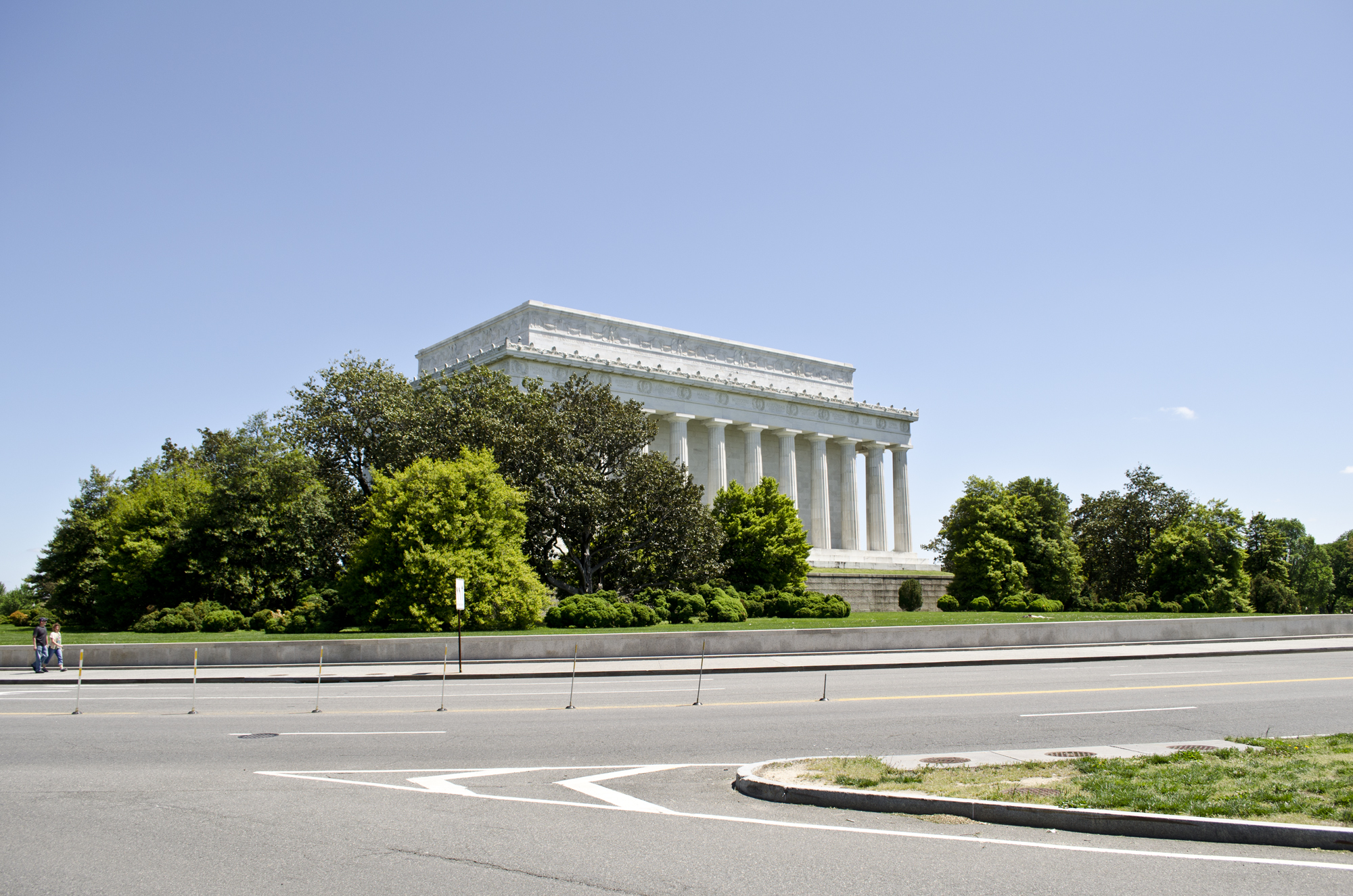
The grassy plaza east of the Lincoln Memorial was raised and a low wall constructed around it as a security measure in 2003.

Little construction occurred on Arlington Memorial Bridge after its informal completion in January 1932. Work continued, however, on the Boundary Channel between Columbia Island and the Virginia mainland, primarily the construction of bridges across the channel, filling in of the Pentagon Lagoon, and similar work. Work on Columbia Island occurred as well, primarily the completion of the road system on the island and some beautification. Widening of the western portions of Constitution Avenue were also completed. By 1938, construction of the Arlington County, Virginia, approaches to Arlington Memorial Bridge was also complete, creating the first link between Virginia's road system and Arlington Memorial Bridge.

In the wake of the September 11 terrorist attacks on New York City and Washington, D.C., there was extensive concern that many monuments and memorials in the District of Columbia were vulnerable to car bombs. Enhancing the security around these memorials began to be considered after Congress enacted legislation requiring all federal monuments and memorial to have a security plan.

To enhance security at the Lincoln Memorial, in 2003 the grassy circle surrounding the memorial was raised slightly and a 30-inch (0.76 m) high masonry retaining wall added to its border on the north, northwest, west, southwest, and south sides.

In April 2004, a $12.2 million, 18-month realignment of the approaches to the Arlington Memorial Bridge and the road system around the Lincoln Memorial began. In part, these changes were driven by traffic patterns. A District of Columbia Department of Transportation and National Park Service study showed that more cars were using the bridge to travel inbound (to D.C. from Virginia) than were using it to travel outbound. As originally constructed, there were five lanes of traffic on the northeastern side of the grassy plaza behind the memorial. Three were outbound, two were inbound. This was changed to two outbound, three inbound. Traffic leaving the approaches to access 23rd Street NW was now forced into the far left lane, while the two right-hand lanes could access Henry Bacon Drive NW (the major connecting street to Constitution Avenue NW). Repaving of all the approaches in the area was scheduled for spring 2005. Safety was also enhanced around the area. Pedestrian crosswalks with traffic lights were added throughout the entire area of the approaches, to slow traffic and make it easier for pedestrians to cross the busy approaches and connecting roads. These construction projects were due for completion in 2006.

== Federal court of claims case ==
Many problems were encountered during the construction of the Arlington Memorial Bridge, but only a single lawsuit was filed.

The Phoenix Bridge Company was awarded the contract to install the bascule span. Numerous delays were incurred during the installation of the span, leading to budgetary overruns. The contract between the bridge company and the AMBC imposed a penalty for delays, and the federal government duly assessed a penalty of $12,300 on the firm. The Phoenix Bridge Company filed suit in the United States Court of Federal Claims, arguing that the penalty was not the fault of the company but due to government-imposed changes in the bridge's construction. The company also asked for the federal government to pay the additional costs. At trial, the Phoenix Bridge Company claimed it could have rented its equipment and labor for $27,433, and that the federal government owed the company this rental income. The Court of Claims agreed, and ordered the government to withdraw the penalty as well.

== Bibliography ==
- Historic American Engineering Record (HAER) No. DC-7, "Arlington Memorial Bridge"
- Arlington Memorial Bridge Commission. The Arlington Memorial Bridge. Washington, D.C.: Government Printing Office, 1924.
- Commission of Fine Arts. Report of the United States Commission of Fine Arts. January 1, 1926 to June 30, 1929. Washington, D.C.: U.S. Government Printing Office, December 5, 1929.
- Fauntroy, Michael K. "Home Rule for the District of Columbia." In Democratic Destiny and the District of Columbia: Federal Politics and Public Policy. Ronald W. Walters and Toni-Michelle Travis, eds. Lanham, Md.: Lexington Books, 2010.
- Goode, James M. The Outdoor Sculpture of Washington, D.C.: A Comprehensive Historical Guide. Washington, D.C.: Smithsonian Institution Press, 1974.
- Gutheim, Frederick A. and Lee, Antoinette J. Worthy of the Nation: Washington, D.C., from L'Enfant to the National Capital Planning Commission. 2d ed. Baltimore, Md.: Johns Hopkins University Press, 2006.
- Helfrich, Kurt G.F.. "'Beloved Ancien': William T. Partridge's Recollections of the Senate Park Commission and the Subsequent Mall Development." In Designing the Nation's Capital: The 1901 Plan for Washington, D.C. Sue Kohler and Pamela Scott, eds. Washington, D.C.: U.S. Commission of Fine Arts, 2006.
- Horne, Robert C. "Bridges Across the Potomac." Records of the Columbia Historical Society. 53/56 (1953/1956): 249–258.
- Koglin, Terry L. Movable Bridge Engineering. Hoboken, N.J.: J. Wiley & Sons, 2003.
- Kohler, Sue A. The Commission of Fine Arts: A Brief History, 1910-1995. Washington, D.C.: U.S. Commission of Fine Arts, 1996.
- Kohler, Sue. "The Commission of Fine Arts: Implementing the Senate Park Commission's Vision." In Designing the Nation's Capital: The 1901 Plan for Washington, D.C. Sue Kohler and Pamela Scott, eds. Washington, D.C.: U.S. Commission of Fine Arts, 2006.
- Moeller, Gerard Martin and Feldblyum, Boris. AIA Guide to the Architecture of Washington, D.C. Baltimore, Md.: Johns Hopkins University Press, 2012.
- Office of Public Buildings and Public Parks of the National Capital. Annual Report of the Director of Public Buildings and Public Parks of the National Capital. Washington, D.C.: Government Printing Office, 1927.
- Office of Public Buildings and Public Parks of the National Capital. Annual Report of the Director of Public Buildings and Public Parks of the National Capital. Washington, D.C.: Government Printing Office, 1928.
- Office of Public Buildings and Public Parks of the National Capital. Annual Report of the Director of Public Buildings and Public Parks of the National Capital. Washington, D.C.: Government Printing Office, 1929.
- Office of Public Buildings and Public Parks of the National Capital. Annual Report of the Director of Public Buildings and Public Parks of the National Capital. Washington, D.C.: Government Printing Office, 1930.
- Sherrill, C.O. First Deficiency Appropriation Bill, 1922. Hearings Before the Subcommittee of the Committee on Appropriations on H.R. 9237. Subcommittee on Appropriations. Committee on Appropriations. U.S. Senate. 67th Cong., 2d sess. Washington, D.C.: Government Printing Office, 1921.
