= Construction of the Virginia approaches to Arlington Memorial Bridge =

Construction project, 1926–1932

Coordinates: 38°53′10″N 77°03′32″W

The construction of the Virginia approaches to Arlington Memorial Bridge was a 16-year road construction project to connect Arlington Memorial Bridge with roads in Arlington County, Virginia, in the United States. Initial design proposals were made in 1926, but extensive political wrangling and indecision delayed the project and even the new bridge itself, which finally opened in 1932 after a connection to the Arlington National Cemetery was made via Memorial Drive.

Officials with Arlington County and the state of Virginia long debated whether to build new roads, which would be far more expensive yet a boon to the local economy, or simply connect existing ones. Federal money became available for building approaches in 1933, four years into the Great Depression. The first connection with the bridge opened in October 1938; a second connection opened in 1942 to link it to the Pentagon road network.

== Early design proposals ==
=== Authorizing the bridge ===
In November 1921, President Warren G. Harding was caught in a three-hour traffic jam while on his way to dedicate the Tomb of the Unknown Soldier at Arlington National Cemetery. Resolving to improve the bridge crossings over the Potomac River, A $25,000 congressional appropriation in 1922 reactivated the long-dormant Arlington Memorial Bridge Commission (AMBC), and provided the political impetus to devise a bridge plan at last. The commission picked the firm of McKim, Mead and White in April 1923 to design a bridge. Architect William Mitchell Kendall was the lead architect for the firm. The bridge design was approved by February 1924, and President Calvin Coolidge signed legislation authorizing the bridge's construction on February 24, 1925.

The legislation authorizing the Arlington Memorial Bridge also provided for the construction of approaches (on-ramps, off-ramps, and pedestrian areas) on both the D.C. and Virginia ends of the bridge; for the improvement of B Street NW as a new ceremonial avenue to link the city with the bridge; the construction of a roadway (eventually called Memorial Drive) between the bridge and the main gate of Arlington National Cemetery; and for a new ceremonial entrance at the cemetery's main gate (subsequently known as the Hemicycle).

Kendall's first design, submitted to the United States Commission of Fine Arts in May 1923, formed the basis for planning the Virginia approaches. Preliminary designs for the bridge showed it terminating on Columbia Island. For the center of Columbia Island, Kendall envisioned a gigantic roadway crossarm circumscribed by a grassy ellipse. The roads north and south from this crossarm would terminate in traffic circles at the northern and southern tips of the island. The traffic circles would accommodate connections to Lee Highway and the proposed Mount Vernon Memorial Parkway.

In addition to the ABMC, the United States Army Corps of Engineers also had approval over engineering aspects of the bridge and over all public works spending in the District of Columbia. The Commission of Fine Arts (CFA) and the National Capital Parks Commission (NCPC) also had authority to approve aspects of the bridge. The CFA by far had the more extensive authority, because it included the right to review the look of the bridge and all of its associated elements (such as the approaches).

When the CFA gave its preliminary approval to the bridge design in 1924, it withheld judgment on the approaches.

=== Designing the Virginia approaches ===
The CFA and NCPC first gave serious consideration to Kendall's preliminary design for the Virginia bridge approaches in January 1926, when they met jointly to discuss how the Virginia Arlington Memorial Bridge terminus would serve as a gateway to Washington, D.C. The two bodies agreed to proceed with a refinement by urban planner C.A.S. Sinclair, who proposed a series of roads radiating outward from the bridge.

Multiple routes were considered by Arlington County and Virginia officials to implement the Sinclair plan. At the time, Lee Boulevard was being built from Seven Corners eastward toward Arlington National Cemetery. Construction officials announced in July 1926 that Lee Boulevard would go south around Arlington National Cemetery, then proceed up the Potomac River shoreline to either connect with Arlington Memorial Bridge near the cemetery's main gate or bridge the Boundary Channel to connect with the roads on Columbia Island. However, in December 1926, the CFA learned that Arlington National Cemetery was likely to expand eastward onto the property of the USDA Experimental Farm (which lay east of Arlington Ridge Road). Because this significantly impacted the radius of road approaches to the bridge as well as the proposed Lee Boulevard route, the CFA asked Kendall to restudy the Columbia Island terminus.

The presence of railroad tracks also caused design problems. The tracks of the Rosslyn Branch of the Pennsylvania Railroad ran somewhat inland along the Virginia shoreline of the Potomac River. In June 1927, the CFA proposed lowering these tracks by 20 feet (6.1 m) to avoid an at-grade crossing with the proposed Memorial Drive. Since this trench also affected the Virginia road connections to the bridge, studies as to how to best design the approaches were ordered in spring 1927. Deciding which roads to extend through the area and where to build them proved increasingly vexatious. In July 1927, the NCPC said it would study the entire area between Arlington Memorial Bridge and Francis Scott Key Bridge to determine how best to coordinate the Virginia approaches with existing roadways. The NCPC said, however, that it expected Columbia Island's north crossarm to connect with Lee Highway. Lee Highway (not to be confused with Lee Boulevard.) was then under construction in a west-northwesterly direction from Falls Church, Virginia. At the time, its exact eastern terminus had not yet been decided, although many expected it to link with Francis Scott Key Bridge. The Virginia State Highway Commission, which was providing some of the money for Lee Highway, agreed with the NCPC. But Arlington County, which was building the highway, remained silent on the issue.

Arlington County and Virginia officials were quiet about their preferences for the approaches in 1926 and 1927. The NCPC had the authority in the D.C. metropolitan area not only to approve or disapprove any major construction project on or within view of federal property but also to approve road construction in the region which used federal funds. The agency had long stated its intention to support the urbanization of Arlington County (in part to provide for more and better housing for the federal workforce, and to improve the capital's economy). The Virginia State Highway Commission was considering a number of routes, some of which skirted rather than passed through Arlington County. However, the NCPC and the CFA both said in July 1927 that they would approve any route chosen by the state, so long as it did not skirt the county. Only by building the road through Arlington County could the NCPC's goal of increased urbanization be met, they said, and both agencies urged the state and the county to make their choice quickly.

The CFA continued to study how Virginia should best connect to Arlington Memorial Bridge in 1929, and another set of preliminary plans were submitted by William Kendall in July 1930. Few of the problems facing the various plans were solved by November 1930, and the state and county still declined to choose an approach route.

== Disputes over approaches prior to the Arlington Memorial Bridge dedication ==
By early 1931, Arlington Memorial Bridge was nearing completion, but citizens of Arlington County had no way of using the bridge as no approaches had been approved by the state or county in the preceding five years. Arlington County itself took no action on any bridge approaches until January 1931, when it began tentatively surveying potential routes. In February 1931, citizens of Clarendon, Ft. Myer Heights, and Lyon Village — unincorporated communities north and northwest of Arlington National Cemetery — met with the Arlington County Board of Supervisors and a Commonwealth's Attorney from the state of Virginia to identify a route north of the cemetery. A month later, after consulting with the NCPC, the County Board of Supervisors said it favored a plan to build a temporary road south of the cemetery to connect with the planned route for Lee Boulevard. But in April 1931, a committee of civic groups asked the County Board of Supervisors to push for a third proposed route: Extending Washington Boulevard south around Arlington National Cemetery to connect with the bridge. At the time, Washington Boulevard (also known as "Washington Street") was under construction from East Falls Church westward toward the northwest corner of Arlington National Cemetery. Once it reached the Clarendon neighborhood, it was to proceed southeast to connect to Lee Boulevard. The civic groups had learned that state highway planners were tentatively discussing a way to extend Washington Boulevard south around the cemetery to connect with U.S. Route 1. The civic groups wanted Washington Boulevard extended north to Columbia Island. This was similar to the proposed Lee Boulevard route which was threatened by the eastward expansion of the cemetery. The same month, the Washington Post reported (without identifying sources) that the approach to the bridge would come from Lee Boulevard.

Confusion over the route occurred through the summer of 1931. In July, the Arlington County Board of Supervisors said it had not approved a Washington Boulevard approach to Arlington Memorial Bridge, but then a month later a county supervisor said that trenching and grading for a Washington Boulevard approach was under way. In September, the Washington Post reported that only 0.33 miles (0.53 km) of roadway was needed to connect the bridge to Lee Highway.

In fact, no decision on an approach (much less multiple approaches) had been made. Federal officials said on September 7, 1931, that there were no Arlington County approaches, and as far as they could ascertain none would be open in 1932, either. A road from the bridge south down Columbia Island and a bridge over the Boundary Channel to connect with the Mount Vernon Memorial Parkway would open in late 1931 or early 1932, they said. But that was the only work foreseen.

Construction on Washington Boulevard was under way, even though it had not been formally approved as a bridge approach. The county reported in October 1931 that it had obtained the final right-of-way to construct Washington Boulevard to Arlington Memorial Bridge, and grading for the street was to occur in early 1932.

Complicating matters, in late November 1931 the state of Virginia asked the federal government to build 2 miles (3.2 km) of road connecting Memorial Bridge with Lee Boulevard (which was reaching Fort Myer).

In January 1932, President Herbert Hoover informally dedicated Arlington Memorial Bridge. At the time, the only connection from the bridge to Virginia was via the George Washington Memorial Parkway's Boundary Channel Bridge (later referred to as the "Humpback Bridge"). Although the road across Columbia Island was not complete and neither the road nor bridge had lights, the route was possible. Hoover and his party drove over the bridge, across Columbia Island, over the Boundary Channel Bridge, and down the Parkway, still referred to as the Mount Vernon Highway by some at the time, to the entrance to Mount Vernon.

== Disputes over approaches after the Arlington Memorial Bridge dedication ==
In January 1932, a fourth approach to the bridge was suggested: Oil Plant Road. This street (whose upper portion is now known as North Arlington Ridge Road, and whose lower portion is now part of Wilson Boulevard) began near Key Bridge and ended at the northern edge of Arlington National Cemetery — very close to the northern tip of Columbia Island. Local citizens suggested either linking Oil Plant Road to Memorial Avenue or building a bridge that would allow the street to cross Boundary Channel and access Arlington Memorial Bridge. Arlington County Manager Roy S. Braden finally said on February 1 that he would make a decision on which approach to recommend by the end of April 1932. One federal official tried to force the issue. Representative Clifton A. Woodrum attempted to earmark funds for a bridge aligned with the proposed Lee Highway approach. But these funds were deleted on the floor of the United States House of Representatives.

The dedication of the link between the Arlington Memorial Bridge and Arlington Cemetery occurred on April 9, 1932, and this created a second connection from Virginia to Columbia Island and the Bridge. Colonel Ulysses S. Grant III, executive director of the Arlington Memorial Bridge Commission and an officer in the U.S. Army Corps of Engineers, formally opened Memorial Avenue and the Boundary Channel Bridge. (Memorial Avenue was only 30 feet (9.1 m) wide and unpaved, but the Corps was working to have it widened to 60 feet (18 m) and pave it by July 1.) But that work wasn't completed until February 1933.

In March 1933, ahead of schedule, the Arlington County Board of Commissioners voted to pursue the Lee Boulevard route for a connection to Arlington Memorial Bridge.

The action by the County Board of Commissioners did not end the dispute over which approach to the bridge was the best. Disputes continued for the remainder of the decade, and a fourth approach along Wilson Boulevard suggested as well.

=== The Lee Highway route ===
The Lee Highway route was under active consideration through 1933, but abandoned in favor of Lee Boulevard.

Arlington County Board of Supervisors chairman Harry A. Fellows formally ordered County Manager Roy S. Braden to begin acquiring rights-of-way on February 28, 1933. The National Industrial Recovery Act, signed into law on June 16, 1933, by President Franklin D. Roosevelt, appropriated $200,000 for construction on any approach to the bridge.

Despite these actions, the Lee Highway route had not yet been approved by any governing body. The Commission of Fine Arts considered the Lee Highway route on July 15, 1933, but did not approve it. A bill was introduced into the Virginia General Assembly authorizing construction of the Lee Highway approach in August 1933. but the bill did not pass. By November 1933, the Works Progress Administration was ready to pay the state and county to employ out-of-work, unskilled laborers on construction projects. To take advantage of the offer, Arlington County officials began work to fix the route for the approach to Arlington Memorial Bridge. A joint CFA/NCPC group studied the Lee Highway and other approaches to the bridge on November 15, and on December 4 the CFA said it would approve any approach that Virginia and Arlington County did. The joint group study would ultimately be used to recommend both a northern and southern connection onto Columbia Island Despite such broad committee support, the Lee Highway connection was never again actively considered by Arlington County or the state of Virginia.

=== The Washington Boulevard route ===
Work on the Washington Boulevard approach actually began in 1931. Angry citizens pushed the county to begin construction, but it ended after the county election in November 1931 left supervisors safe in office for another two years. Arlington County engineers quickly called the Washington Boulevard route south of the cemetery inappropriate.

The Washington Boulevard route received a significant boost when, on January 27, 1933, Arlington County, the NCPC, and the United States Department of War reached an agreement on rights-of-way along the route. The agreement gave the county a 100-foot (30 m) right-of-way across Fort Myer and the southwestern tip of Arlington National Cemetery and another 60-foot (18 m) right-of-way from the cemetery to Mount Vernon Memorial Parkway across War Department land. The agreement absolved the War Department from expending any funds on the road construction project, and committed the NCPC to seek a $35,000 appropriation to construct the road from the cemetery to the parkway.

The National Industrial Recovery Act, signed into law on June 16, 1933, by President Franklin D. Roosevelt, appropriated $200,000 for construction on any approach to the bridge. These funds could be used for any approach, including the Washington Boulevard extension.

The CFA reaffirmed it would approve any approach to Arlington Memorial Bridge, whether it went north or south around Arlington National Cemetery. But no construction began. By November 1933, the Works Progress Administration WPA was ready to pay the state and county to employ out-of-work, unskilled laborers on construction projects. To take advantage of the offer, Arlington County officials began work to fix the route for the approach to Arlington Memorial Bridge.

For the first time since 1931, construction on the approach occurred in 1934. WPA money was used to hire laborers to begin the extension of the roadway past Lee Boulevard toward the cemetery. Construction created a number of traffic hazards. By April 1935, the road had reached Fort Myer and Arlington National Cemetery. Survey work showed that a lower grade could be achieved by altering the route, but this would require an addition expenditure of $21,966 for rights-of-way.

But no additional expenditure was made by the county, and work ceased on the Washington Boulevard extension.

=== The Wilson Boulevard route ===
The Oil Plant Road extension was never seriously considered after it was proposed, but a Wilson Boulevard approach was. Wilson Boulevard was one of Arlington County's oldest roads, and one of the first to be paved. It ran roughly northwest from Seven Corners to Rosslyn. Between North Glebe Road and Washington Boulevard, it was paralleled by North Fairfax Drive. From Washington Boulevard to Rosslyn, it was paralleled by Clarendon Boulevard.

In June 1932, six months after the dedication of Arlington Memorial Bridge, the Rosslyn Civic League (a group of local citizens) demanded that the Arlington County Board of Supervisors extend Wilson Boulevard to the bridge. At first, the board of supervisors said that it actually favored the Wilson Boulevard route over all others. They reiterated this support in September 1932. But not action was taken to being construction.

In March 1933, ahead of schedule, the Arlington County Board of Commissioners voted to pursue the Lee Boulevard route for a connection to Arlington Memorial Bridge. This did not rule out the Wilson Boulevard route, although the county by now favored Lee Boulevard because it would boost economic development in the area. The county's wishes seemed to be pushed aside, however, in May 1933. Colonel Ulysses S. Grant III asked the Federal Employment Stabilization Board to fund $12 million in construction projects in Virginia that included extending Wilson Boulevard to Arlington Memorial Bridge. Grant's proposal was not approved.

The Wilson Boulevard extension ran into trouble with rights-of-way. On November 25, the county learned it had failed to obtain title to a small strip of land needed for the bridge approach. This meant that the Wilson Boulevard approach could not be submitted to the state of Virginia to obtain funding from the Civil Works Administration. Without federal funding, the project appeared dead. The federal government pledged in December 1933 that WPA money would be available in the future to hire laborers to begin the extension of the roadway. By June 1934, no funds had come forth as there was still no consensus on which road and route was being extended.

The Arlington County Civic Federation urged the County Board of Supervisors in July 1934 to appropriate funds for the extension of Wilson Boulevard to Arlington Memorial Bridge. CWA funds for the approach appeared to have been secured in late June. But the Federal Emergency Relief Administration took over the CWA, and the funds were never released. With the project stalled, the Arlington County Board of Supervisors agreed to extend Wilson Boulevard on June 30, 1934. But they didn't agree to create an approach to Arlington Memorial Bridge. By late September 1934, construction on the Wilson Boulevard extension was well under way, but not additional pushes were made to create an approach to Columbia Island and the bridge.

== The Lee Boulevard route ==
The Lee Boulevard route faced numerous problems during its construction. The eastward expansion of Arlington National Cemetery led state and county officials to plot a route around the north rather than south end of Arlington National Cemetery.

=== Rights-of-way problems ===
In May 1932, Arlington county officials learned that the Virginia State Highway Commission had not obtained all the rights-of-way needed for the northern route. On May 22, the County Board of Supervisors ordered the Commonwealth's Attorney to seek condemnation of an 80-foot (24 m) right-of-way from Washington Boulevard north to North Pershing Drive. To assist the state in building this route, Senator Carter Glass attempted to secure a $10,000 appropriation to help the state survey the Lee Boulevard route. His effort was not successful.

By 1933, Lee Boulevard had reached 10th Street North. Geography, however, required it to cut through the tip of the northwest corner of Ft. Myer. In February 1933, Congress enacted legislation allowing the War Department to transfer a 60-foot (18 m) wide right-of-way to the state for construction of the road. A week later, the county began meeting with property owners to begin securing additional rights-of-way on the planned route. Citizen groups supporting alternative routes began pressing the state to stop cooperating with the county on construction of the Lee Boulevard. But the State Highway Commission determined that it could not abandon the county's choice without state legislation. Opponents of the Lee Boulevard route took hope as construction came to a stop in Lyon Park over a lack of rights-of-way. Stymied by the inability to obtain the rights-of-way, supporters of the Lee Boulevard route met in mid-March 1933 to strategize, but it was clear by the end of April that the connection could not be made by the end of 1933. Progress was made, however, when the state received $200,000 from the Public Works Administration to purchase rights-of-way and continue work on the road.

=== Route studies ===
Additional impetus for the Lee Boulevard approach came on July 8, 1933, when CFA said it would approve Virginia approaches to Arlington Memorial Bridge around either the north or south side of Arlington Cemetery. The CFA discussed how the approaches would function at a meeting on July 15. but proposed a major revision to the Lee Boulevard plan. It suggested on July 28 that the street shift far to the north to avoid a steep hill (now the southern portion of the Radnor/Fort Myer Heights neighborhood). A local civic group, the Lee Boulevard Association, gave its backing to the new route and secured the donation of some land for the purpose. Arlington County began budgeting for the construction of Lee Boulevard in November 1933.

With no approach route actually having been chosen by both the state of Virginia and county of Arlington, study of all proposed routes continued. A joint CFA/NCPC study of the proposed approaches occurred on November 16, 1933. Three weeks later, the CFA recommended that bridges be built on both the north and south ends of Columbia Island, linking it with the mainland. The north bridge should link to Lee Boulevard, the commission said, and the south bridge should link to an approach from the south.

=== Additional rights-of-way negotiations ===
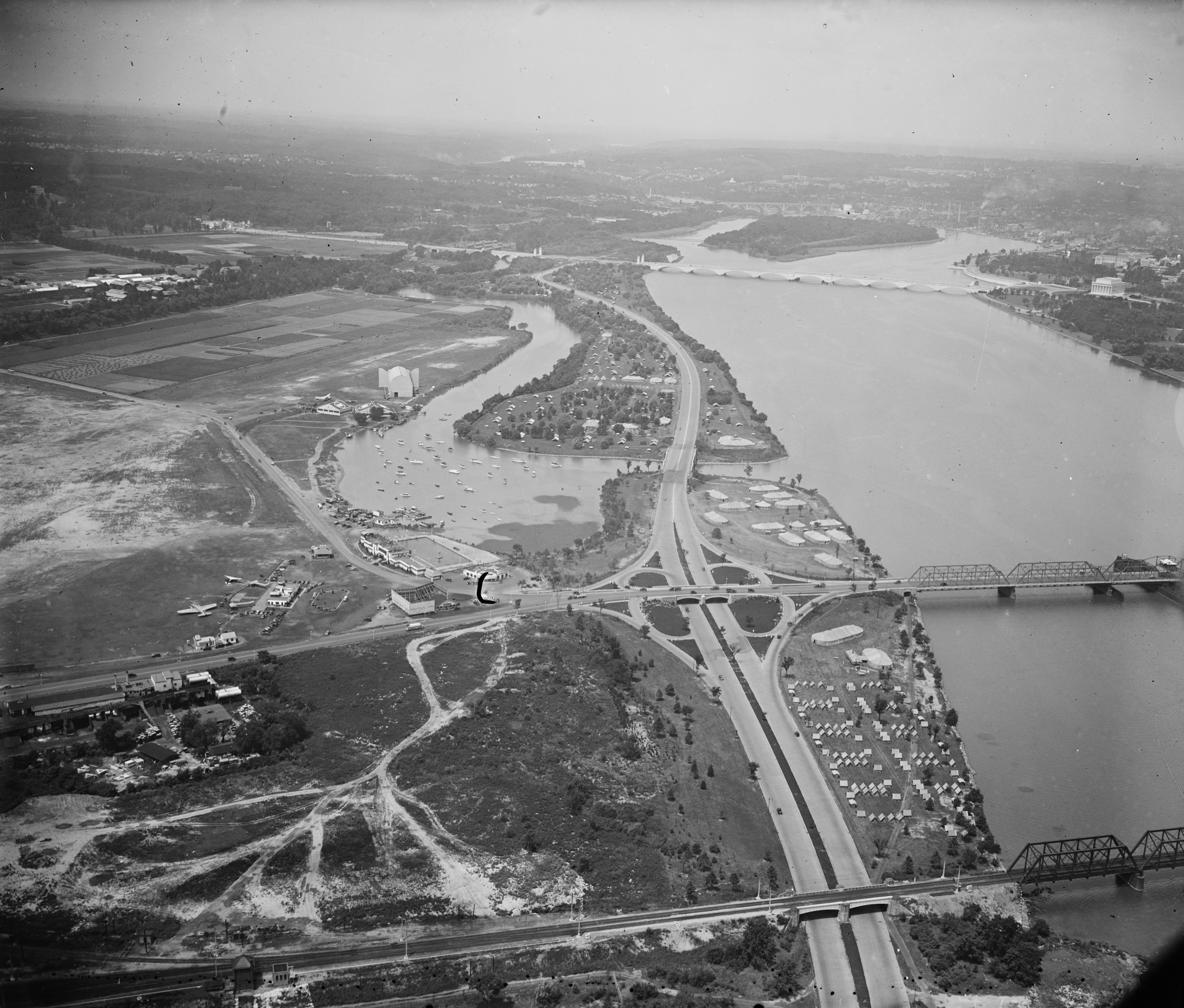
Columbia Island and bridge approaches in 1935

By August 1934, the Virginia State Highway Commission was still working on obtaining rights-of-way for the Lee Boulevard route. The state believed it was close to completing this process, however, and construction on the roadway would begin soon. Minor delays were encountered in October 1934 while the state resurveyed a small portion of the route in order to avoid condemnation of a large and expensive home, but state highway officials said they were likely to issue bids for construction by the end of November.

This assessment proved optimistic. By February 1935, it was clear that the rights-of-way obtained by Arlington County were not those which the state highway commission wanted to have. Negotiations began between the state and county over the route. Once more, optimism was expressed that the negotiations would come to a quick resolution.

The right-of-way negotiations continued into mid-1935. By June, state officials were looking into a Lee Boulevard extension along the former southern route. State highway officials conferred with county engineers the same month about both routes, and the state began surveying the southern route in July. The state even appropriated $150,000 to begin construction and finished its survey work in August.

=== Virginia agrees to construction ===
On August 8, the state of Virginia abandoned its plans and agreed to begin work on the northern route for Lee Boulevard. For nearly a year, state and county officials had disagreed whether the northern route rights-of-way were adequate to begin construction. The state disagreed, but Arlington County officials did not wish to spend more money in the depths of the Great Depression to acquire more rights-of-way. By actively reconsidering the southern route, however, the state of Virginia put pressure on Arlington County to fix the rights-of-way problems with the northern route. Agreement to begin construction on the northern route finally was reached on August 8. The state of Virginia agreed to provide $83,450 to purchase the remaining required rights-of-way. Arlington County provided another $21,122.

In January 1936, after a delay of almost 18 months, Arlington County officials said construction would begin in a few months. Much of the construction was funded by the U.S. federal government. But at the last minute, federal funds were withheld because the county had not completed rezoning of the area. The county passed an emergency resolution rezoning the area on April 7.

=== Ft. Myer easement and commencement of construction ===
With the zoning resolved, a new problem with easements on federal land had arisen that further prevented the federal government from disbursing funds. The best geographic route for Lee Boulevard crossed the northwestern tip of Fort Myer. The War Department was willing to grant an easement to the state to construct this road, but insisted on maintaining jurisdiction over the property. That was unacceptable to the state of Virginia. Other federal officials said that the federal government would also continue to reserve the right to build other approaches to Arlington Memorial Bridge, which the state of Virginia also opposed.

The state of Virginia then proposed that federal legislation be enacted to transfer the land to the state. The commandant of Fort Myer, Colonel Jonathan M. Wainwright, said on July 30, 1936, that he would not opposed such legislation. This legislation was introduced in the 75th United States Congress in January 1937.

== Making the connection with Lee Boulevard ==
In November 1935, work began on another bridge from Columbia Island to the Virginia mainland. This bridge was financed with $25,000 from Arlington County, $25,000 from the state of Virginia, and $350,000 from the Public Works Administration. The bridge was the third connection to the Virginia mainland (after the Humpback Bridge taking the George Washington Memorial Parkway south and the Boundary Channel Bridge leading to Memorial Drive). But it was designed only to carry the George Washington Memorial Parkway (formerly the Mount Vernon Memorial Parkway) north across Boundary Channel. The parkway would then continue north to Key Bridge. The CFA gave its approval for the design of this bridge in October 1936. Construction of a temporary bridge in this location was approved in April 1937. it was built by the firm of Joseph A. LeVezza & Sons of Baltimore, Maryland, for $24,875.

The United States Senate approved the Ft. Myer title transfer legislation on March 24, and the House of Representatives followed suit in May. President Franklin D. Roosevelt signed the legislation into law on May 25, 1937. As approval of the land transfer legislation was pending, Virginia let bids for construction of the final two miles of Lee Boulevard, and opened the bids on April 20.

As construction moved forward, local Arlington County residents demanded that Lee Boulevard between Fort Myer and the Potomac River be zoned only for residential use (not apartment buildings or commercial/industrial use). To keep construction on track, the NCPC agreed to assist the county with these zoning issues.

Construction proceeded swiftly. By mid-July, 1937, the bridge intended to connect Lee Boulevard with Columbia Island was under way, and studies for bridging the Rosslyn Branch of the Pennsylvania Railroad were to begin soon. Two months later, on September 18, the NCPC approved construction of a road from the Great Plaza on Columbia Island northwest to the Lee Boulevard bridge. Construction on the overpass across the railroad tracks began by September 24, and Arlington County opened bids on grading the final leg of Lee Boulevard were opened September 25. The NCPC and CFA approved connection of the Columbia Island bridge to Lee Boulevard on December 16.

Construction on Lee Boulevard and the bridge to Columbia Island was due for completion on September 1, 1938. A major ceremony was planned, with President Roosevelt, Secretary of the Interior Harold L. Ickes, Governor of Virginia James Hubert Price, and officials of the CFA, National Park Service, and NCPC in attendance. The ceremony never happened. Major unspecified delays occurred which prevented the approach from opening on schedule. On September 21, a new completion date of October 15 was set. By now, the Lee Boulevard approach was part of a broader, $1 million project to link Columbia Island with Lee Boulevard and beautify the entire Virginia waterfront. The main problem was the Boundary Channel bridge, as the railroad overpass and Columbia Island roadways were finished.

But even the October 15 opening was missed. As completion neared, yet another deadline of the morning of October 19 was set. But minor legal matters held up even this deadline, and the bridge did not open until the morning of October 20. The total cost of the Columbia Island roadway, bridges over Boundary Channel and the railroad tracks, and the off-ramps from Lee Boulevard to the bridge was $200,000. And it wasn't until June 1941 that the two bridges and the Columbia Island roadway were finally illuminated.

== Later connections ==
In 1938, Congress approved $100,000 to connect Arlington Memorial Bridge with the plaza in Rosslyn. The route was temporary, meant to become a side-road once the George Washington Memorial Parkway was extended to Key Bridge.

Mobilization for World War II, which began in the United States in 1940, led to the establishment of a southern approach route to the bridge. The War Department, which controlled Arlington National Cemetery, announced that it would use the land east of the cemetery for rapid expansion of military training facilities and new office space. To accommodate traffic to this area, Secretary of War Harry Hines Woodring agreed in May 1940 to give the state of Virginia a 200-foot (61 m) wide easement for a new, wide road extending from the cemetery's south boundary northwest to Columbia Island. In October 1940, Congress passed legislation authorizing the War Department to purchase Washington-Hoover Airport This legislation, however, provided formal approval of the roadway easement for construction of a second Arlington Memorial Bridge approach. An unnamed sourced suggested in February 1941 that a portion of Boundary Channel near the under-construction Pentagon be filled in so that the new road did not have to use a bridge to connect to the George Washington Memorial Parkway and Arlington Memorial Bridge. The CFA asked military engineers to study this proposal.

A new, unnamed bridge was, in fact, built. In March 1941, the NCPC approved a $300,000 extension of Washington Boulevard as a four-lane divided highway to connect with Arlington Memorial Bridge. The boulevard would have several on-ramps near its intersection with Columbia Pike, permitting large numbers of defense workers to access the Navy Annex Building (then already under construction at South Oak Street and South Southgate Road).

In October 1941, the NCPC approved a much wider Pentagon road network plan for the entire area south of Arlington National Cemetery and around the Pentagon. Three new roads were now planned for the area: Columbia Pike, an extension of U.S. Route 1 in Virginia from Alexandria to Washington Boulevard, and Army-Navy Boulevard (now known as Army-Navy Drive). (Virginia State Route 110 extended U.S. Route 1 past Washington Boulevard to Memorial Drive, where a new off-ramp made a connection to the Boundary Channel Bridge and Arlington Memorial Bridge as well.) The so-called "Army-Navy Boulevard Bridge" carrying Washington Boulevard over the Boundary Channel was under construction in January 1942. It was completed sometime in late 1942 and renamed "Washington Boulevard".

=== Repairs ===
In April 1941, the so-called "Humpback Bridge" on the south end of Columbia Island underwent repair. This bridge (with no official name but nicknamed the "humpback" because of a rise in the middle of the span) was built on landfill dredged from the Potomac River. As this earth settled, the bridge's steel and masonry footings were endangered. Steel girders were driven into the earth and placed against the abutments and piers to stabilize the bridge.

By December 1941, the wooden bridge built by Arlington County to carry Lee Boulevard over the Boundary Channel was in serious disrepair. It was so decrepit that engineers feared it might collapse, so the NCPC limited traffic over the bridge to just 8 miles per hour (13 km/h). Because steel, timber, and other building materials as well as construction personnel were being diverted to war needs, federal officials believed it would be 12 to 18 months before the bridge could be rebuilt. In fact, the bridge was not replaced until 1949. Steel for the new Lee Boulevard connecting bridge was obtained only in December 1948. Reconstruction of the bridge occurred in spring 1949. One lane of the bridge opened on September 19, 1949, and the other lane later that week.

In 1951, the name of Lee Boulevard was changed to Arlington Boulevard to end confusion with Lee Highway.

== Bibliography ==
- Arlington Memorial Bridge Commission. The Arlington Memorial Bridge. Washington, D.C.: Government Printing Office, 1924.
- Division of Central Accounts. Digest of Appropriations for the Support of the Government of the United States. U.S. Department of the Treasury. Washington, D.C.: U.S. Government Printing Office, 1938.
- Kohler, Sue A. The Commission of Fine Arts: A Brief History, 1910-1995. Washington, D.C.: United States Commission of Fine Arts, 1996.
- Office of Public Buildings and Public Parks of the National Capital. Annual Report of the Director of Public Buildings and Public Parks of the National Capital. Washington, D.C.: Government Printing Office, 1927.
- Peters, James Edward. Arlington National Cemetery, Shrine to America's Heroes. Bethesda, Md.: Woodbine House, 2000.
