= Arthur A. Kimball =

Arthur Kimball

Personal details
- Born: Arthur Alden Kimball; 1908; Washington, D.C., U.S.
- Died: 1996 (aged 88); Melbourne, Florida, U.S.
- Relations: Ivory Kimball (grandfather)
- Education: George Washington University (LLB)

Arthur Alden Kimball (1908 – 1996) was an American civil servant and lawyer who was part of the prosecution staff for the Nuremberg Trials, and also helped establish the Economic Cooperation Administration for administering the Marshall Plan.

== Early life and education ==
Kimball was born in Washington, D.C. His father, Arthur H. Kimball, was a prominent ophthalmologist and his grandfather, Judge Ivory Kimball, was a Civil War veteran who was appointed judge of the Washington, D.C. Police Court by President Grover Cleveland in 1893. He earned a Bachelor of Laws from George Washington University Law School.

== Career ==
Arthur Kimball entered government service in 1928 when he began work as a clerk for the United States Census Bureau. Over the next several years he worked for the National Recovery Administration and the Social Security Board. At the start of World War II he joined the United States Army and became a budget officer in the United States Department of War. He later served as chief of administration for the U.S. prosecution team at the Nazi war crimes trials in Nuremberg, Germany.

After the war Kimball worked in the United States Department of State and helped General George C. Marshall establish the Economic Cooperation Administration to implement the Marshall Plan. Kimball later served as head of the International Information Administration, a branch of the State Department. When the IIA became a separate agency, the United States Information Agency, in 1953, President Dwight D. Eisenhower allowed Kimball to serve as acting director until the first full-time director, Theodore Streibert, could take office.

Kimball then joined the White House Office as staff director of the president’s Advisory Committee on Government Organization (PACGO). He assisted the committee chairmen, Nelson Rockefeller and Arthur Flemming, and managed the work of the committee’s professional staff. In November 1960 President Eisenhower appointed Kimball to the National Labor Relations Board. The Senate did not confirm the appointment and Kimball left government service after John F. Kennedy became president. He practiced law in Washington, D.C. for five years, and then returned to government service in 1966. He worked for the Social Security Administration and the Department of Health, Education and Welfare. From 1972 to 1974, he was director of international training at the Agency for International Development. In December 1974 he retired and moved to Florida where he became alumni officer at the Florida Institute of Technology.

== Death ==
Kimball died at the age of 88 in Melbourne, Florida.
