= 55th Indiana Infantry Regiment =

55th Regiment Indiana Infantry
- Active: June 16, 1862 – October 23, 1862
- Country: United States
- Allegiance: Union
- Branch: Infantry
- Engagements: Battle of Richmond

The 55th Regiment Indiana Infantry was an infantry regiment that served in the Union Army during the American Civil War.

== Service ==
The 55th Indiana Infantry was organized at Indianapolis, Indiana and mustered in for three months' service on June 16, 1862.

The regiment was attached to Manson's Brigade, Army of Kentucky, District of Central Kentucky.

The 55th Indiana Infantry mustered out beginning September 6, 1862 through October 23, 1862.

== Detailed service ==
Duty at Camp Morton, Indiana, guarding prisoners until August. Operations against Morgan July 4-28. Ordered to Kentucky, August. Battle of Richmond, Kentucky, August 30. Mostly captured. Paroled and sent to Indianapolis, Indiana.

== Casualties ==
The regiment lost a total of 13 men during service; 1 officer and 9 enlisted men killed or mortally wounded, and 3 enlisted men died of disease.

== Commanders ==
- Lieutenant Colonel John R. Mahan - commanded at the battle of Richmond

== Notable members ==
- Private Ivory Kimball, Company E - primary advocate for the Arlington Memorial Amphitheater at Arlington National Cemetery

== See also ==
- List of Indiana Civil War regiments
- Indiana in the Civil War
