= Project Pedro =

Project Pedro was a secretly funded program under the United States Information Agency during the 1950s to create newsreels in Mexico. The program was a clandestine public relations campaign to spread propaganda portraying the United States positively and Communism negatively, in an effort to change the Mexican public's attitude toward Communism as part of the Cold War. Projects with similar objectives were carried out in other Latin American countries, such as Brazil, Chile, Bolivia and Ecuador.

The project was publicly operated in part by a former film executive named Richard K. Tompkins who had produced anti-communist animated cartoons and films in Mexico. Tompkins allowed the USIA to influence newsreel content while having no official trace to production. Since Mexican citizens owned the rest of the production company creating the newsreels, the USIA was not required to publicly disclose its involvement in the project.

Project Pedro began production in February 1957 and by the end of that year, its newsreels were shown in several hundred movie theaters throughout Mexico. Several major corporations sponsored the project, including the manufacturers of Corona and Coca-Cola. Due to concerns about Project Pedro's high cost and efficacy, the USIA terminated funding for the program in September 1961.
