= Economic Cooperation Administration =

Former United States government agency

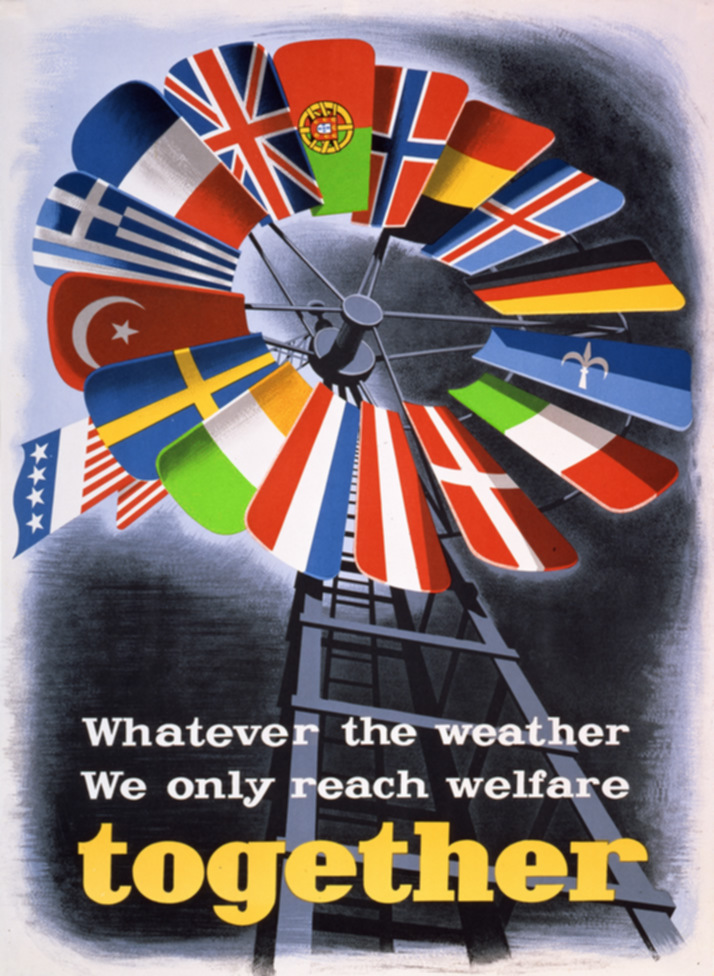
One of a number of posters created by the Economic Cooperation Administration to promote the Marshall Plan in Europe. The flags, as depicted clockwise from the top, are those of Portugal, Norway, Belgium, Iceland, West Germany, the Free Territory of Trieste (erroneously with a blue background instead of red), Italy, Denmark, Austria, the Netherlands, Ireland, Sweden, Turkey, Greece, France, and the United Kingdom.

The Economic Cooperation Administration (ECA) was a U.S. government agency set up in 1948 to administer the Marshall Plan. It reported to both the State Department and the Department of Commerce. The agency's first head was Paul G. Hoffman, a former leader of car manufacturer Studebaker; he was succeeded by William Chapman Foster in 1950. Truman initially wanted to nominate Dean Acheson, but Hoffman was a more acceptable candidate to Congress, which preferred someone with more business acumen. The rest of the organization was also headed by major business figures such as Arthur A. Kimball (who was a key contributor to the ECA's founding) as well as David K.E. Bruce (who worked at the Office of Strategic Services in Europe during World War II).

The ECA had an office in the capital of each of the 16 countries participating in the Marshall Plan. In theory the ECA served as joint administrator of the Marshall Plan development projects in each European country. In practice, local officials knew far more about what was needed than ECA representatives, who developed a management strategy of listening to local officials and allowed them to set priorities for reconstruction assistance.

It was succeeded by the Mutual Security Agency in 1951, one of the predecessors to the United States Agency for International Development.

== Administrators ==
Name	Start	End	President
Paul Hoffman	April 9, 1948	September 30, 1950	Harry S. Truman (1945–1953)
William Foster	October 2, 1950	September 12, 1951	Harry S. Truman (1945–1953)
