= United States Information Agency =

Former government agency

- Seal of the U.S. Information Agency

- Logo of the U.S. Information Agency

Agency overview
- Formed: August 1953
- Dissolved: October 1, 1999
- Superseding agency: State Department, Public Diplomacy and Public Affairs U.S. Agency for Global Media
- Jurisdiction: Federal government of the United States
- Headquarters: Washington, D.C.

The United States Information Agency (USIA) was a United States government agency devoted to propaganda which operated from 1953 to 1999. The agency's primary mission was to promote a favorable view of the United States abroad, focusing exclusively on international audiences until 1990. USIA sponsored various educational and cultural programs, such as cultural exchanges and international broadcasting, aiming to influence foreign perceptions of American democracy and market principles.

Previously existing United States Information Service (USIS) posts operating out of U.S. embassies worldwide since World War II became the field operations offices of the USIA. In 1978, USIA was merged with the Bureau of Educational and Cultural Affairs of the Department of State into a new agency called the United States International Communications Agency (USICA). Use of the name United States Information Agency (USIA) was restored in 1982.

In 1999, prior to the reorganization of intelligence agencies by President George W. Bush, President Bill Clinton assigned USIA's cultural exchange and non-broadcasting intelligence functions to the newly created under secretary of state for public diplomacy and public affairs at the U.S. Department of State and the now independent agency, the International Broadcasting Bureau. USIA's broadcasting functions were moved to the Broadcasting Board of Governors, which had been created in 1994.

Since the merger of USIA with the Department of State, public diplomacy and public affairs sections at U.S. missions have carried on this work. When USIA was disbanded in 1999, USIS posts once again were operated by the Department of State.

Former USIA director of TV and film service Alvin Snyder recalled in his 1995 memoir that "the U.S. government ran a full-service public relations organization, the largest in the world, about the size of the twenty biggest U.S. commercial PR firms combined. Its full-time professional staff of more than 10,000, spread out among some 150 countries, burnished America's image and trashed the Soviet Union 2,500 hours a week with a 'tower of babble' comprised of more than 70 languages, to the tune of over $2 billion per year." The USIA was "the biggest branch of this propaganda machine".

== Stated mission ==
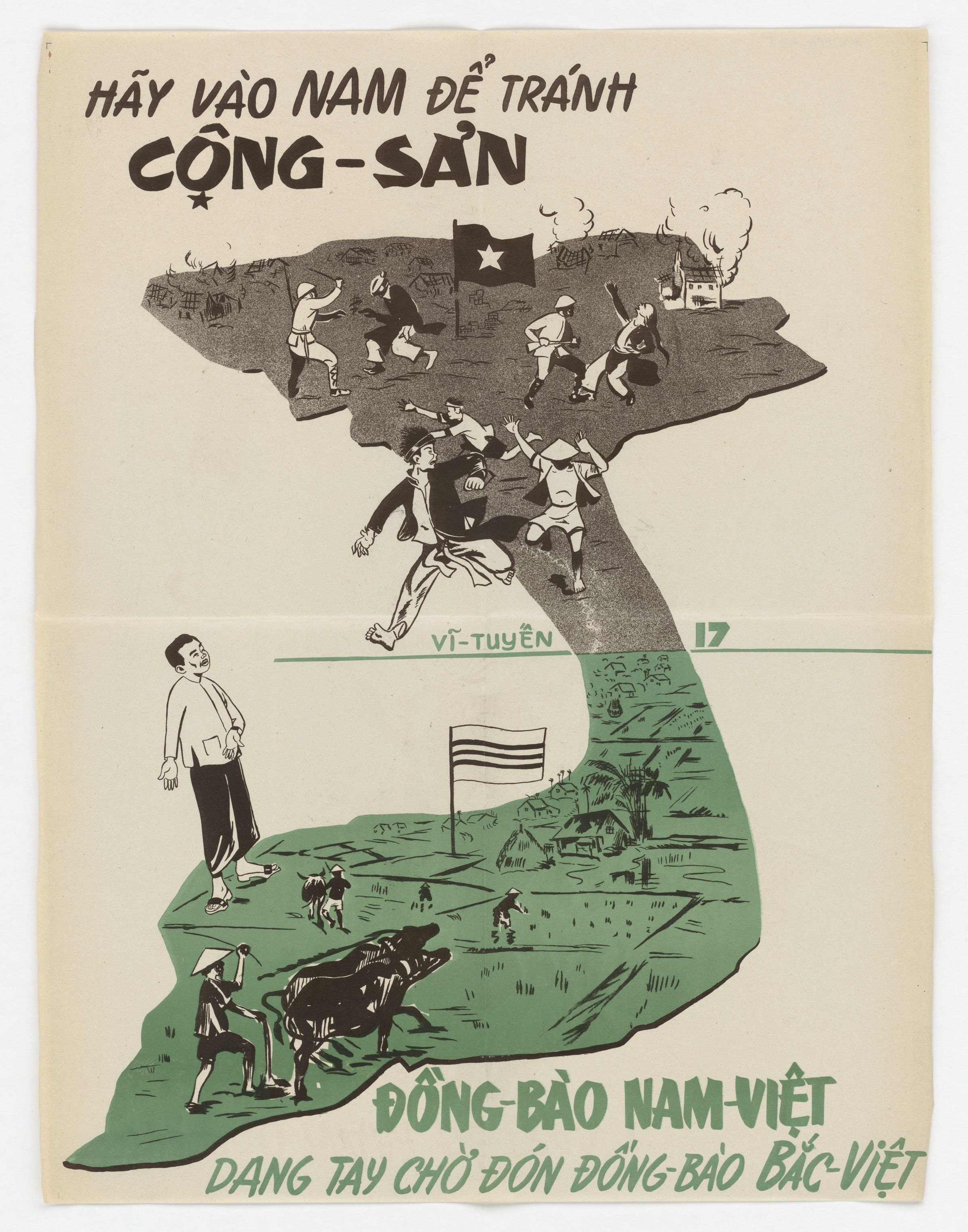
A propaganda poster produced by USIA, exhorting Northern Vietnamese residents to move South, in 1954.

President Dwight D. Eisenhower established the United States Information Agency on August 1, 1953, during the postwar tensions with the communist world known as the Cold War. The USIA's mission was "to understand, inform and influence foreign publics in promotion of the national interest, and to broaden the dialogue between Americans and U.S. institutions, and their counterparts abroad". The USIA was established "to streamline the U.S. government's overseas information programs, and make them more effective". It operated all of the foreign information activities formerly carried out by the Department of State's International Information Administration and Technical Cooperation Administration, as well as the Mutual Security Agency. USIA was also responsible for the overseas administration of the exchange of persons program formerly conducted by IIA. The USIA was the largest full-service public relations organization in the world, spending over $2 billion per year to highlight the views of the U.S. while diminishing those of the Soviet Union, through about 150 countries.

Its stated goals were to explain and advocate U.S. policies in terms that are credible and meaningful in foreign cultures; to provide information about the official policies of the United States, and about the people, values and institutions which influence those policies; to bring the benefits of international engagement to American citizens and institutions by helping them build strong long-term relationships with their counterparts overseas; and to advise the President and U.S. government policy-makers on the ways in which foreign attitudes would have a direct bearing on the effectiveness of U.S. policies. The Department of State provided foreign policy guidance.

During the Cold War, some American officials believed that a propaganda program was essential to convey the United States and its culture and politics to the world, and to offset negative Soviet propaganda against the US. With heightened fears about the influence of communism, some Americans believed that the films produced by the Hollywood movie industry, when critical of American society, damaged its image in other countries. The USIA "exist[ed] as much to provide a view of the world to the United States as it [did] to give the world a view of America". Films produced by the USIA could by law not be screened publicly within the United States due to the Smith–Mundt Act. This restriction also meant that Americans could not view the material even for study at the National Archives.

Within the US, the USIA was intended to assure Americans that "[t]he United States was working for a better world". Abroad, the USIA tried to preserve a positive image of the U.S. regardless of negative depictions from communist propaganda. One notable example was Project Pedro. This secretly funded project created newsreels in Mexico during the 1950s that portrayed communism unfavorably and the United States positively. Articles reflecting the views promoted by the USIA were frequently published under fictitious bylines, such as "Guy Sims Fitch".

Another project, this one aimed at Middle Eastern audiences, is "Tales from the Hoja." It consists of 23 films, most of which featured marionettes made by puppeteer Mary Chase. Made between 1953 and 1958, most of the films tell variations of Hodja fables with pro-United States and anti-communist messages. For example, one film tells the story of the blind men and the elephant. The films were made available to the public through the National Archives in 2019.

The agency regularly conducted research on foreign public opinion about the United States and its policies, in order to inform the president and other key policymakers. It conducted public opinion surveys throughout the world. It issued a variety of reports to government officials, including a twice-daily report on foreign media commentary around the world.

== Media and divisions ==
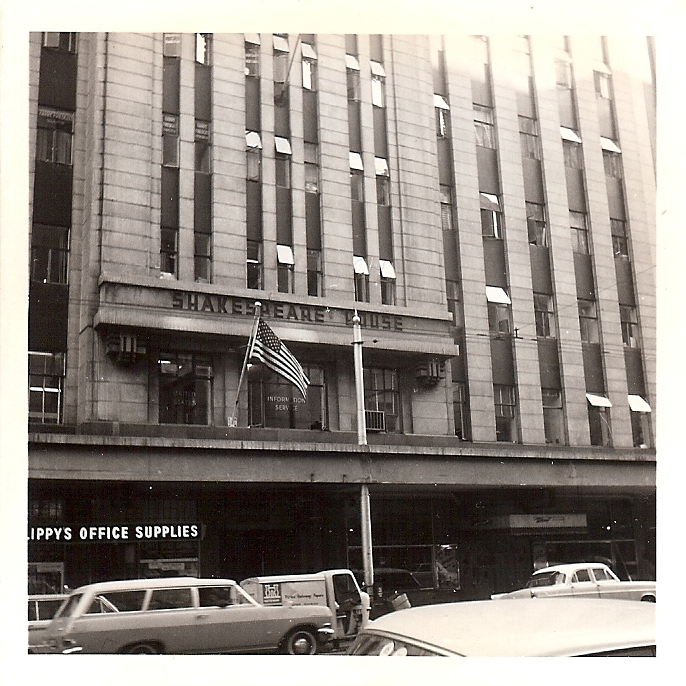
USIA library in Johannesburg, South Africa, in 1965, during the apartheid era.

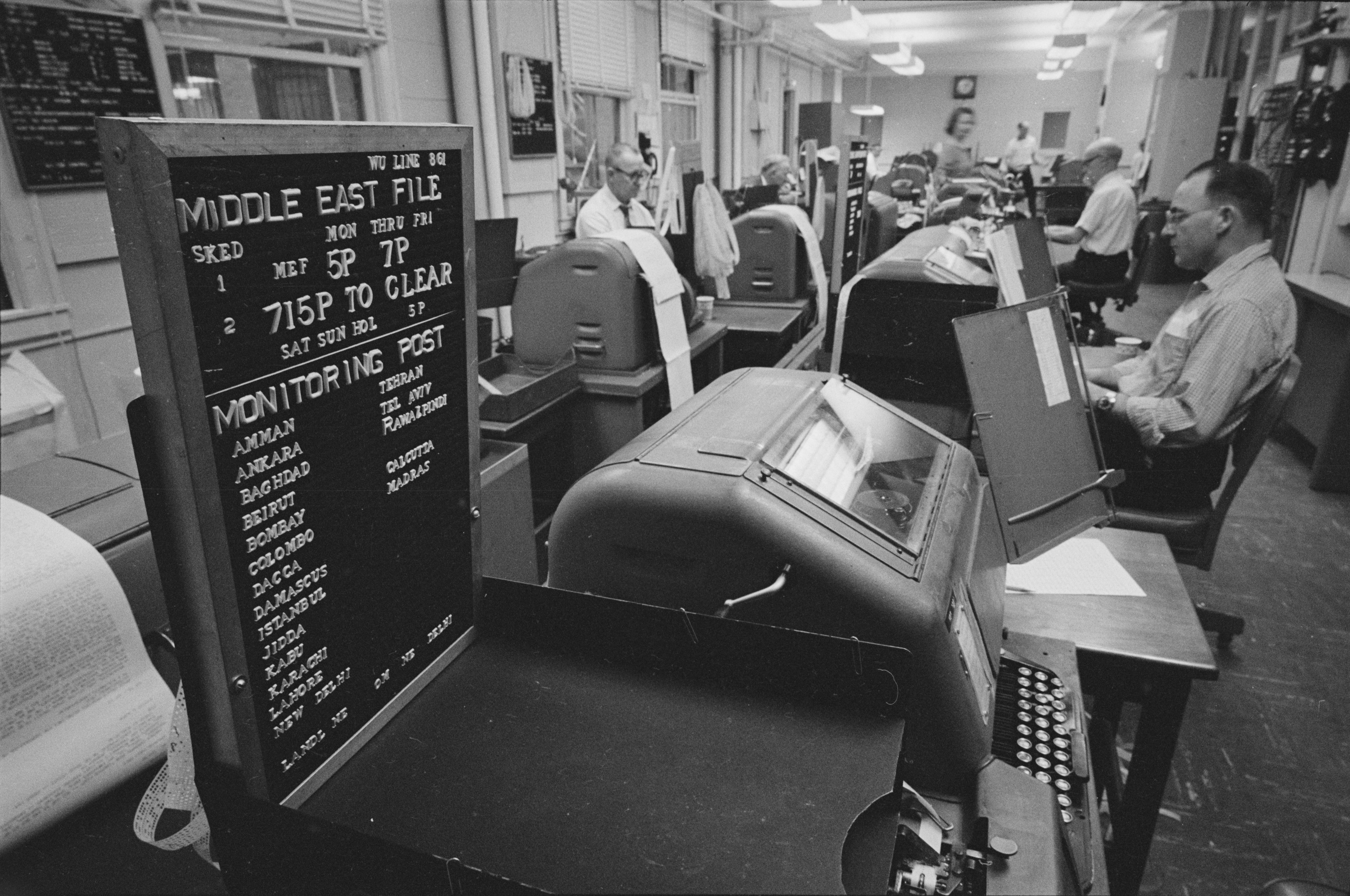
USIA employees at teleprinters monitoring Middle East activities, 1967

From the beginning, President Dwight Eisenhower said that "audiences would be more receptive to the American message if they were kept from identifying it as propaganda. Avowedly propagandistic materials from the United States might convince few, but the same viewpoints presented by the seemingly independent voices would be more persuasive." The USIA used various forms of media, including "personal contact, radio broadcasting, libraries, book publication and distribution, press motion pictures, television, exhibits, English-language instruction, and others". Through these different forms, the United States government distributed its materials more easily and engaged a greater concentration of people.

Four main divisions were established when the USIA began its programs.

- Broadcasting information
- Libraries and exhibits
- Press services
- Motion picture service

The first division dealt with broadcasting information, both in the United States and around the world. The radio was one of the most widely used forms of media at the onset of the Cold War, as television was not widely available. The Smith–Mundt Act authorized information programs, including Voice of America. Voice of America was intended as an unbiased and balanced "Voice from America", as originally broadcast during World War II. The VOA was used to "tell America's stories ... to information deprived listeners behind the Iron Curtain". By 1967, the VOA was broadcasting in 38 languages to up to 26 million listeners. In 1976 VOA gained its "Charter", requiring its news to be balanced.

The second division of the USIA consisted of libraries and exhibits. The Smith–Mundt Act and the Fulbright–Hays Act of 1961 both authorized international cultural and educational exchanges (including the Fulbright Scholarship Program). USIA would mount exhibitions in its libraries overseas to reach people in other countries. "Fulbrighters" were grant recipients under the USIA educational and cultural exchange program. To ensure that those grant programs would be fair and unbiased, persons of educational and cultural expertise in the grant subject areas selected the grantee recipients.

The USIA's third division included press services. Within its first two decades, the "USIA publishe[d] sixty-six magazines, newspapers, and other periodicals, totaling almost 30 million copies annually, in twenty-eight languages".

The fourth division dealt with the motion picture service. After the USIA failed in its effort to collaborate with Hollywood filmmakers to portray America in a positive light, the agency began producing their own documentaries.

=== Non-broadcast educational and information efforts ===
By the time the agency was reorganized in 1999, the educational and informational efforts encompassed a wide range of activities, outside of broadcasting. These were focused in four areas, the agency produced extensive electronic and printed materials.

- Information service
- Speakers and Specialists Program
- Information Resource Centers
- Foreign press centers

Its The Washington File information service, was intended to provide, in the words of the agency "both time-sensitive and in-depth information in five languages", incorporating full transcripts of speeches, Congressional testimony, articles by administration officials, and materials providing analysis of key issues. The agency also ran a number of websites to transmit information.

Second, the agency ran a "Speakers and Specialists Program", sending Americans abroad for various public speaking and technical assistance roles. These speakers were referred to as "American Participants" or "AmParts".

Third, the agency operated more than 100 "Information Resource Centers" abroad. These included some public-access libraries in developing countries.

Finally, the USIA-operated foreign press centers in Washington, New York, and Los Angeles to "assist resident and visiting foreign journalists". In other major American cities, such as Chicago, Houston, Atlanta, Miami, and Seattle, the USIA worked cooperatively with other international press centers.

Beginning with the 1958 Brussels World Fair, the USIA directed the design, construction, and operation of the U.S. pavilions representing the United States at major world Expos.

== Incidents ==
During the 1954 Lavon Affair Israeli operatives targeted the libraries of the U.S. Information Agency in Alexandria and Cairo, with homemade bombs, consisting of bags containing acid placed over nitroglycerine, which were inserted into books and placed on the shelves of the libraries just before closing time. Several hours later, as the acid ate through the bags, the bombs would explode. They did little damage to the targets and caused no injuries or deaths.

In 1957, USIA buildings in Taipei would be attacked during the May 24 incident.

== Abolition and restructuring ==
The Foreign Affairs Reform and Restructuring Act of 1998, Division G of the Omnibus Consolidated and Emergency Supplemental Appropriations Act, 1999, Pub. L. 105–277 (text) (PDF), 112 Stat. 2681-761, enacted October 21, 1998, abolished the U.S. Information Agency effective October 1, 1999. Its information and cultural exchange functions were folded into the Department of State under the newly created Under Secretary of State for Public Diplomacy and Public Affairs.

When dismantled, the agency budget was $1.109 billion. After reductions of staff in 1997, the agency had 6,352 employees, of which almost half were civil service employees in the United States (2,521). About 1,800 of these employees worked in international broadcasting, while approximately 1,100 worked on the agency's educational and informational programs, such as the Fulbright program. Foreign service officers consisting of about 1,000 members of the work force. Broadcasting functions, including Voice of America, Radio and TV Marti, Radio Free Europe (in Eastern Europe), Radio Free Asia, and Radio Liberty (in Russia and other areas of the former Soviet Union), were consolidated as an independent entity under the Broadcasting Board of Governors (BBG). This continues to operate independently from the State Department. In the late 1990s and early 2000s, some commentators characterized United States international broadcasters, such as Radio Free Asia, Radio Free Europe, and Voice of America as United States propaganda.

== See also ==
- WORLDNET Television and Film Service
- Committee on Public Information
- Crusade for Freedom
- Cultural diplomacy
- Clandestine HUMINT operational techniques
- Nine from Little Rock, an Academy Award-winning documentary by Charles Guggenheim, commissioned by the USIA
- U.S. Department of State's Bureau of International Information Programs
- Foreign Broadcast Information Service
- Arthur Kimball, initial, acting, director of the agency
- Leo P. Ribuffo
- Paul Child
