= Arlington Memorial Amphitheater =

Memorial Amphitheater
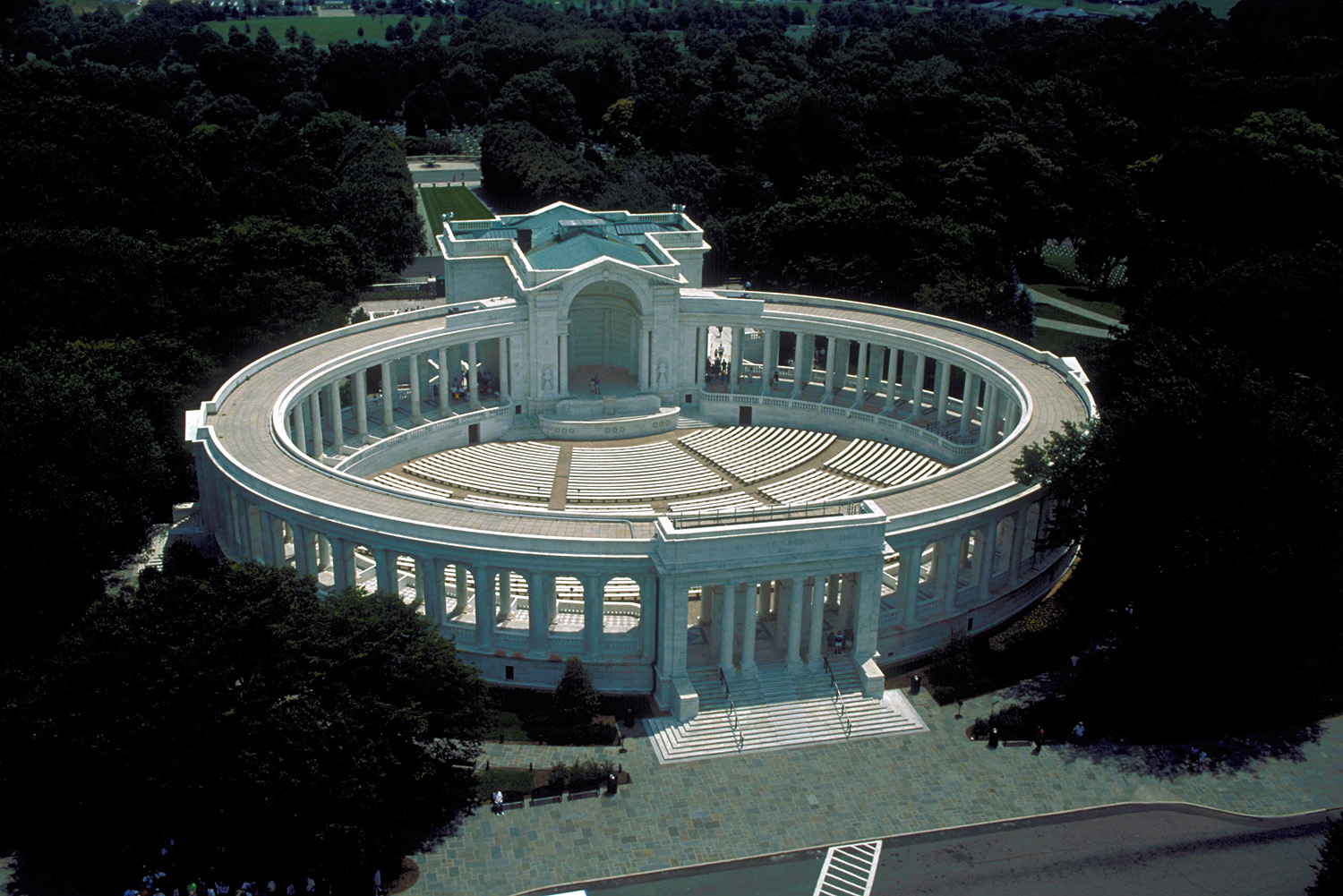
- Aerial view looking southeast at Memorial Amphitheater

- Location within Virginia
- 38°52.585′N 77°4.379′W
- Location: Arlington County, Virginia

History
- Established: May 15, 1920; 106 years ago

Site notes
- Governing body: U.S. Department of the Army

Memorial Amphitheater is an outdoor amphitheater, exhibit hall, and nonsectarian chapel located in Arlington National Cemetery in Arlington County, Virginia, United States. It was designed in 1913 as a replacement for the older, wooden amphitheater near Arlington House. Ground was broken for its construction in March 1915 and it was dedicated in May 1920. In the center of its eastern steps is the Tomb of the Unknown Soldier, dedicated in 1921. It has served as the site for numerous Veterans Day and Memorial Day events, as well as for memorial services and funerals for many individuals.

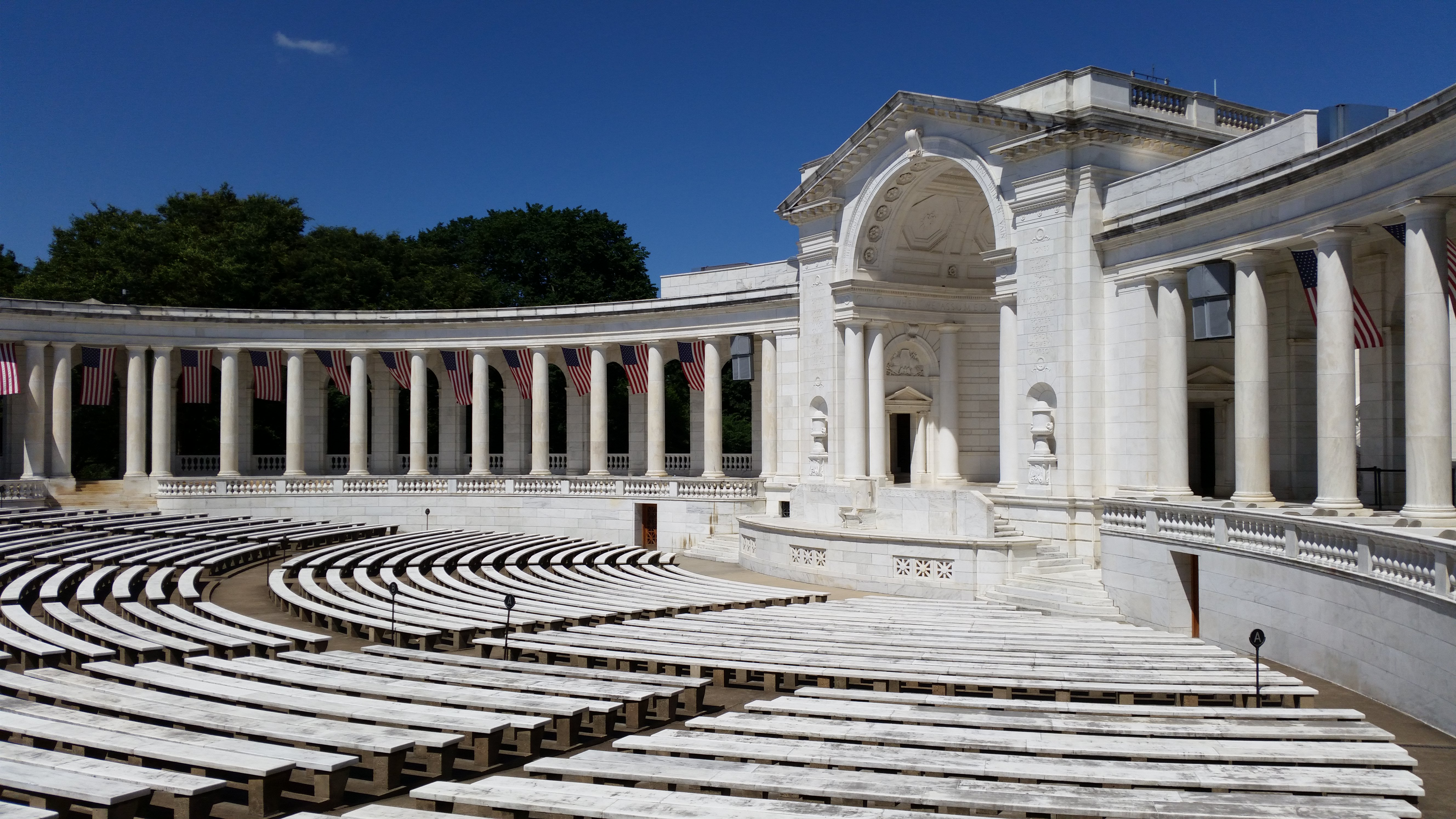
Arlington Memorial Amphitheater interior view

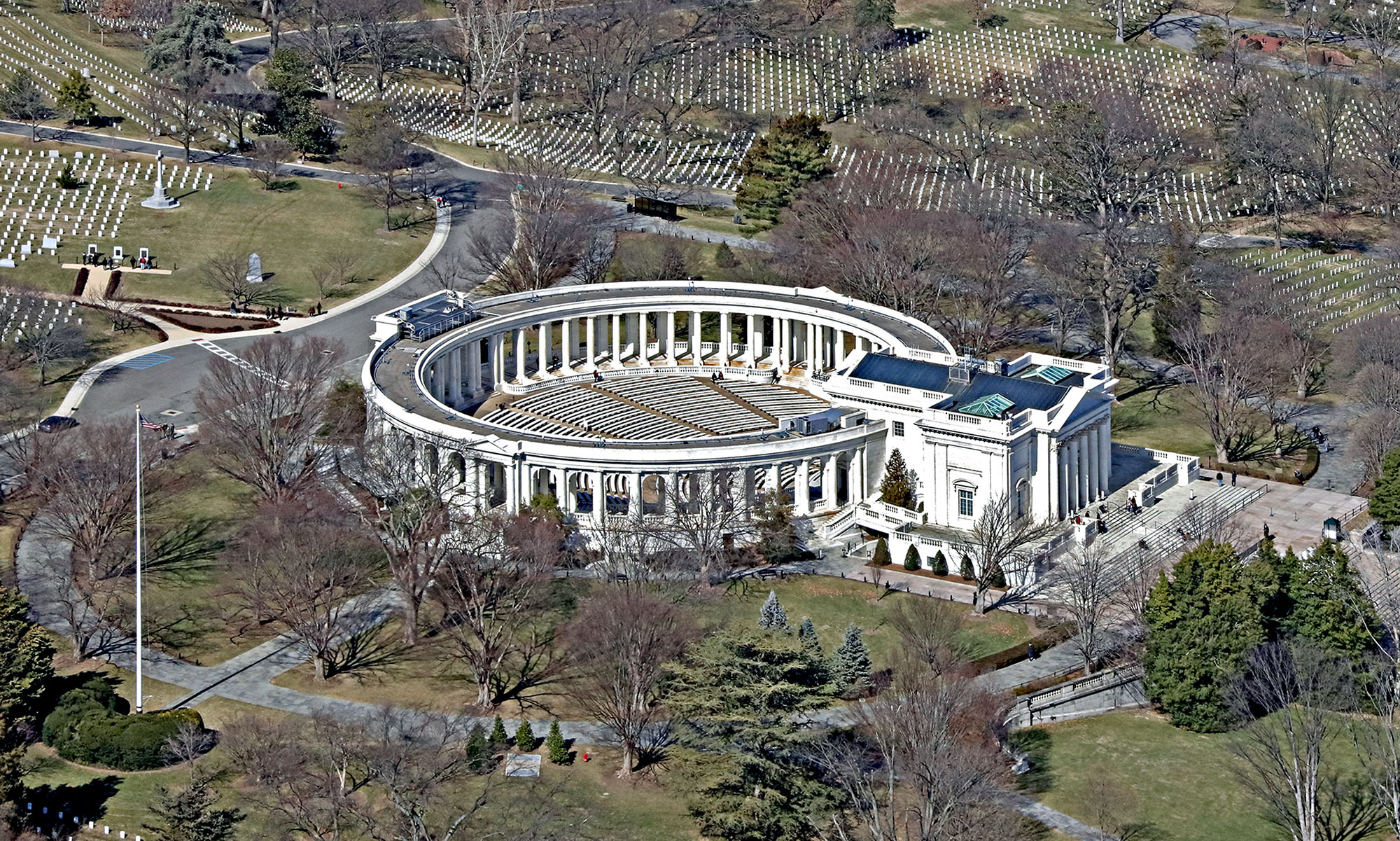
Arlington Memorial Amphitheater and Tomb of the Unknown Soldier

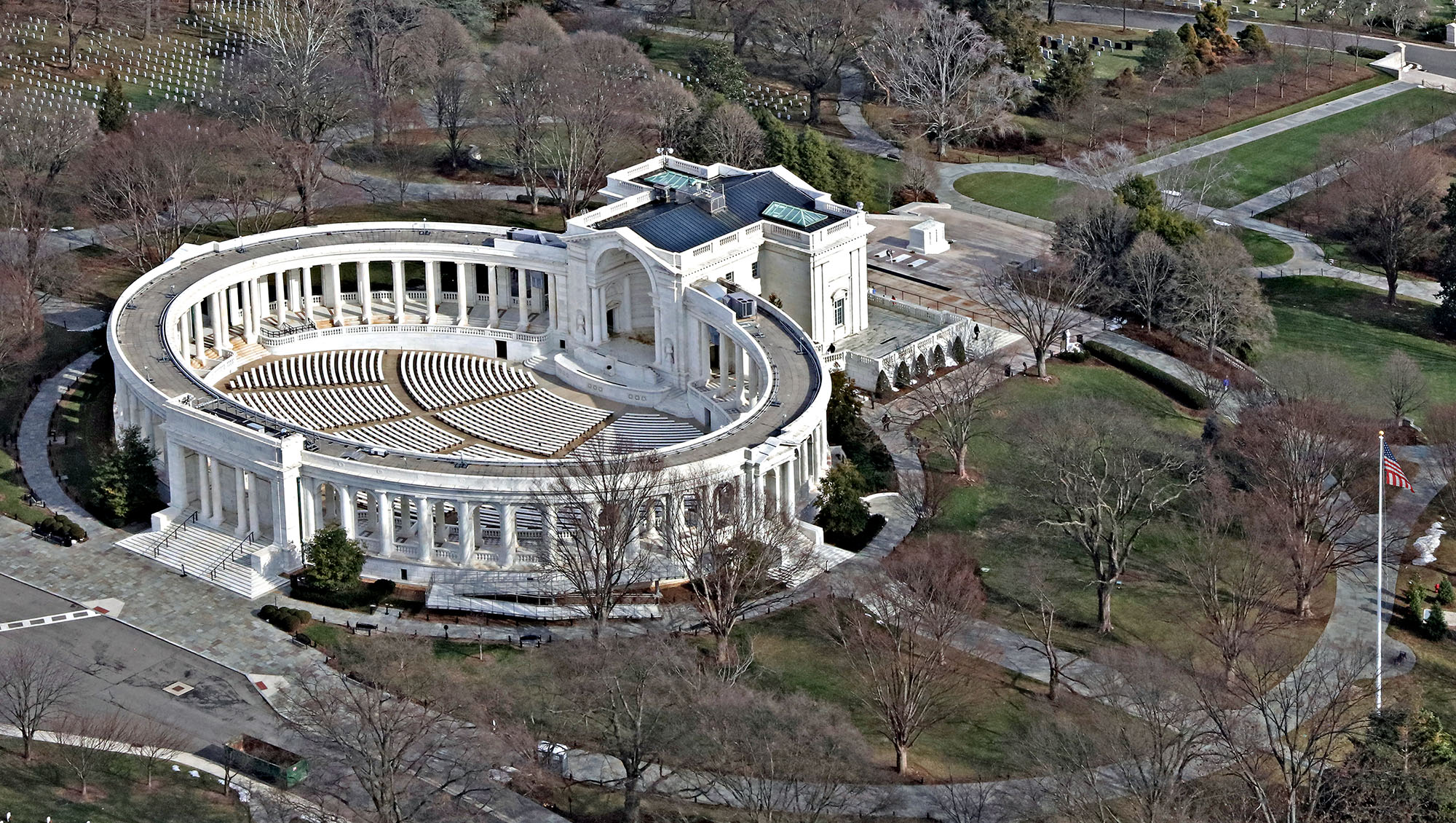
Arlington Memorial Amphitheater and Tomb of the Unknown Soldier

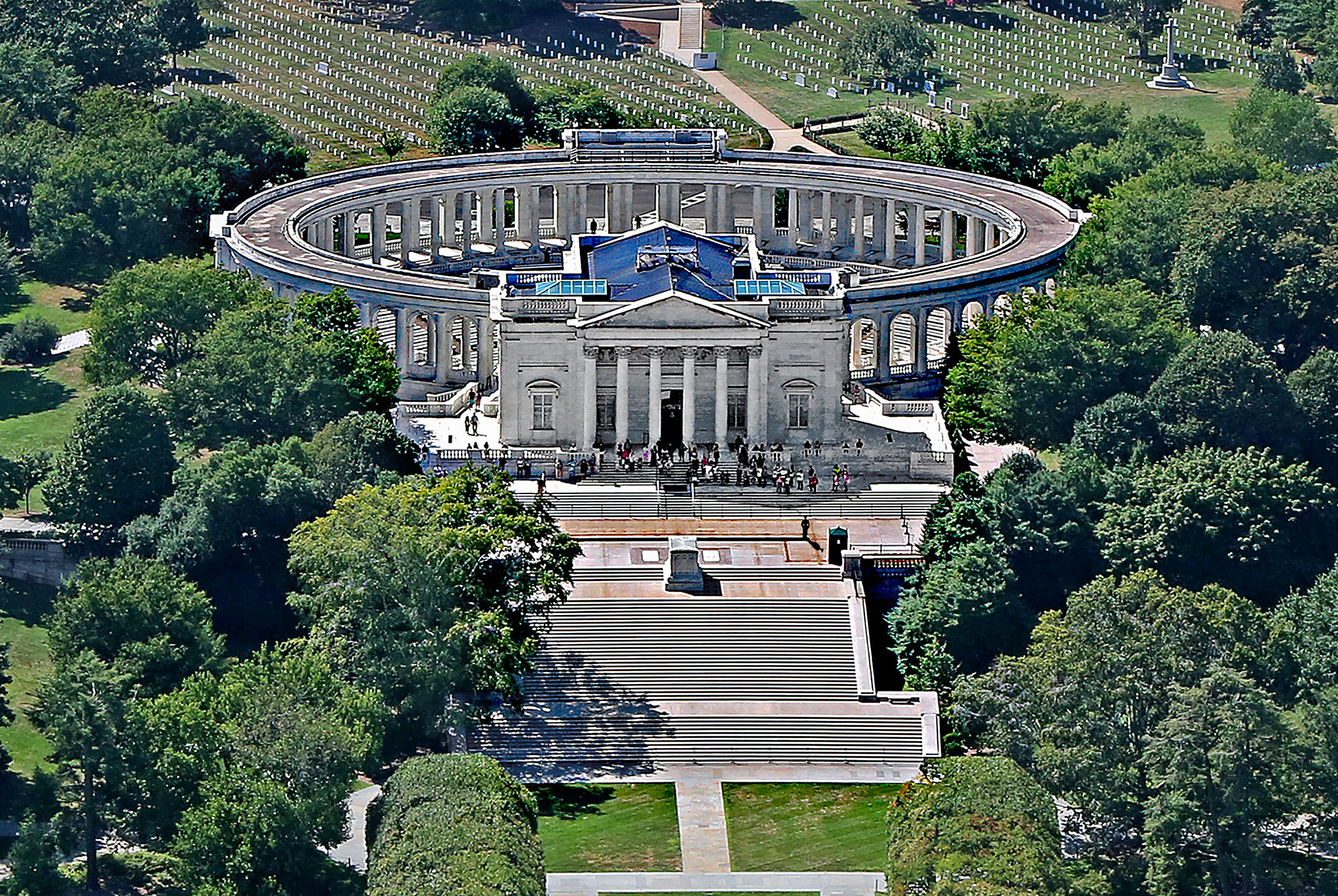
Arlington Memorial Amphitheater and Tomb of the Unknown Soldier

== Genesis ==
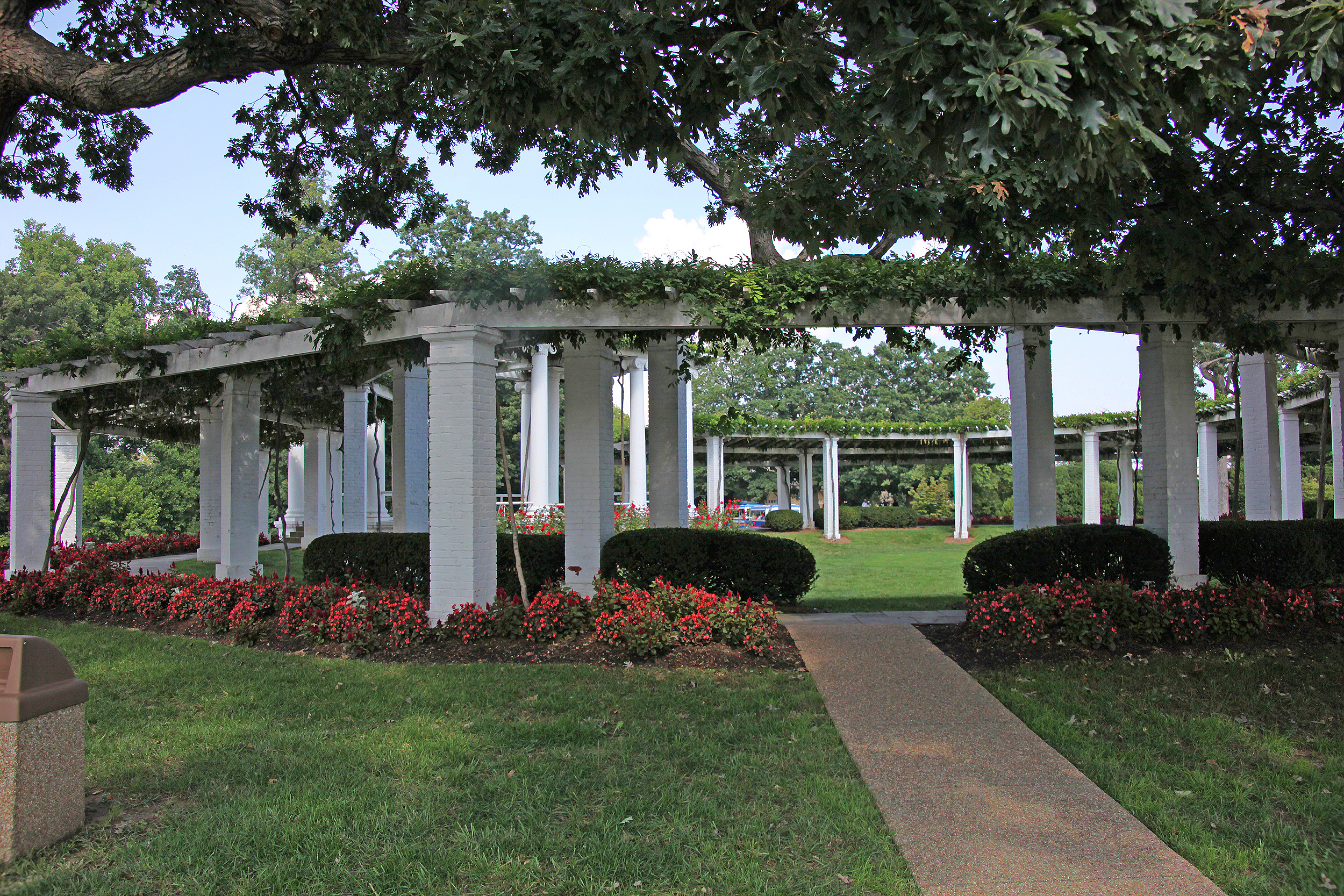
The Old Amphitheater (now named Tanner Amphitheater), whose small size, rustic nature, and connection to the Civil War prompted construction of Memorial Amphitheater.

Arlington National Cemetery was established in 1864. Due to the growing importance of the cemetery as well as the much larger crowds attending Memorial Day observances, Brigadier General Montgomery C. Meigs (who was Quartermaster General of the United States Army) decided a formal meeting space at the cemetery was needed. A grove of close-growing trees just southwest of Arlington House Grove was cut down and a wooden amphitheater (today known as the Tanner Amphitheater) constructed in 1873.

By the early years of the 1900s, however, the Old Amphitheater had grown far too small for the large ceremonies which were held there. Judge Ivory Kimball, Commander of the Department of the Potomac chapter of the Grand Army of the Republic (or GAR, a veterans' group for those who fought for the Union in the Civil War), believed that not only should a new and larger facility be built, but also that the new amphitheater represent the dead of all wars in which the nation had fought. Kimball and the GAR began their push for a new amphitheater in 1903, and sketches for the amphitheater drawn up by Frederick D. Owen, a civilian engineer working for the United States Army Corps of Engineers. But legislation failed to pass Congress in 1905, 1907, and 1908. Legislation passed in 1908 authorizing the establishment of a memorial commission, but it received only $5,000 in funding. Legislation was introduced again in 1912 by Senator George Sutherland. Sutherland's bill proposed construction of a 5,000-seat amphitheater with an underground crypt (for the burial of famous individuals) to cost no more than $750,000. Prospects for passage initially seemed dim. But during the third session of the 62nd Congress, a number of new federal memorials were approved, including the Arlington Memorial Bridge, the Lincoln Memorial, a memorial to women who served in the Civil War (now the American Red Cross National Headquarters), and a George Washington memorial auditorium. The successful push for new memorials helped supporters win the passage of legislation authorizing construction of Memorial Amphitheater. President William Howard Taft, in one of his last acts as president, signed the legislation into law on March 4, 1913.

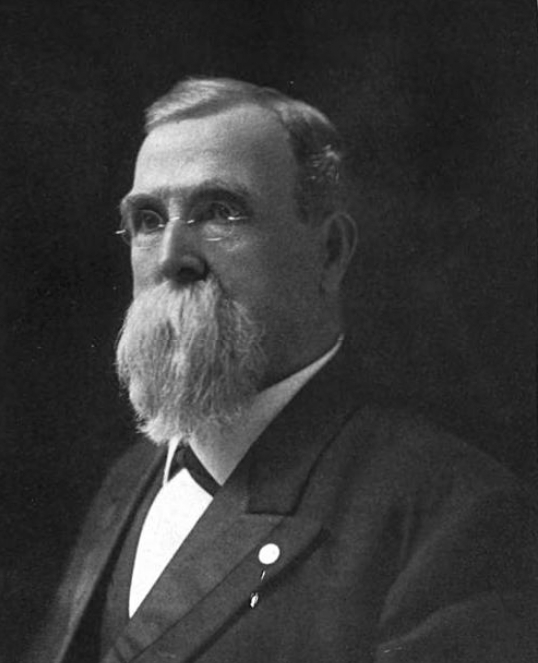
Judge Ivory Kimball, a primary backer of the new amphitheater, in 1909

The 1908 authorizing legislation established an Arlington Memorial Amphitheater Commission (AMAC) to oversee the design and construction of the structure. Its members included the Secretary of War, the Secretary of the Navy, the Superintendent of the U.S. Capitol, Judge Kimball (as a representative of the GAR), and Charles W. Newton (as a representative of the United Spanish War Veterans, a Spanish–American War veterans group).

It immediately became apparent, however, that although Congress had authorized the expenditure of $250,000 for Memorial Amphitheater, it had not actually appropriated any such funds from the U.S. Treasury. This left the AMAC without any funds to conduct its business. It was not until August 1, 1914, that Congress finally appropriated money for the amphitheater's construction. Ten days later, Colonel William W. Harts of the United States Army Corps of Engineers was elected the commission's executive director. On October 12, 1914, the AMAC contracted with the New York-based architectural firm of Carrère and Hastings to design the building. The AMAC hired the George A. Fuller Co. to construct it on February 11, 1915.

There is some disagreement among sources as to who should receive the majority of credit for designing Memorial Amphitheater. Lemos, Morrison, Warren, and Hewitt specifically name Thomas Hastings, as does the United States Commission of Fine Arts and others. But other sources name Frederick D. Owen, a civilian engineer working for the Corps of Engineers (and who also designed the flag of the president of the United States). Owen is named by architectural historians Butler and Wilson and by historian Rick Atkinson. The Arlington Memorial Amphitheater Commission is not clear as to who deserves the credit, as it notes that Owen "drew the first sketches for plans for the great Memorial in 1904" and later gave "suggestions and advice as to the form of the Memorial". Owen's significant role is made clear by the AMAC in other ways as well: He designed the memorial trowel used by President Woodrow Wilson to lay the cornerstone; he served on the reception committee for the cornerstone laying ceremony; he co-chaired the planning committee for the 1921 dedication; and he chaired the reception committee for the dedication. But the AMAC also said Carrère and Hastings prepared the plans for the building, provided the explanation of the design to the AMAC, and was named by Congress as the architects.

The AMAC's composition changed somewhat after Congress amended the commission's authorizing legislation on March 3, 1915. Congress added the leader of Camp 171, United Confederate Veterans of the District of Columbia, to the commission as a full voting member.

== Design ==
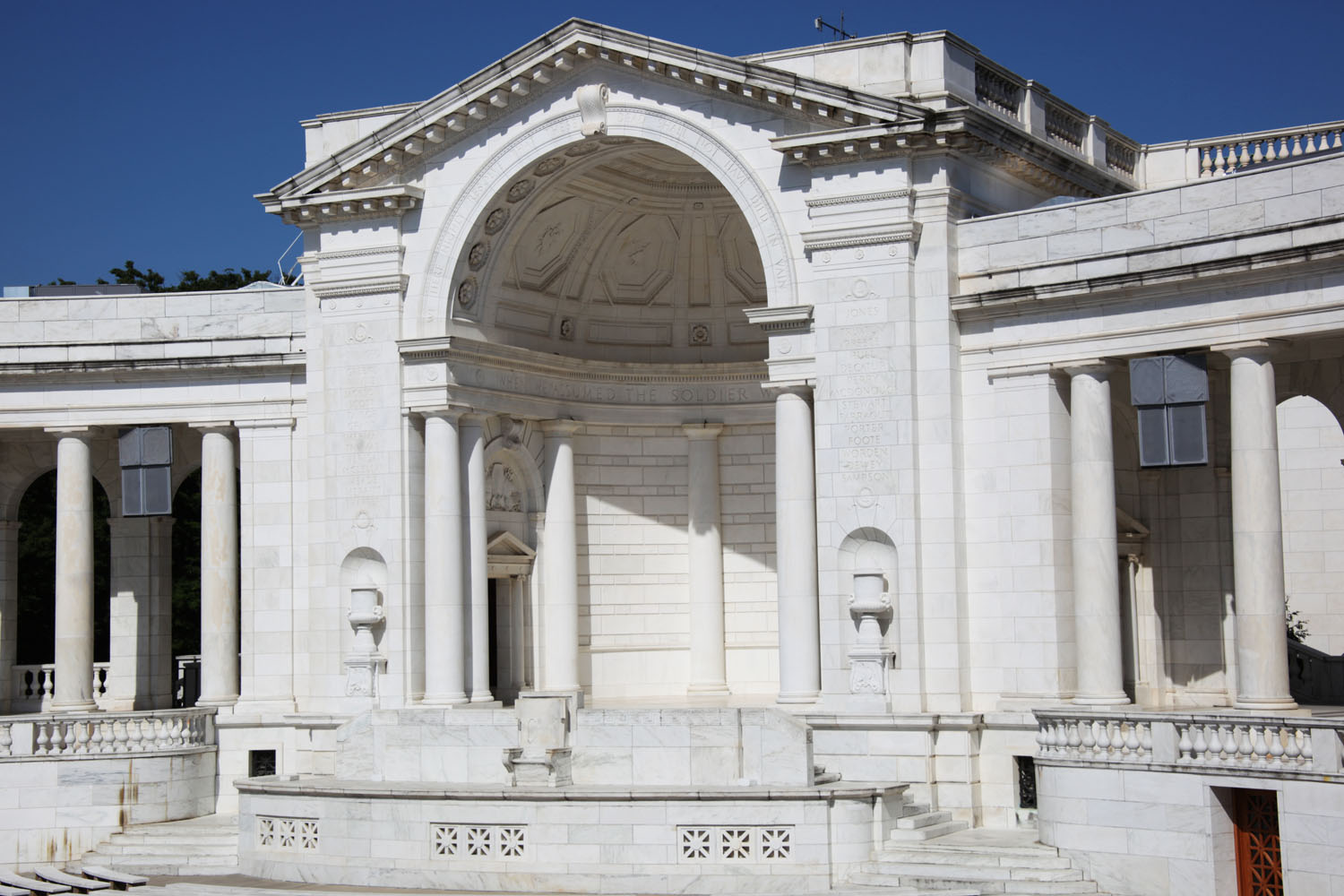
Apse, three-level stage, and klismos chair in the amphitheater

Memorial Amphitheater was designed by Thomas Hastings to be the center of a biaxial grouping of landscape features and monuments that included the USS Maine Mast Memorial in the west, the Spanish–American War Memorial to the south, and a formal Italianate garden to the east. Greek Revival, Romanesque Revival, and Renaissance decorative elements are used throughout the structure. Ulysses Ricci designed the various friezes, ornamental devices, and decorative elements of the amphitheater and entrance hall. Hastings said he wanted Memorial Amphitheater to be the building he was most remembered by.

As constructed, Memorial Amphitheater consisted of an elliptical outdoor amphitheater that sat 4,000. The bays formed by the colonnade can seat another 150 individuals. Another 1,000 individuals may be accommodated by standing.

The amphitheater is surrounded by a colonnade, with main entrances at the east and west axes. The capitals of the columns are Doric, but rest on an Attic base. The entablature above the columns, however, is Ionic to allow for inscriptions. These inscriptions, on the exterior of the entablature, list 44 major battles from the American Revolutionary War through the Spanish–American War. Low, backless marble benches in concentric circles face the semi-circular main stage, which has three levels. The lowest level features a klismos, a form of ancient Greek informal chair meant for rulers. The klismos chair faces the audience, much as a cathedra (or bishop's chair) does. Hastings intended the klismos chair to remind the audience of the missing heroes honored by the amphitheater. The second level of the stage has a podium. The stage and amphitheater are designed so that any speaker must look down at the klismos chair while addressing the audience, and must look at the USS Maine Mast Memorial if looking up. The third and uppermost level of the stage contains a semi-circular seating area for about 100 people and an apse in the back.

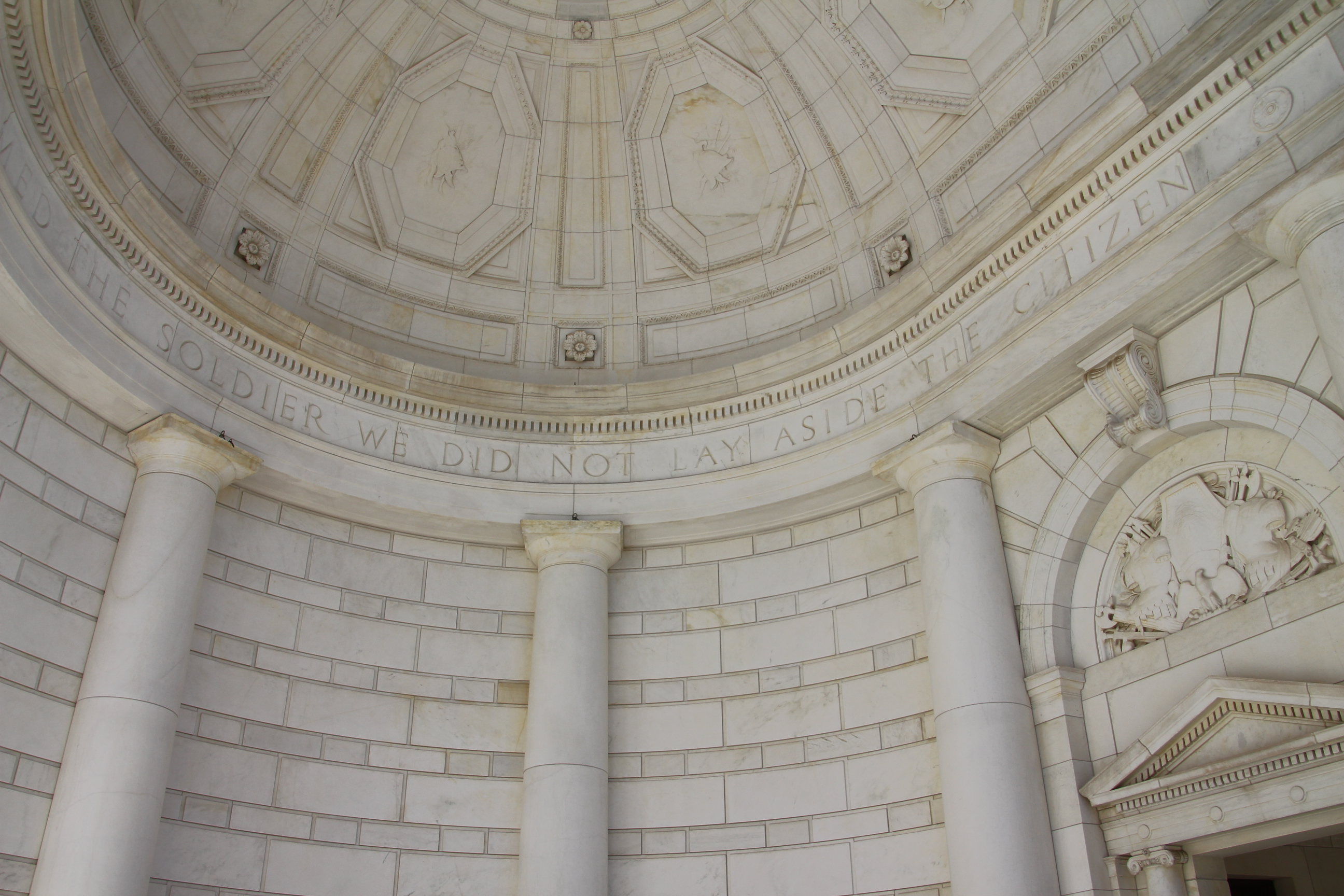
Inscription within the apse: "When we assumed the soldier we did not lay aside the citizen"

The interior dome of the apse is richly carved, and the square pilasters on either side of the stage list the names of famous American generals (left, as you face the stage) and admirals (right) from the American Revolutionary War through the Spanish–American War.

A quotation from George Washington's address to the New York Provincial Congress on June 26, 1775 is inscribed inside the apse of the Memorial Amphitheater. It says, "When we assumed the soldier we did not lay aside the citizen." It is an excerpt of this quotation: "When we assumed the Soldier, we did not lay aside the Citizen, & we shall most sincerely rejoice with you in that happy Hour, when the Establishment of American Liberty on the most firm, & solid Foundations, shall enable us to return to our private Stations in the bosom of a free, peaceful, & happy Country."

A quote from President Abraham Lincoln's Gettysburg Address is inscribed above the stage. It says, "We here highly resolve that these dead shall not have died in vain."

Decorative 9-foot (2.7 m) tall urns carved with eagles, rams' heads, and snakes were placed on pedestals in niches on either side of the stage.

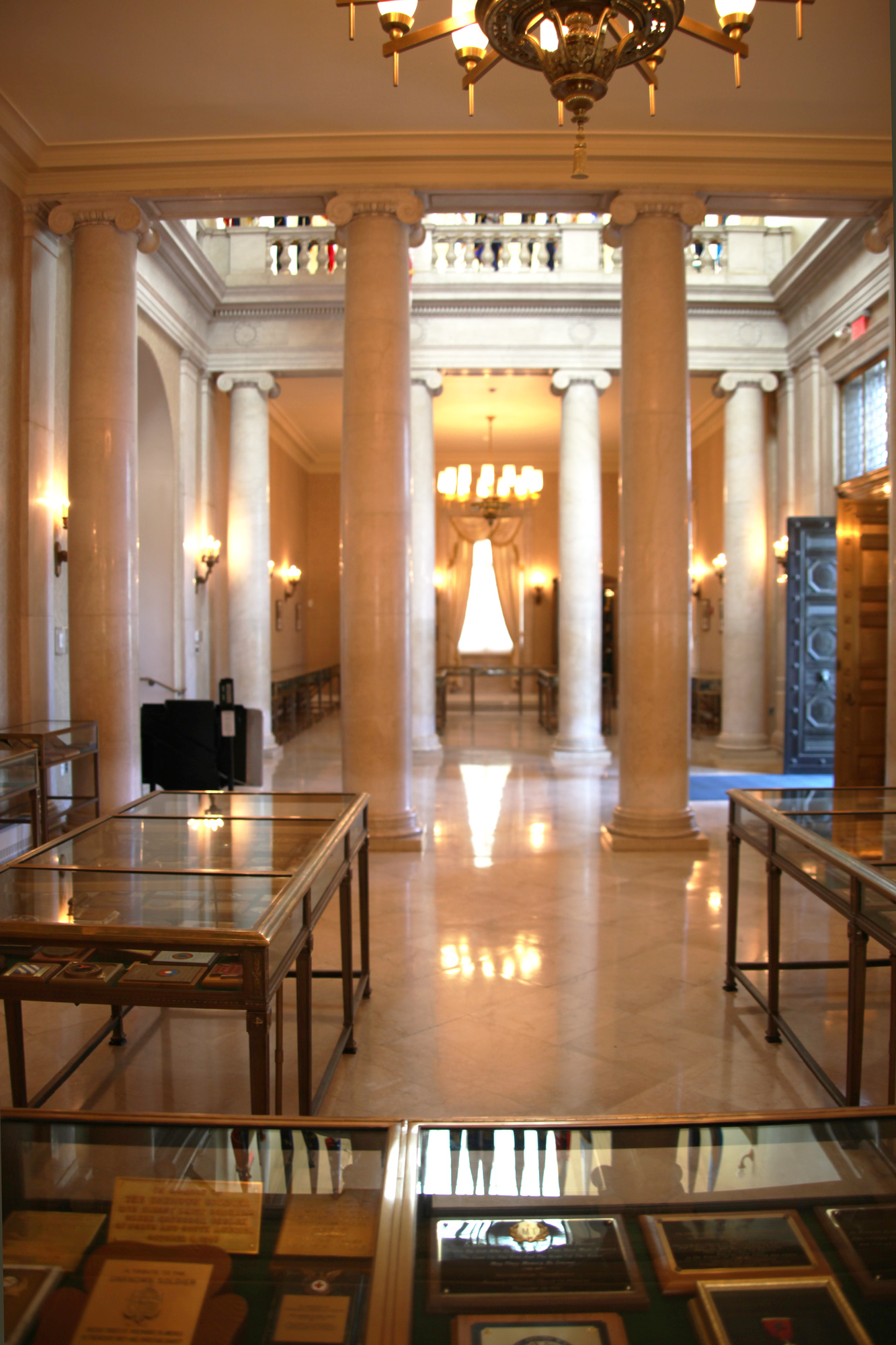
South gallery of the entrance hall, looking north, with main doors on right

Above the west entrance of the amphitheater is a quote from the Roman poet Horace: "Dulce et decorum est pro patria mori" ("It is sweet and fitting to die for one's country"). Under the colonnade are 300 crypts, which were intended for the burial of important people.

In the basement (or ground floor, if approached from the west) beneath the amphitheater stage is a chapel. This domed structure was designed to seat 150, and has a raised ambulatory around the edges.

As originally designed, the main entrance was in the east through the doors of the cruciform entrance hall. The entrance hall is fronted by a six-columned portico with Corinthian capitals. A frieze above the main bronze doors depicts symbolic trophies of war. The entrance hall is not connected internally with the amphitheater. Stairways, bridges, and short corridors on the outside of the entrance hall provide access to the stage in the amphitheater. The main floor of the reception hall is clad in Botticino marble. The main floor originally housed a reception hall (with two side galleries for the display of battle flags and war trophies) and stage, and the second floor housed a museum. In 1929, the main floor became a Memorial Exhibit Hall displaying honors received by the unknown soldiers lying beneath the Tomb of the Unknowns, and the second floor became offices.

Steps lead from the main doors of the entrance hall down to a small plaza. Hastings designed a series of short steps to lead from the plaza down to a landing, and then a series of monumental steps to lead from the landing to the eastern formal garden below. In the center of the short steps was a pedestal for a statue. No artwork was ever placed there. This pedestal was later removed, and the Tomb of the Unknowns took its place in 1921. The planned monumental steps leading down to the formal garden were not built when Memorial Amphitheater was dedicated. A retaining wall with false arches was constructed instead.

A roadway was designed to cross the plaza and circle the entire structure.

== Construction ==
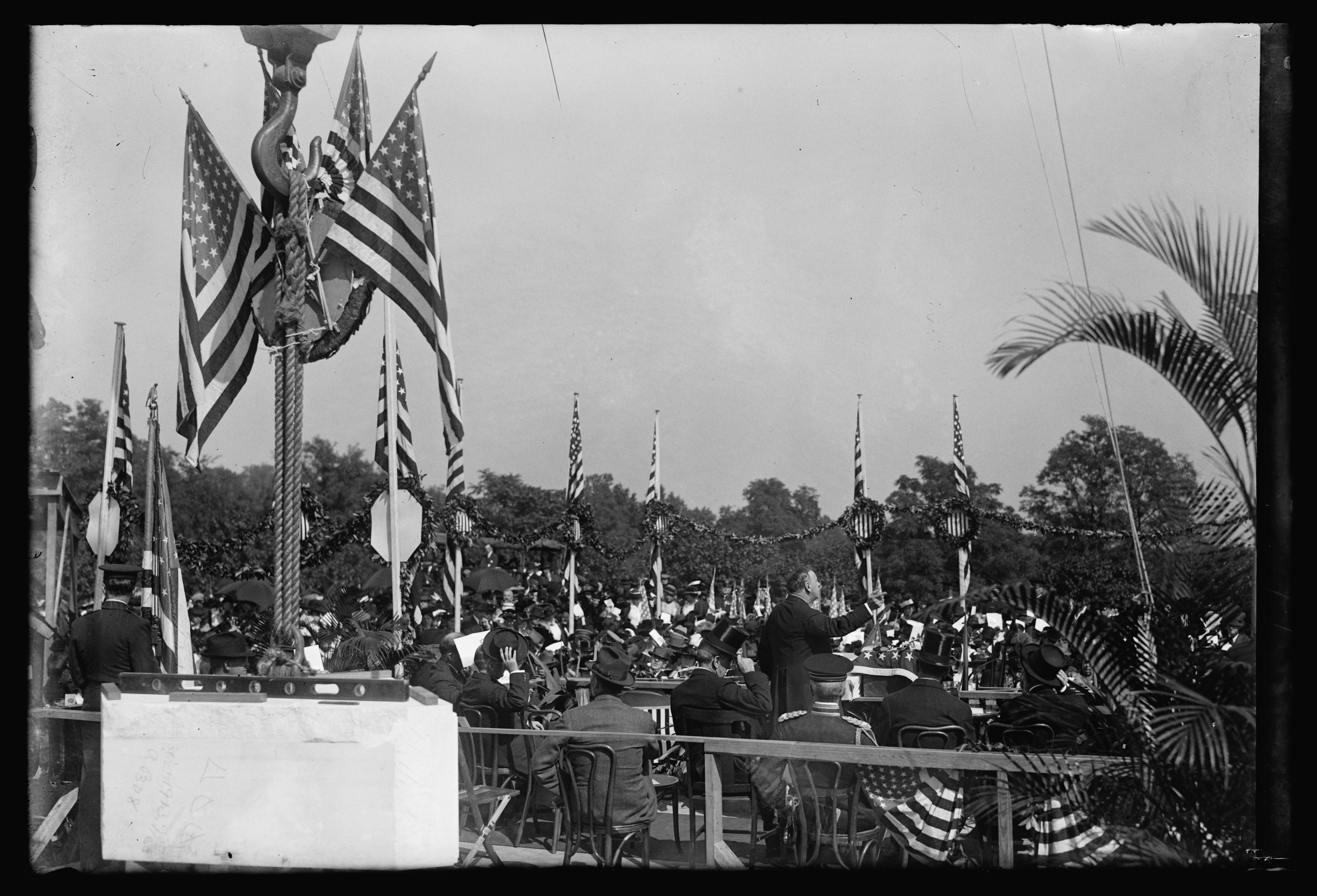
Cornerstone

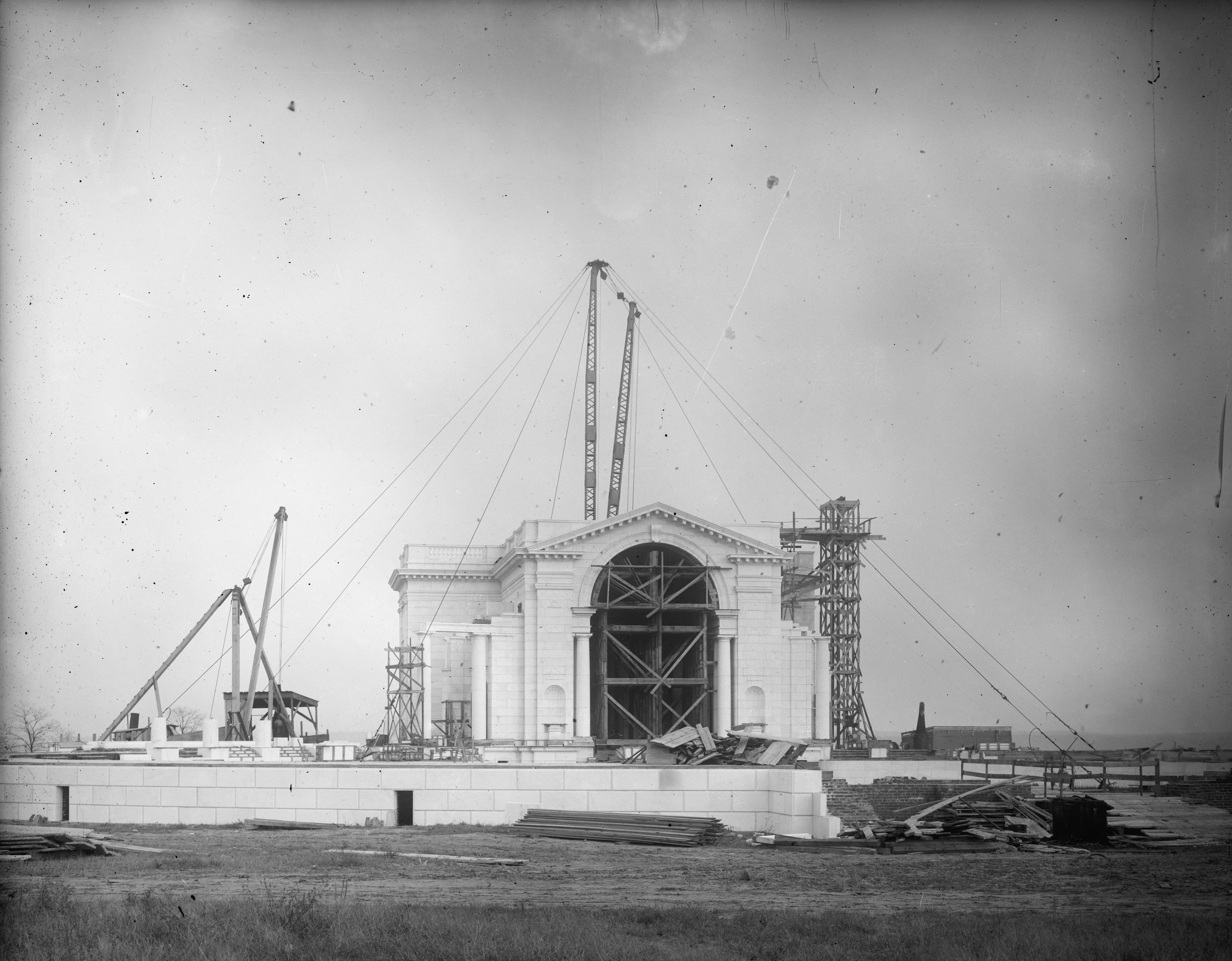
Construction begins on Memorial Amphitheater in 1916

The site chosen for the new Memorial Amphitheater was the top of a hill about 1,000 feet (300 m) south of Arlington House. A gravel pit, opened in the mid-1800s, existed there previously.

Ground for Memorial Amphitheater was broken on March 1, 1915. President Woodrow Wilson laid its cornerstone in a ceremony on October 13, 1915. A copper box placed in a hollowed out section of the cornerstone contained a copy of the United States Constitution, a copy of the United States Declaration of Independence, the Bible, the flag of the United States, one each of every coin and postage stamp then in circulation, a Congressional directory, a telephone directory of the District of Columbia, an autographed photograph of President Wilson, and several items connected with Arlington National Cemetery. Kimball participated in the ground-breaking and cornerstone ceremonies, but did not live to see the amphitheater completed: He died on May 15, 1916.

Excavation of the foundation was complete by the end of June 1915. Concrete foundations had also been laid and cured, and most of the brick foundation was in place as well. Most of the amphitheater's foundation was complete by June 30, 1916. The foundation included 629,000 bricks, 24 short tons (22 t) of structural steel, and 21,644 cubic yards (16,548 m^{3}) of marble (for the exterior of the structure). The Guastavino tile system, patented in 1885, was used to create arches and vaults in the basement. More than 2,500 square feet (230 m^{2}) of this tile were used. The heating, clean water, and sewage systems were also complete. The Corps of Engineers also finished the architectural drawings for the approaches around the amphitheater as well, and was ready to start work on them.

A major design changed also occurred in June 1915. Originally, plans for the amphitheater called for wooden balustrades, plaster moldings, cement floors and ceilings, and wooden doors. But on June 26, all of these materials were changed to marble. The total cost of the changes was $41,000.

Work on the amphitheater slowed in mid-1916 and throughout 1917 due to a lack of high quality marble available for the work. Severe winter weather also meant that work on the approaches did not begin until late June 1917. The amphitheater was supposed to have neared completion on February 15, 1917, but these lengthy delays meant that the construction schedule was extended for a full year. The amphitheater was also proving to be much more costly than expected. Bids from contractors were all far above what the Corps of Engineers expected, but work went ahead anyway. By June 30, 1917, much of the amphitheater and its colonnade were done. Another 35,140 cubic feet (995 m^{3}) of marble had been placed for the columns, and 11,856 cubic feet (335.7 m^{3}) of concrete and 26 short tons (24 t) of structural steel were used to support them. Skylights and ornamental ironwork stairs were in place, and ornamental plastering and marble carving had begun.

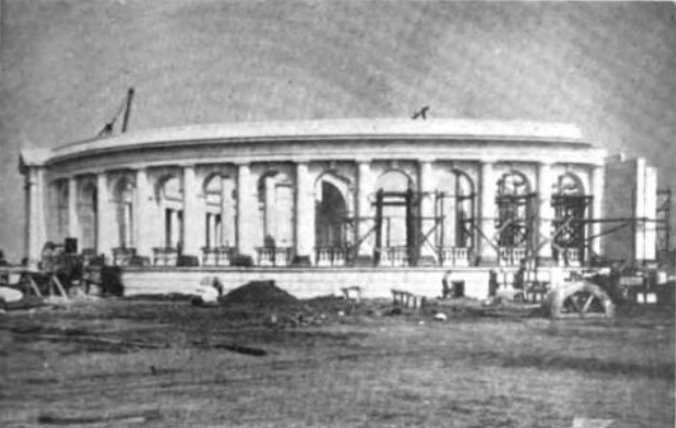
Memorial Amphitheater under construction in 1917

The amphitheater, chapel, and most of the entrance hall were finished in 1918. The entrance hall was built with red brick (257,100 of them), and clad in 57,711 cubic feet (1,634.2 m^{3}) of marble. Another in 1,060 cubic feet (30 m^{3}) of marble were used for interior columns. The extent to which marble was used was eye-opening: 4,790 square feet (445 m^{2}) for flooring, 4,694 square feet (436.1 m^{2}) for stairs, 1,272 square feet (118.2 m^{2}) for door and window frames, and 2,033 feet (620 m) of moldings. The eastern steps consumed 4,526 square feet (420.5 m^{2}) of concrete. The interior was decorated with ornamental plaster, terra cotta partitions, terrazzo flooring, bronze doors and grillwork, ornamental ironwork railings and stairs, and glazed tile. While more than $7,000 ($161,500 in 2013 inflation-adjusted U.S. dollars) was spent on carving for the amphitheater, just $2,933 was spent for carving on the inside and outside of the entrance hall.

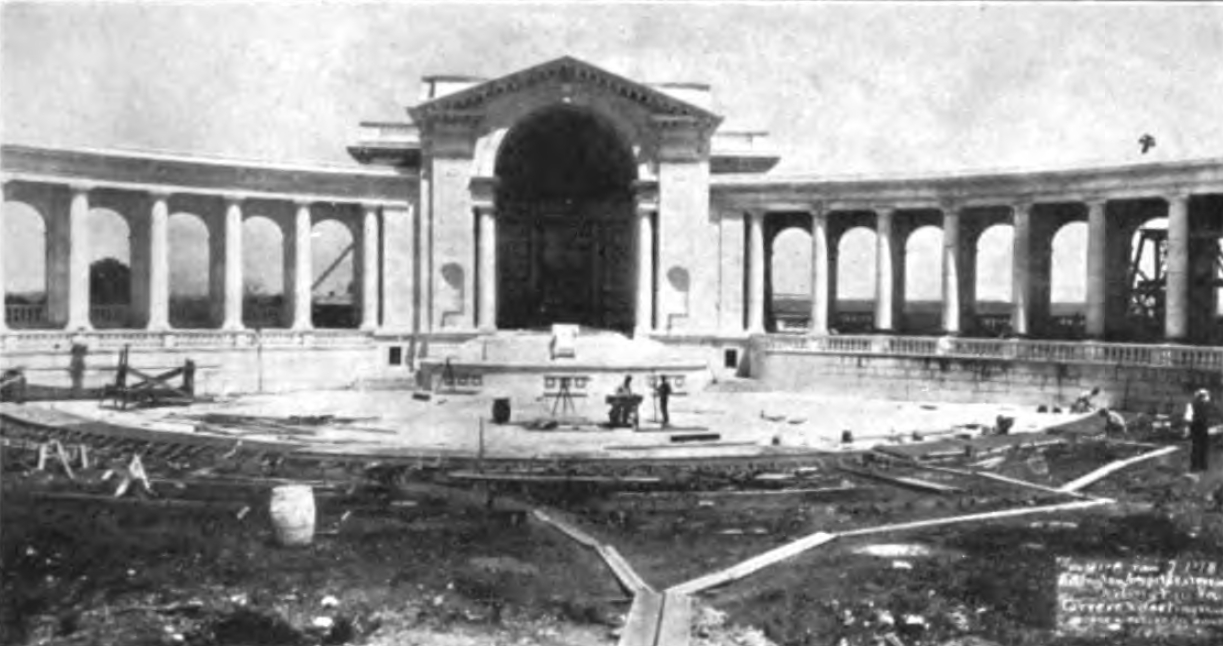
Construction progress on Memorial Amphitheater in June 1918

The advent of World War I had a significant impact on the construction of Memorial Amphitheater. The United States entered the war in April 1917, and by spring 1918 American troops were arriving in Europe. Most skilled workers were diverted to the war effort, although artisans (such as marble carvers) were still available. The Corps of Engineers was able to obtain, after lengthy delays, the high-quality marble it needed for the approaches from the island of Vinalhaven, Maine. But railroads and cargo ships were so congested carrying war materiél and military personnel that the marble could not be transported to Arlington National Cemetery until late 1917. By then, another severe winter had set in. Intensely cold weather continued into the late spring, further delaying work. Only a limited amount of work on the approaches had concluded by the end of June 1918. Some modifications were also made to the structure because of the war. The largest of these changes eliminated the seating planned for the top of the colonnade.

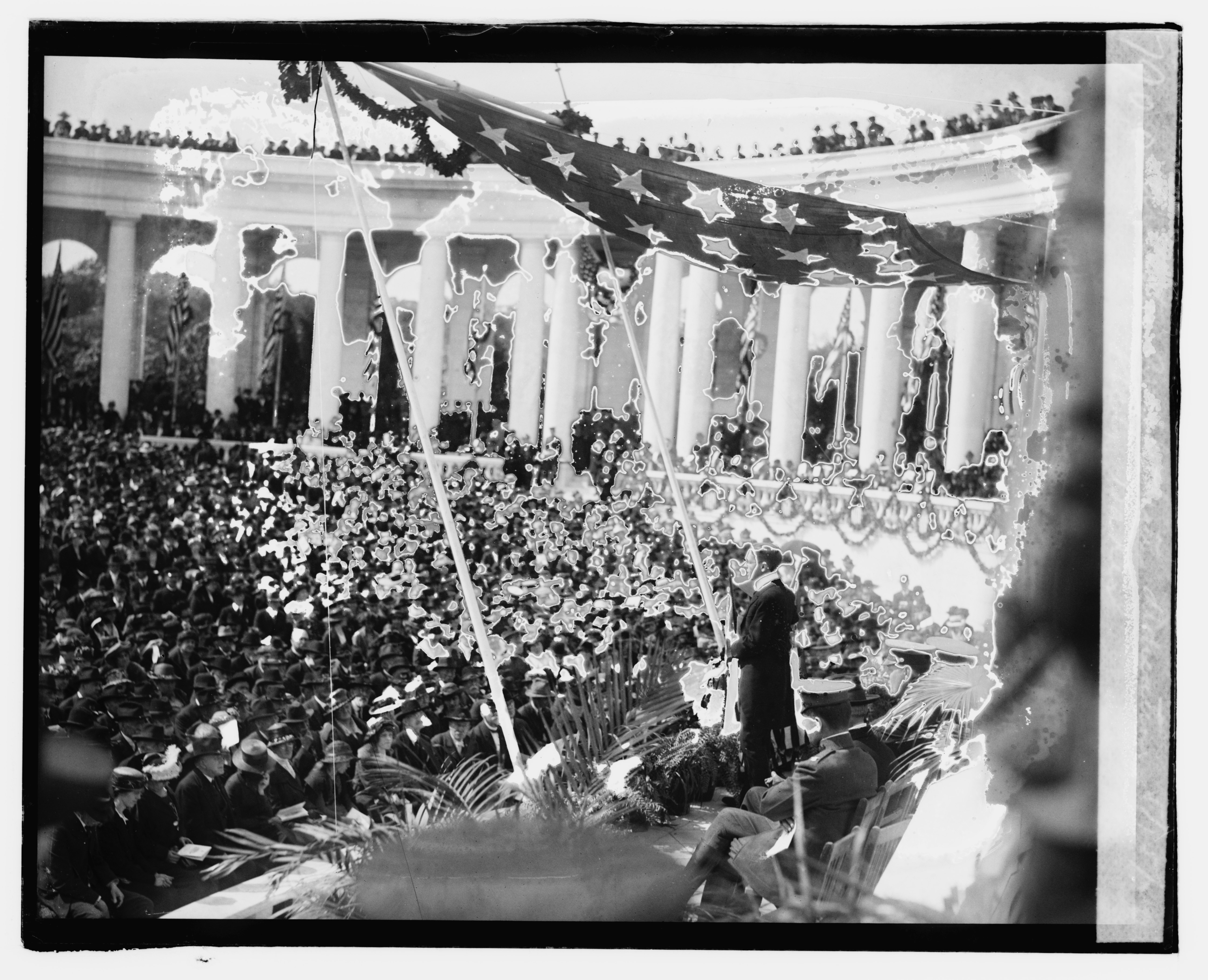
Secretary of War Newton D. Baker dedicates the Arlington Amphitheater on 15 May 1920

By June 1918, nearly all of Memorial Amphitheater's exterior was complete. The interior work on the chapel and the first-floor reception hall was also done, leaving only the basement-level kitchen storage areas and the second-floor offices to be worked on. Construction of the concrete floor of the amphitheater also was under way.

Interior work on Memorial Amphitheater ended in June 1919. The remainder of the basement rooms and all of the second floor were now finished, too. All that remained to be done was decoration of the chapel ceiling, some interior and exterior inscriptions, and installation of lighting fixtures. The Corps of Engineers was also ready to connect the water and sewer lines, grade the grounds and roads, and install plantings and sod. During the next nine months, these items were all finished, and the interior painted. The masonry approaches were also completed, and the roadways and sidewalks paved. The G.B. Mullin Co. did the landscape design and work, which involved replanting 20 cedar trees around the three amphitheater entrances. The total cost of the structure and its grounds was $810,812. In total, 87,000 cubic feet (2,500 m^{3}) of Mountain White marble from the Danby quarries of Vermont were used in its construction.

Memorial Amphitheater was dedicated on May 15, 1920. The Corps of Engineers turned it over to the Quartermaster General's office on July 1.

== History ==
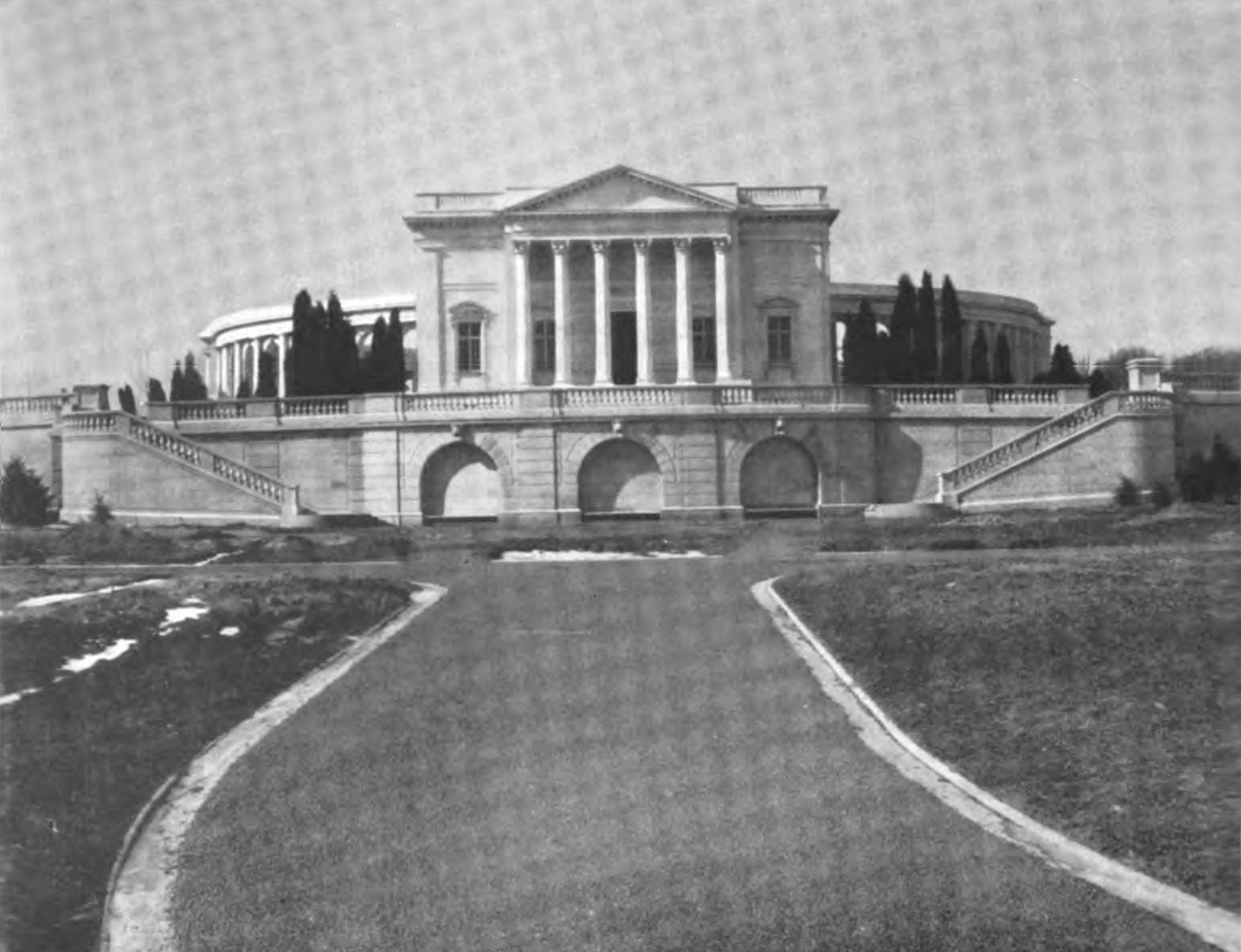
Memorial Amphitheater after its completion in 1921

=== Construction of the monumental stairs ===
On March 4, 1921, the Congress approved the construction of a memorial to an unidentified American serviceman from World War I to be placed in the stairs leading up from the east landing to the plaza in front of Memorial Amphitheater. An unknown soldier was identified and brought back from France, and interred inside a small marble tomb on Armistice Day on November 11, 1921. To construct the Tomb of the Unknown Soldier (as it was then informally called), the pedestal for the memorial statue envisioned in Hastings' design was removed. Workers dug 20 feet (6.1 m) down into the earth behind the retaining wall. At this level, concrete footings 16 feet 2 inches (4.93 m) long by 9 feet 6 inches (2.90 m) wide were constructed. The earthen walls were reinforced with a burial vault consisting of concrete walls 7 feet (2.1 m) thick at the bottom, narrowing to just 2 feet 4 inches (0.71 m) thick at the top. A hollow rectangular plinth was constructed on top of the vault walls, above which was a slightly smaller hollow marble base. On top of the marble base was a rectangular capstone with curved sides, which was also pierced through the center. A 2-inch (5.1 cm) deep layer of soil brought from France along with the unknown soldier's body lined the bottom of the burial vault. After the unknown soldier was lowered into the vault and rested on the soil below, the capstone was sealed with a marble lid.

Additional changes to the east front came within just a few years. On July 3, 1926, Congress authorized the completion of the Tomb of the Unknown Soldier with an appropriate memorial. A design by architect Lorimer Rich and sculptor Thomas Hudson Jones was selected on December 10, 1928. The Lorimer/Hudson design, like nearly all the other submissions, anticipated removing the retaining wall below the tomb and building the monumental staircase first envisioned by Thomas Hastings. Congress agreed with this revision, and on February 28, 1929, authorized construction of the stairs, new road and pedestrian approaches, alterations to the formal gardens, and a new overlook. The Construction Division of the Quartermaster General's office oversaw the work, which was performed by the Hegman-Harris Company of New York City.

=== 1956 renovation and expansion of the tomb ===
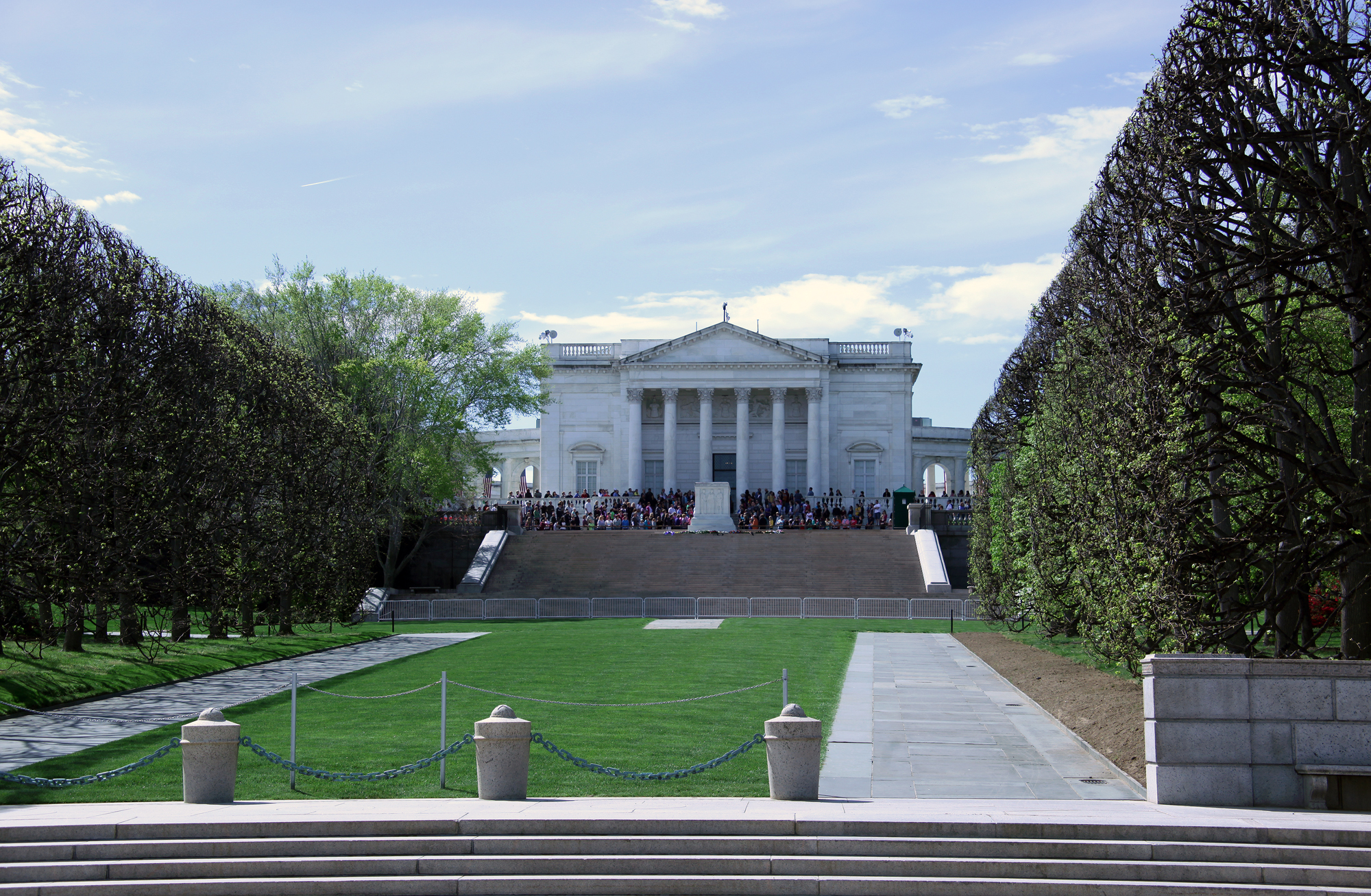
Looking west across the Italianate formal garden at Memorial Amphitheater. The monumental steps were constructed as part of the Tomb of the Unknown Soldier between 1929 and 1932, and the central roadway removed.

Little additional work was done at Memorial Amphitheater until 1954. By then, settling of the amphitheater and entrance hall, cracking of walls and exterior marble, water damage, and other serious problems were beginning to affect the structure. Congress appropriated $15,000 for fiscal 1954 (which began June 30, 1953) for a year-long study of the problems. A preliminary estimate indicated that repairs would cost $179,000. But the finished study identified even more serious issues, almost all of which were caused by design deficiencies which did not take into account the seasonal expansion and contraction of the building's marble. Arlington National Cemetery officials were forced to ask Congress for $447,000 to repair the amphitheater and $179,000 to repair the entrance building. Congress approved the request.

A second major change was made to the plaza in 1958. President Dwight Eisenhower signed legislation in August 1956 to allow the interment of unidentified remains for soldiers from World War II and the Korean War at the Tomb of the Unknowns. Two new burial vaults, to the northwest and southwest, were dug in the plaza before the eastern entrance hall. Carved into the granite in front of the tomb sarcophagus were the dates "1917-1918". The Korean War unknown was interred in the northwest vault beneath a slab with the dates "1950-1953" carved into its western edge. The World War II unknown was interred in the southwest vault beneath a slab with the dates "1941-1945" carved into its western edge. The cover slabs of both new vaults were flush with the plaza. The two unknowns were interred on Memorial Day on May 30, 1958.

In August, 1960, Congress abolished the Arlington Memorial Amphitheater Commission and transferred its duties to the Secretary of Defense. Although the commission had long ago fulfilled its basic mission of the construction of Memorial Amphitheater, it still had the legal authority to approve the placement of plaques, markers, and other commemorations on the inside, on the exterior, or on the grounds of the structure.

On May 24, 1964, Memorial Amphitheater was the site of a late-afternoon ceremony celebrating the 100th anniversary of the founding of Arlington National Cemetery. During its 50th year anniversary in 1969, the American Legion, along with the American Legion Auxiliary donated an exterior lighting system so that Memorial Amphitheater and the Tomb of the Unknowns could remain lit at night. In the midst of ceremonies also marking the 50th anniversary of the Paris Caucus – President Richard Nixon formally took possession of the lighting system in the nation’s name, flipping the switch that turned the lights on.

=== 1974 renovation ===
Additional physical plant problems appeared at Memorial Amphitheater in 1965. The retaining walls adjacent to the east plaza began cracking vertically, and extensive horizontal cracks and spalling were found on the Tomb of the Unknowns as well. Additional damage occurred over the next five years. Congress then appropriated $522,000 in fiscal year 1972 to repair these problems as well as provide yet another renovation of the exhibit hall. By this time, attendance at Arlington National Cemetery had soared with the construction of the John F. Kennedy Eternal Flame in 1967 and the addition of the grave of Robert F. Kennedy in 1971. To accommodate the much larger crowds wishing to see the Tomb of the Unknowns, Congress appropriated an additional $478,000 in fiscal 1972 to widen pedestrian walkway approaches to accommodate the larger crowds. To make Memorial Amphitheater more accessible for the disabled, steep slopes around the structure were eliminated and steps were replaced with ramps. Congress appropriated an additional $3 million in 1974, to bring the construction project's total to $4 million. The extra funds paid for widening of the steps and portico in front of the east entrance — increasing the number of people who could view the changing of the guard at the tomb to 800 individuals from 200. In addition, the tomb honor guard received new guard posts on the plaza in front of the amphitheater.

The mid-1970s widening of the Memorial Amphitheater portico, reconstruction of the pedestrian approaches, and repairs to the plaza around the Tomb of the Unknowns represented the first major construction at the site since 1920.

=== Dedications and adding memorials ===
An attempt to dedicate the chapel at Memorial Amphitheater occurred in 1977. The National Cemetery Act of 1973 required the Secretary of Defense to locate unidentified remains of a Vietnam War veteran, construct a vault for these remains at the Tomb of the Unknowns, and inter the remains there. The vault was constructed between the World War II and Korean War vaults on the plaza, and a marble slab with the word "VIETNAM" inscribed on it placed over the empty burial shaft. By 1977, many remains had been located, but all of them were subsequently identified. Vietnam veterans and their supporters, concerned that no unidentified remains would ever be located, pushed to have the chapel in Memorial Amphitheater dedicated to veterans who served in Southeast Asia from 1958 to 1975. Legislation to require the change was introduced in Congress, but most legislators felt that if the chapel were to be dedicated it should be to all veterans. The legislation did not pass, and the chapel remained nameless.

On Veterans Day in 1978, President Jimmy Carter dedicated a plaque inside the exhibit hall which honored Vietnam War veterans. Two temporary plaques in the exhibit hall were dedicated by Secretary of Defense Caspar Weinberger on Memorial Day in 1983. One plaque commemorated military personnel who died in the Vietnam War, and the second explained why no Vietnam War unknown had been interred at the Tomb of the Unknowns.

=== 1995–1996 renovations and controversy ===
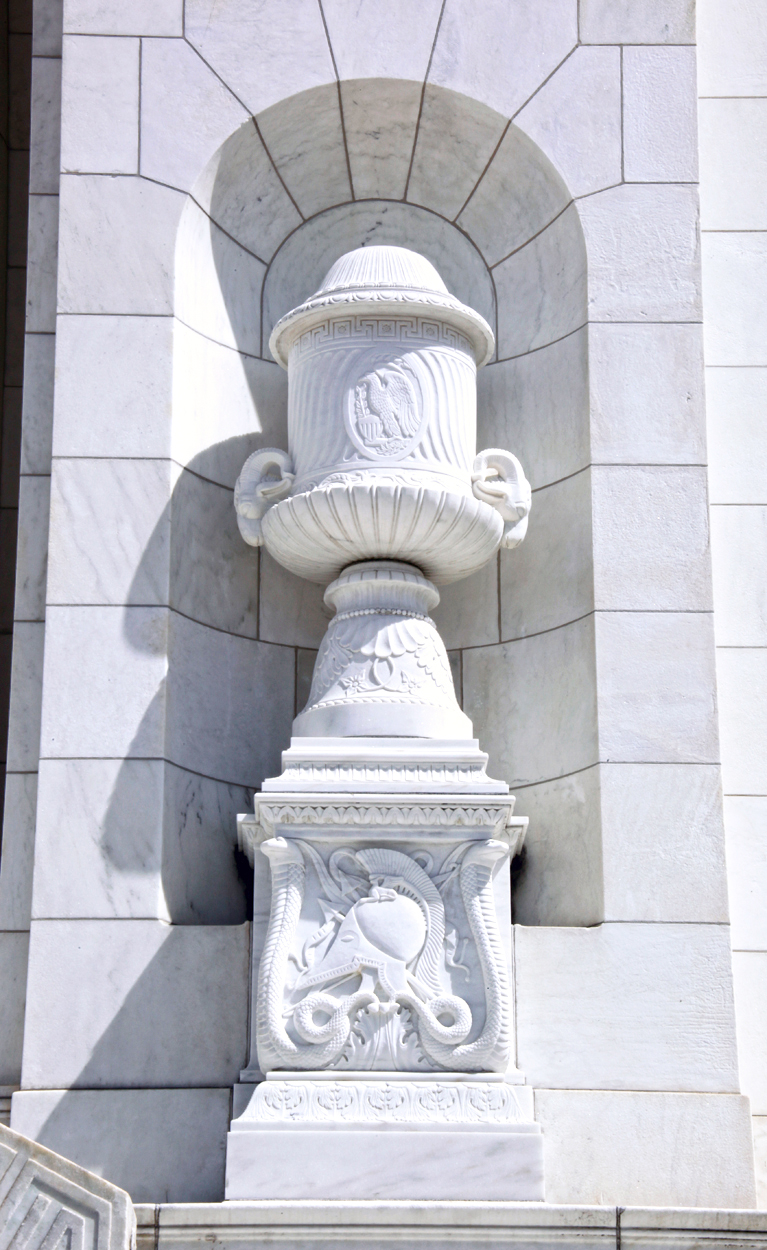
A replacement urn on the south side of the stage in Memorial Amphitheater. The original urns were removed in 1996 and made their way into private hands; they were returned in 2011.

Extensive additional renovations in the amphitheater were made in the mid-1990s. Congress appropriated $4.82 million in fiscal 1992 to repair rainwater damage and fix leaks, and an additional $4.5 million in fiscal 1993 to restore damaged marble. Although the project was planned for completion in July 1995, a six-month delay occurred because of protests regarding the way the contracts were awarded. Bids for the project came in much lower than anticipated, creating $2.7 million in savings. The Army used $34,405 to make whole the bidder who had protested the improper contract award. About $1.4 million of these savings were used to build new wheelchair access ramps and improve access to the amphitheater for handicapped or disabled individuals. The remaining $1.3 million were used to build a columbarium at the cemetery. The repairs included installation of new waterproof membranes; removing water and rust stains; patching and repainting cement, marble, and stone; replacement of all deteriorated marble sculptures, balusters, and benches; replacement of worn and rusted iron railings and drinking fountains; replacement of worn and broken flagstone walkways; and installation of new and upgraded signage and trash containers. These repairs and improvements were almost complete by the end of March 1996.

Clark Construction Group, which was the general contractor for these renovations, received an Excellence in Construction Award from the D.C./Virginia chapter of the Associated Builders and Contractors for the outstanding quality of its work.

Controversy about the renovation erupted in January 2011, however, when original decorative urns from the 1995–1996 renovation turned up at auction. The two 9-foot (2.7 m) tall urns, sculpted by Ulysses Ricci, formerly stood on either side of the stage in the amphitheater. By 1995, they had significantly weathered and many details had softened so much as to be unrecognizable. Omni Construction, one of Clark Construction's subcontractors, was assigned to dispose of the urns. Omni turned the urns over to Pagliaro Brothers Stone of Upper Marlboro, Maryland. Pagliaro Brothers Stone said they did not have records about the urns' ultimate fate, but in 1997 the urns ended up in the hands of an unidentified antiques dealer. The dealer sold them to DHS Designs, an antique shop in Queenstown, Maryland. The urns (priced at $125,000) never sold, and in 2010 the owner of DHS Designs closed his store and put the urns up for auction. Potomack Company, the Alexandria, Virginia, auction house assigned to handle the urns, advertised them in December 2010—which brought the urns to the attention of preservationists in the D.C. area. According to unnamed preservationist experts interviewed by The Washington Post, the historic urns should have been restored or placed in a museum—not donated to private owners for sale. The U.S. Army, which manages Arlington National Cemetery, said it could not find the 1995 renovation contract and was unable to say what provisions for the urns' disposal had been made nor whether federal property and preservation agencies had been consulted before the urns were replaced.

Within a week of press reports about the sale, Arlington National Cemetery officials said that Clark Construction had been instructed to preserve the urns. These instructions met the requirements of Virginia law, which forbade the discard of historic artifacts. Alerted to the sale by The Washington Post, the Army asked Potomack Company to postpone the sale pending investigation of ownership.

On January 24, 2011, DHS Designs returned the urns at no cost to Arlington National Cemetery. The Army did not say whether it would display the urns at the cemetery or move them to another Army museum.

=== 2012 renovation ===
In 1999, moisture damage to the ceiling in the Memorial Amphitheater chapel wore away a hole, which allowed water to begin dripping into the chapel.

The plaza of Memorial Amphitheater was altered once more in 1999. The unidentified remains of a Vietnam War servicemember were interred in the Vietnam War vault at the Tomb of the Unknowns on May 28, 1984. But questions were raised in 1994 that indicated the Army (under pressure from the Reagan administration to placate veterans' groups by finding a Vietnam War unknown) ignored evidence that the remains could be identified. After extensive media attention, the Vietnam War unknown was exhumed from the Tomb of the Unknowns on May 14, 1998. DNA testing revealed on June 30, 1998, that the remains were those of United States Air Force 1st Lieutenant Michael Blassie. On September 16, 1999, the marble slab over the now-empty burial vault was replaced by a new slab in a ceremony overseen by Secretary of Defense William Cohen. The new slab was inscribed with the words "Honoring and Keeping Faith with America's Missing Servicemen." Department of Defense officials decided to replace the old slab with a new one given how unlikely it was that unidentified Vietnam War remains would ever be found. Covering the vault to make it appear as if it did not exist was rejected.

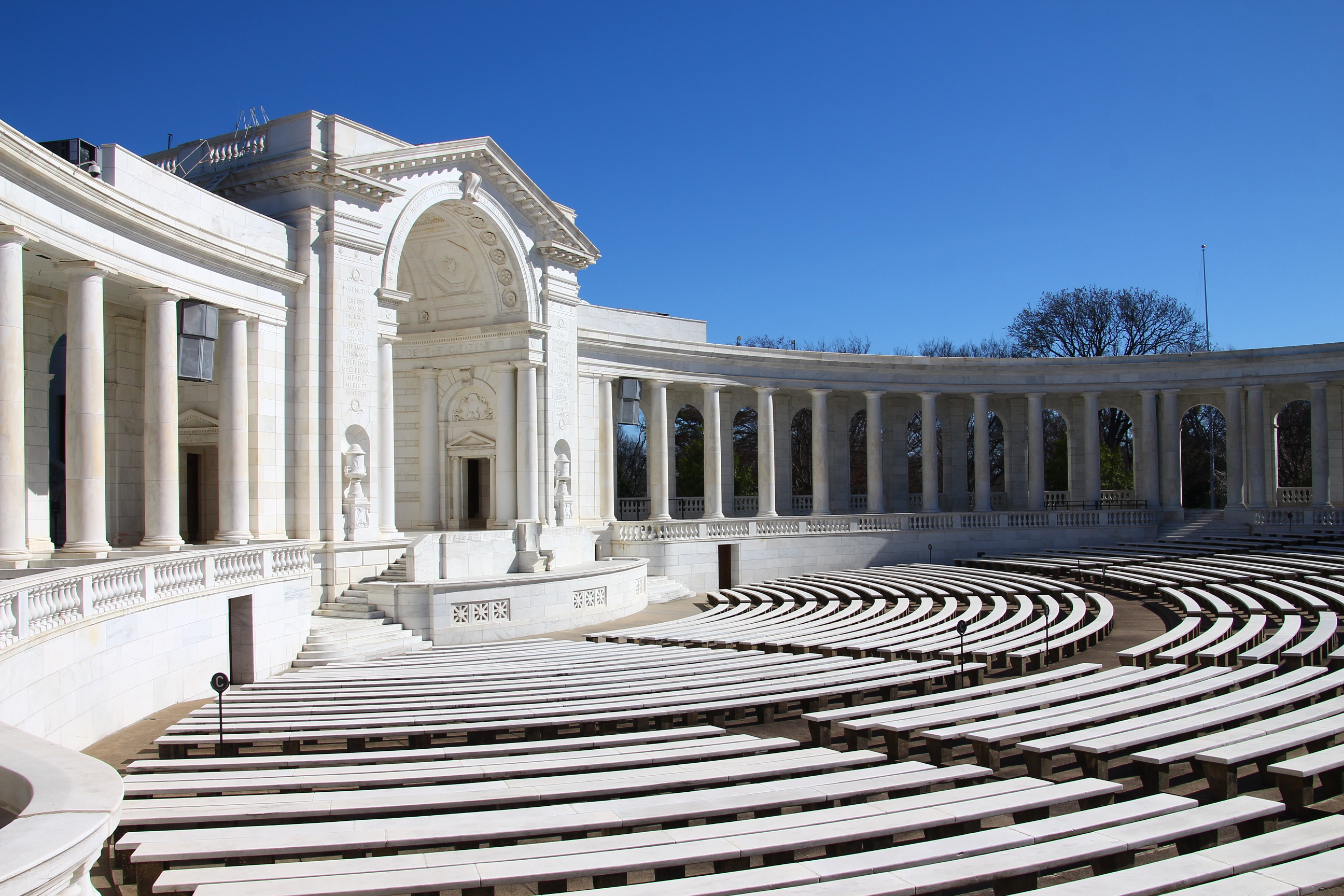
Arlington Memorial Amphitheater (March 2023)

By 2000, the east entrance hall at Memorial Amphitheater was suffering water damage and other problems yet again. Congress appropriated $800,000 in fiscal year 2001 to identify what fixes might be needed. Repairs were made in 2006, which included ameliorating water damage in the basement, first floor, and second floor; repairing and improving roof and exterior drainage; and installing new waterproofing and drains to prevent flooding in the basement women's restroom and chapel.

Additional repairs to the walkways around Memorial Amphitheater were made in 2012. In the wake of the Arlington National Cemetery mismanagement controversy of 2008-2011, Arlington National Cemetery officials discovered that more than $32.6 million in funds for cemetery improvements, maintenance, and operations had gone unspent. A portion of these funds were used to replace approximately 230,000 square feet (21,000 m^{2}) of the flagstone walkway around Memorial Amphitheater and to replace fire alarm systems in the east entrance hall.

== Famous funerals and services at the amphitheater ==
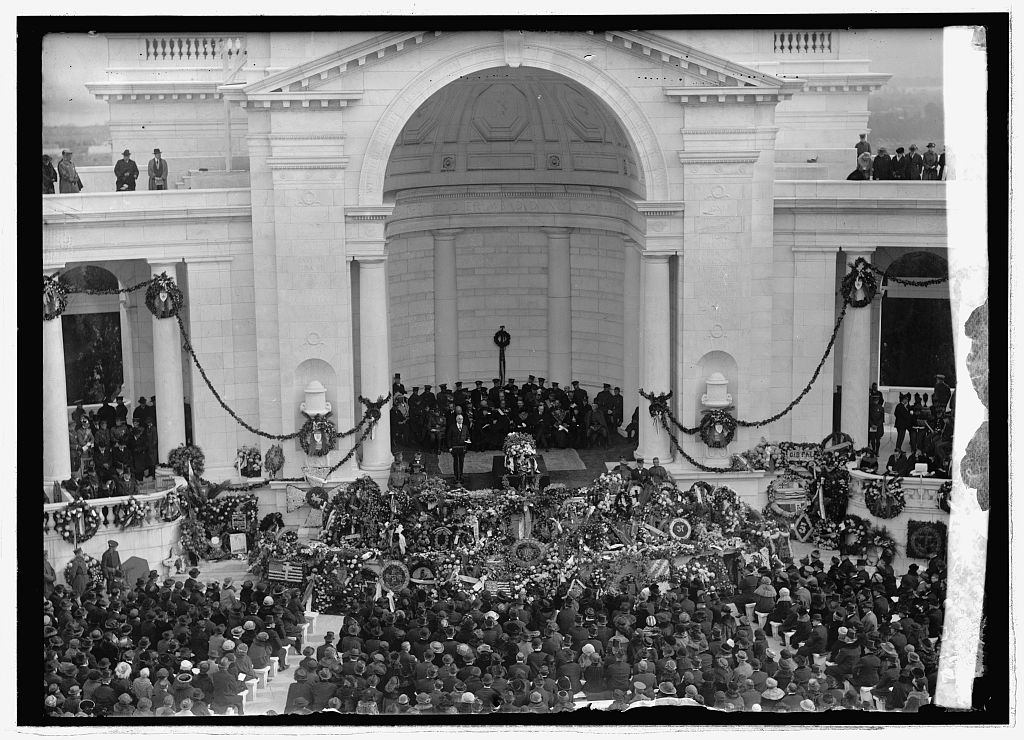
President Warren G. Harding (standing on stage, left of the casket) at the funeral of the Unknown Soldier of World War I (November 11, 1921)

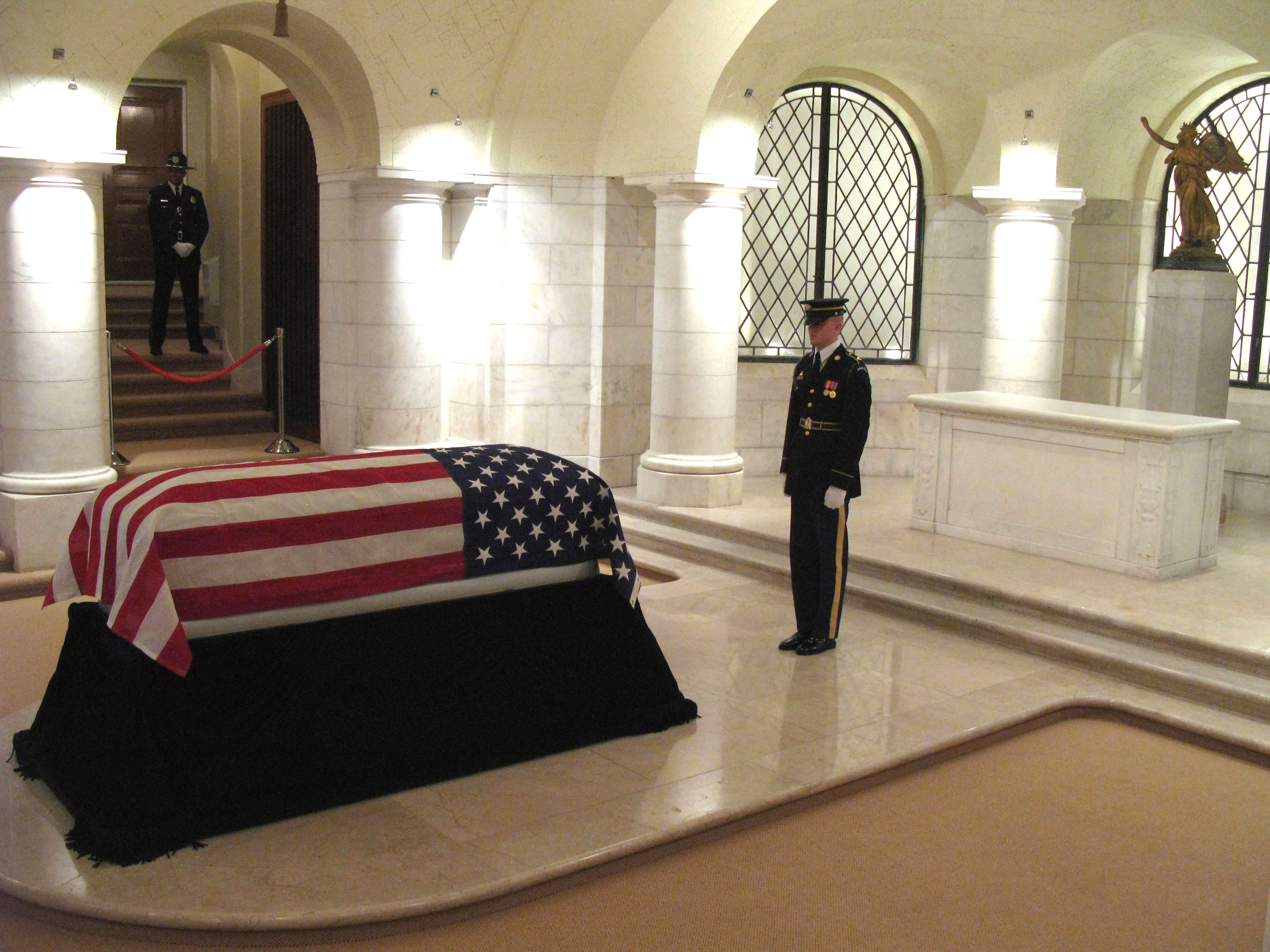
Frank Buckles, the last surviving American veteran of World War I, lies in state in 2011 in the chapel beneath the amphitheater.

Memorial Amphitheater has been the site of numerous Memorial Day and Veterans Day ceremonies. Every American President except Woodrow Wilson has visited the building since it was dedicated in 1921. Although the structure was dedicated during Wilson's presidency, he never visited Memorial Amphitheater or the Tomb of the Unknowns due to a massive stroke on October 2, 1919, from which he never recovered. He died on February 3, 1924. President Warren G. Harding was the first sitting president to visit Memorial Amphitheater, which he did on Memorial Day on May 30, 1921. President Harding was the first President to visit the Tomb of the Unknowns, as he was present during its dedication in November 1921. Harding was also the first president to speak in the Memorial Amphitheater before laying a wreath at the Tomb of the Unknowns, which he did on Memorial Day on May 30, 1923. Harding attended a service in the amphitheater on Memorial Day in May 1922, but did not speak or lay a wreath. He laid a wreath at the Tomb of the Unknowns on Veterans Day in November 1922, but did not speak in the amphitheater. On June 1, 1923, Colonel Charles Young (United States Army), The United States Military's first African American Colonel, became the fourth soldier honored with a funeral service at Arlington Memorial Amphitheater. He had died the previous year while serving as an attaché in Africa.

While memorial services in Memorial Amphitheater are common, the amphitheater has also hosted the funerals of many famous Americans. The first funeral to be held in the amphitheater was that of sculptor Moses Jacob Ezekiel, creator of the Confederate Memorial at Arlington National Cemetery, on March 30, 1921. Other funerals held in the amphitheater since then include those of General of the Armies John J. "Black Jack" Pershing, General of the Air Force Henry H. "Hap" Arnold, Secretary of Defense James Forrestal, and Antarctic explorer and Rear Admiral Richard E. Byrd. A funeral service for the unidentified remains of 30 victims of the September 11 attacks on The Pentagon was held at Memorial Amphitheater in 2002. It was the first time the amphitheater had held such a service since the interment of an unknown member of the armed forces representing Vietnam War dead in 1984.

Frank Buckles, the last American veteran of World War I, lay in state in the Memorial Amphitheater Chapel in 2011.

An Easter sunrise service has been held at Memorial Amphitheater every year since 1931. The first such service was held in 1931 and organized by the Knights Templar, a group of Freemasons. Music was provided by the United States Marine Band. President Herbert Hoover attended the service, along with several thousand people. Along with Memorial Day and Veterans Day ceremonies, it is one of the annual and most well-attended events in the amphitheater.

== See also ==
- List of contemporary amphitheatres

== Bibliography ==
- "The Arlington Memorial Amphitheater." Architectural Forum. January 1921, p. 91-96.
- Arlington Memorial Amphitheater Commission. Final Report of the Arlington Memorial Amphitheater Commission. Washington, D.C.: Government Printing Office, 1923.
- "Arlington Memorial Amphitheater, Deficiency." Document No. 1732. House Documents. Volume 116. U.S. House of Representatives. 65th Cong., 3rd sess. Washington, D.C.: U.S. Government Printing Office, 1919.
- Atkinson, Rick. Where Valor Rests: Arlington National Cemetery. Washington, D.C.: National Geographic Society, 2007.
- Baltimore District. Army Corps of Engineers. Annual Report of the Chief of Engineers on Civil Works Activities. Baltimore, Md.: U.S. Army Corps of Engineers, 1918.
- Baltimore District. Army Corps of Engineers. Annual Report of the Chief of Engineers on Civil Works Activities. Baltimore, Md.: U.S. Army Corps of Engineers, 1920.
- Butler, Sara A. and Wilson, Richard Guy. Buildings of Virginia: Tidewater and Piedmont. Oxford: Oxford University Press, 2002.
- Commission of Fine Arts. Tenth Report. Washington, D.C.: Government Printing Office, 1926.
- Condon, Kathryn A. Sustaining the Sacred Trust: An Update on Our National Cemeteries. Subcommittee on Disability Assistance and Memorial Affairs. Committee on Veterans' Affairs. U.S. House of Representatives. 113th Cong., 1st sess. Washington, D.C.: U.S. Government Printing Office, 2013.
- Corfield, Justin. "Arlington National Cemetery." In Encyclopedia of the Veteran in America. William Pencak, ed. Santa Barbara, Calif.: ABC-CLIO, 2009.
- Cultural Landscape Program. Arlington House: The Robert E. Lee Memorial Cultural Landscape Report. National Capital Region. National Park Service. U.S. Department of the Interior. Washington, D.C.: 2001.
- Dickon, Chris (2011). The Foreign Burial of American War Dead: A History. Jefferson, NC: McFarland & Co. ISBN 978-0786446124. OCLC 659753667.
- Dola, Steven. Departments of Veterans Affairs and Housing and Urban Development, and Independent Agencies Appropriations for 1995. Part 4. Subcommittee on Veterans Affairs and Housing and Urban Development and Other Independent Agencies. Committee on Appropriations. U.S. House of Representatives. 103d Cong., 2d sess. Washington, D.C.: U.S. Government Printing Office, 1994.
- Fodor's 2013 Washington, D.C. New York: Fodors Travel Publications, 2013.
- Lancaster, Martin H. Departments of Veterans Affairs and Housing and Urban Development, and Independent Agencies Appropriations for 1997. Subcommittee of the Committee on Appropriations. Committee on Appropriations. U.S. House of Representatives. 104th Cong., 2d sess. Washington, D.C.: U.S. Government Printing Office, 1996.
- Lemos, Kate; Morrison, William; Warren, Charles D.; and Hewitt, Mark Alan. Carrere & Hastings, Architects. Woodbridge, Suffolk, UK: Acanthus Press, 2006.
- Marter, Joan M., ed. The Grove Encyclopedia of American Art. New York: Oxford University Press, 2011.
- Metzler, John C. Veterans Cemeteries: Honoring Those Who Served. Subcommittee on Disability Assistance and Memorial Affairs. Committee on House Veterans Affairs. U.S. House of Representatives. 110th Cong., 1st sess. Washington, D.C.: U.S. Government Printing Office, 2007.
- Miglorie, Catherine. Vermont's Marble Industry. Mount Pleasant, S.C.: Arcadia Publishing, 2013.
- Mossman, Billy C. and Stark, M.W. The Last Salute: Civil and Military Funerals, 1921-1969. Washington, D.C.: Department of the Army, 1972.
- Peters, James Edward. Arlington National Cemetery, Shrine to America's Heroes. 2d ed. Bethesda, Md.: Woodbine House, 2000.
- Special Subcommittee on Cemeteries and Burial Benefits. Administration of Cemeteries: Availability of Cemetery Space for Burial of Eligible War Veterans, and Administration of Such Cemeteries. Committee on Veterans' Affairs. U.S. House of Representatives. 90th Cong., 2d sess. Washington, D.C.: U.S. Government Printing Office, 1968.
- Subcommittee of the Committee on Appropriations. Public Works for Water and Power Development and Atomic Energy Commission Appropriations for Fiscal Year 1972. Committee on Appropriations. U.S. Senate. 92d Cong., 1st sess. Washington, D.C.: U.S. Government Printing Office, 1971.
- Subcommittee on Cemeteries and Burial Benefits. Hearings on the National Cemetery System and Related Matters and on H.R. 7263, H.R. 11843, H.R. 10253, H.R. 11844, and H.R. 3863. Committee on Veterans' Affairs. U.S. House of Representatives. 95th Cong., 2d sess. Washington, D.C.: U.S. Government Printing Office, 1978.
- Subcommittee on Compensation, Pension, Insurance, and Memorial Affairs. Oversight of VA Cemetery System: Overseas Military Cemeteries and Memorials, Status of Site Selection Region IV National Cemetery, National Cemeteries Including Arlington National Cemetery. Committee on Veterans' Affairs. U.S. House of Representatives. 96th Cong., 1st sess. Washington, D.C.: U.S. Government Printing Office, 1979.
- War Department Annual Reports, 1915. Volume 2: Report of the Chief of Engineers. Washington, D.C.: Government Printing Office, 1915.
- War Department Annual Reports, 1916. Volume 3: Report of the Chief of Engineers. Washington, D.C.: Government Printing Office, 1916.
- War Department Annual Reports, 1917. Volume 3: Report of the Chief of Engineers. Washington, D.C.: Government Printing Office, 1917.
- War Department Annual Reports, 1918. Volume 3: Report of the Chief of Engineers. Washington, D.C.: Government Printing Office, 1918.
- War Department Annual Reports, 1919. Volume 2: Report of the Chief of Engineers. Washington, D.C.: Government Printing Office, 1919.
- Westphal, Joseph W. Departments of Veterans Affairs and Housing and Urban Development, and Independent Agencies Appropriations for 2001. Part 2. Subcommittee of the Committee on Appropriations. Committee on Appropriations. U.S. House of Representatives. 106th Cong., 2d sess. Washington, D.C.: U.S. Government Printing Office, 2000.
- Zirschky, John H. Departments of Veterans Affairs and Housing and Urban Development and Independent Agencies Appropriations for Fiscal Year 1996. Subcommittee of the Committee on Appropriations. Committee on Appropriations. U.S. Senate. 104th Cong., 1st sess. Washington, D.C.: U.S. Government Printing Office, 1995.
