= Attic base =

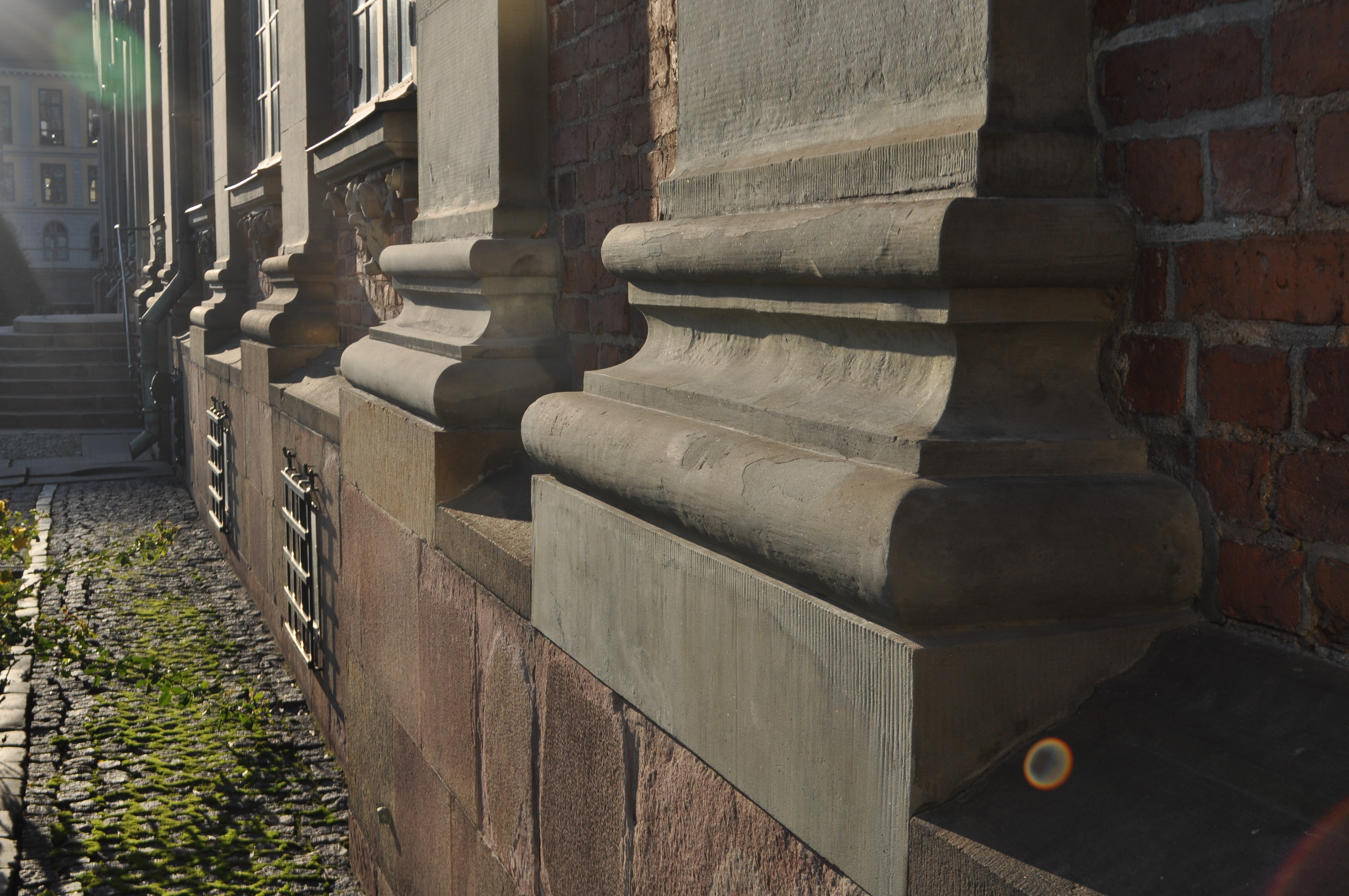
Detail of the Attic bases of the Corinthian pilasters at the Swedish House of Nobility in Stockholm

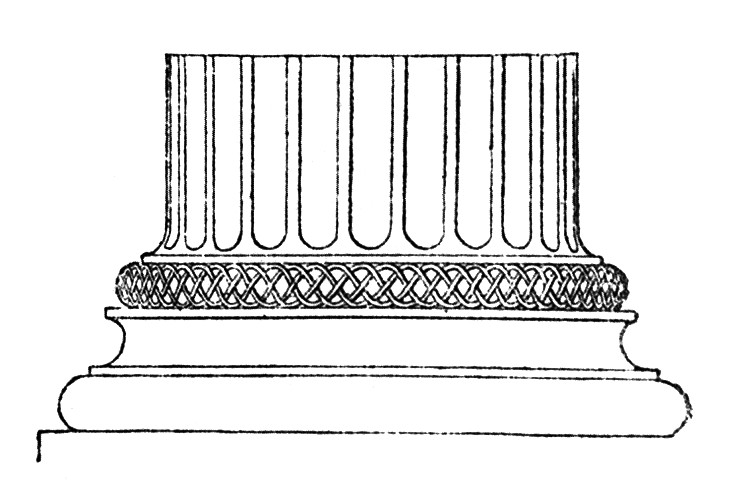
Drawing of an Attic base

Attic base is the term given in architecture to the base of Roman Ionic order columns, consisting of an upper and lower torus, separated by a scotia (hollow concave molding) and fillets.

It was the favorite of the Romans, and was also employed by them for columns of the Corinthian and Composite orders. The style can be seen in Byzantine architecture as well; in the Romanesque period a great number of antique Roman columns were salvaged and reused in the interiors and on the porticos of churches, often incorporating the Attic base.
