= Ivory Kimball =

American judge

Ivory George Kimball
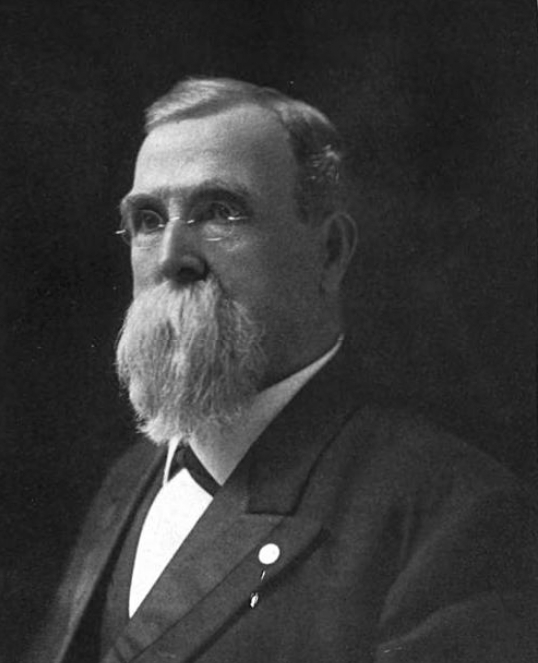
- Judge Ivory G. Kimball in 1909
- Born: May 5, 1843; Jay, Maine, U.S.
- Died: May 15, 1916 (aged 73); Washington, D.C., U.S.
- Occupations: Lawyer, judge

Ivory George Kimball (May 5, 1843 – May 15, 1916) was an American lawyer who served as a police court judge in Washington, D.C., for 19 years. He was also the primary advocate for the Arlington Memorial Amphitheater at Arlington National Cemetery in Arlington County, Virginia.

== Early life ==
Kimball was born on May 5, 1843, on a farm near Jay, Maine. His parents were Wilbraham Kimball, Jr. and Anna L. Kimball (née Hatch). His ancestor, Richard Kimball, emigrated from Ipswich, Suffolk, England, to Boston, Massachusetts, arriving in America on April 10, 1674. The Kimballs moved to Fort Wayne, Indiana, in June 1846. Ivory Kimball was educated in the city public schools, receiving a high school diploma at the age of 16. This qualified him to teach, which he did from 1860 to 1862.

Kimball enlisted as a private in Company E, 55th Indiana Volunteer Infantry, an infantry unit. He became seriously ill during his three-month enlistment, and his full recovery took nearly a year. He was denied readmission to the military. (The illness, dysentery with internal bleeding, recurred periodically throughout the rest of his life.) He relocated from Indiana to Washington, D.C., where he was employed by the United States Treasury Department. He received his law degree from Columbian College (now The George Washington University) in 1867 and entered the practice of law.

== Judgeship ==
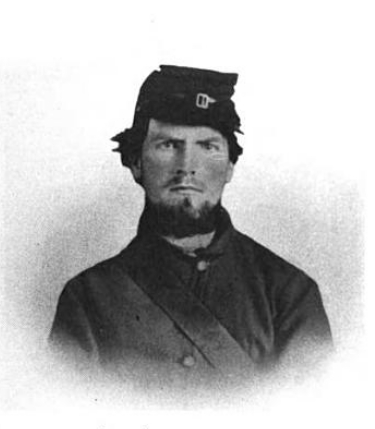
Ivory Kimball after enlisting in the Union Army in June 1862

In 1891, President Benjamin Harrison unexpectedly appointed Kimball to serve as a judge in the Police Court of the District of Columbia. He was sworn in on April 1, 1891. He fell seriously ill in October 1895 and was forced to temporarily leave the bench to recuperate.

Kimball was a candidate for reappointment to the bench in 1898. At first, President William McKinley—not happy with Kimball's irascibility in court—was expected to appoint another man to the position. But McKinley surprised court observers by reappointing Kimball on January 11, 1898, and he was quickly confirmed again by the United States Senate.

There was opposition to Kimball's renomination when his second term expired in 1904. Kimball was renominated for the bench by President Theodore Roosevelt. Local physician W.A. Croffut and others made complaints to the Senate about Kimball's ethics and behavior on the bench. An ad hoc subcommittee of the Senate Committee on the District of Columbia was formed to investigate the charges (which were not specified in a public way) in executive session. The executive hearings lasted several days in December 1903. At first the ad hoc subcommittee was hesitant to recommend Kimball for reappointment, but their doubts dissipated and Kimball was confirmed unanimously in executive session by the entire Senate on December 19.

During his third term in office, Kimball opposed a plan to put magistrates in police stations. He supported a successful 1904 proposal to have Congress fund construction of a new police court building, which was occupied in January 1907. He fell seriously ill again in late July 1905, and was forced to leave the bench for seven weeks. In 1906, Judge Kimball asked that the city attorney be permitted to dismiss any police charge which, in that officer's opinion, was not a prima facie case. His request for a change in the law was denied by the city commissioners. Kimball fell seriously ill again on December 17, 1907, and once more needed several weeks of rest to recover.

In 1908, Kimball was seriously injured while vacationing. He was traveling aboard a steamship to the West Indies and was struck by a door. He fell, and his leg and hip were injured. Kimball claimed he needed a cane to walk, and unsuccessfully sued for damages.

Kimball's third term expired in 1910. By this time, Kimball had made numerous enemies among attorneys in the city due to his behavior on the bench, and many of them suggested that he leave office (he was now 66 years old). He vigorously denied any intention of retiring. More than 112 local lawyers signed a petition asking President William Howard Taft to deny him reappointment on the basis of "temperamental unfitness" and incompetence. Taft hesitated on the appointment, and Kimball's term technically ended in January 1910. Still Taft made no appointment. Kimball, however, claimed he was still employed by the court, as he had a month's vacation due him which he had not taken. Kimball left on his 31-day vacation on February 18. According to The Washington Post, Kimball's term on the police court bench ended on April 2, 1910.

== Role in the GAR and in constructing Memorial Amphitheater ==
Kimball was a long-time and active member of the Grand Army of the Republic (GAR), an organization for veterans who had served in the Union army during the Civil War. In January 1902, Kimball ran for Commander of the Department of the Potomac, a highly influential chapter of the GAR. He won the position, and was installed on February 14, 1903. He served a single term, as usual for Commanders.

Kimball believed that not only should a new and larger amphitheater be built at Arlington National Cemetery, but also that the new amphitheater represent the dead of all wars in which the nation had fought. Kimball and the GAR began their push for a new amphitheater in 1903, and sketches for the amphitheater were drawn up in 1904 by Frederick D. Owen (a civilian engineer working for the United States Army Corps of Engineers). But legislation to construct an amphitheater failed to pass Congress in 1905 and again 1907. Legislation was enacted in 1908 authorizing the establishment of a commission to design an amphitheater, but it received only $5,000 in funding. Legislation to fully fund the commission and build an amphitheater was introduced in 1912 by Senator George Sutherland. Sutherland's bill proposed construction of the amphitheater Kimball wanted: a 5,000-seat structure with a small museum and an underground crypt (for the burial of famous individuals). This bill was successful. President Taft, in one of his last acts as president, signed the legislation into law on March 4, 1913.

The 1908 authorizing legislation established an Arlington Memorial Amphitheater Commission (AMAC) to oversee the design and construction of the structure. Its members included the Secretary of War, the Secretary of the Navy, the Superintendent of the U.S. Capitol, Judge Kimball (as a representative of the GAR), and Charles W. Newton (as a representative of the United Spanish War Veterans, a Spanish–American War veterans group).

Ground for Memorial Amphitheater was broken on March 1, 1915. President Woodrow Wilson laid its cornerstone in a ceremony on October 13, 1915. Kimball participated in the ground-breaking and cornerstone ceremonies, but did not live to see the amphitheater completed.

== Personal life ==
Kimball married Anna Lovinia Ferris, a fellow teacher he met while teaching public school in Indiana. They were married on September 26, 1865. The couple had seven children: Ella Clara (1866), Wilbra (1868), Harry Gilbert (1870), Alice May (1873), Arthur Herbert (1875), Bertha Louise (1878), Edna Gertrude (1879), and Walter Ferris (1873). The boy Wilbra suffered from epilepsy, and died at the age of 20.

Anna Kimball died on March 23, 1914.

== Death, burial and memberships ==
In retirement, Kimball was named president of Edmonston & Co., a boot manufacturing company.

Kimball fell ill in February 1916. He never regained his health. He became bedridden on May 12, and died suddenly at about noon on May 15. Funeral services were held at the Metropolitan Prebysterian Church, and he was buried in Arlington National Cemetery.

Kimball was a deeply religious man, as were many of his forebears. For many years, he sat on the board of directors of the Central Union Mission, an outreach center for the poor in Washington.

Kimball was also very active in Freemasonry. He was a 32d Degree Scottish Rite Mason, and was active in a number of lodges and branches of Masonry, including: Hiram Lodge No. 10, Free and Accepted Masons; Mount Vernon Chapter No. 3, Royal Arch Masonry; Washington Council No. 1, Royal and Select Masters; Columbia Commandery No. 2, Knights Templar; and Almas Temple, Ancient Arabic Order of the Nobles of the Mystic Shrine.

== Bibliography ==
- Arlington Memorial Amphitheater Commission. Final Report of the Arlington Memorial Amphitheater Commission. Washington, D.C.: Government Printing Office, 1923.
- War Department Annual Reports, 1915. Volume 2: Report of the Chief of Engineers. Washington, D.C.: Government Printing Office, 1915.
