= Michael Blassie =

United States Air Force officer killed in action (1948–1972)

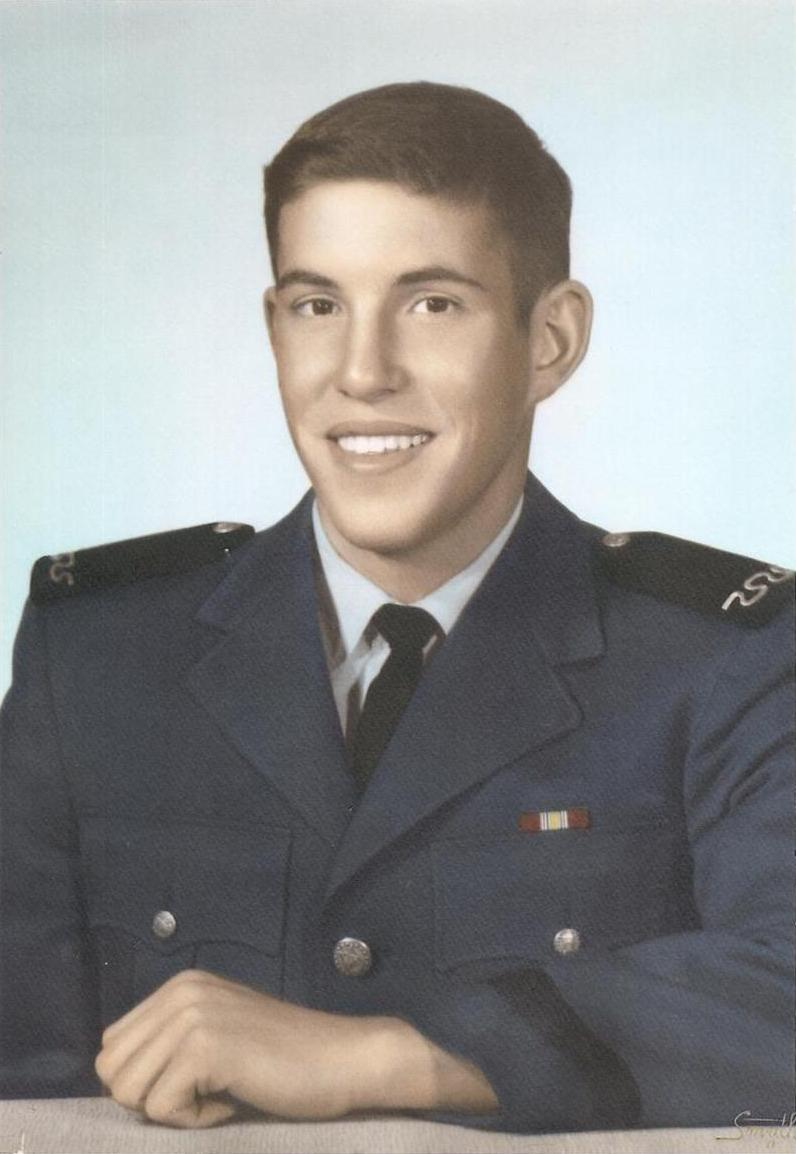
- Blassie in his Air Force Academy cadet uniform in 1966
- Born: Michael Joseph Blassie; April 4, 1948; St. Louis, Missouri, U.S.
- Died: May 11, 1972 (aged 24) near An Lộc, South Vietnam
- Burial place: Tomb of the Unknown Soldier (1984–1998); Jefferson Barracks National Cemetery (since 1998)
- Military career
- Allegiance: United States of America
- Branch: United States Air Force
- Service years: USAFA: 1966–1970; USAF: 1970–1972
- Rank: First lieutenant
- Conflicts: Vietnam War; Easter Offensive; Battle of An Loc †
- Awards: Silver Star; Distinguished Flying Cross; Purple Heart; Air Medal (5)

Michael Joseph Blassie (April 4, 1948 – May 11, 1972) was a United States Air Force officer who was killed in action during the Vietnam War in May 1972. Prior to the identification of his remains, Blassie was the unknown service member from the Vietnam War buried at the Tomb of the Unknown Soldier at Arlington National Cemetery. After his remains were identified by DNA testing in 1998, he was reburied at Jefferson Barracks National Cemetery in his native St. Louis County, Missouri.

== Biography ==
Blassie was born in St. Louis in 1948. After graduating from St. Louis University High School he entered the United States Air Force Academy, graduating in 1970. He then attended Undergraduate Pilot Training at Columbus Air Force Base, receiving his aeronautical rating as an Air Force pilot in 1971. He subsequently qualified as an A-37 Dragonfly pilot and served as a member of the 8th Special Operations Squadron, deployed to Southeast Asia. Blassie died when his A-37B Dragonfly was shot down near An Lộc in what was then South Vietnam.

== Awards and decorations ==

USAF pilot badge
Silver Star	Distinguished Flying Cross	Purple Heart
Air Medal with four bronze oak leaf clusters	National Defense Service Medal	Vietnam Service Medal with bronze campaign star
Air Force Longevity Service Award	Republic of Vietnam Gallantry Cross Unit Citation	Republic of Vietnam Campaign Medal

== Vietnam Unknown ==
Five months after the shoot down an Army of the Republic of Vietnam (ARVN) patrol inspected the crash site and retrieved partial skeletal remains, an ID card, dog tags, a wallet containing a family picture, part of a flight suit, and the remnant of a pistol holster. The ARVN turned the remains and the other crash site items over to Captain William C. Parnell, who was then serving as an operations officer at An Loc. The name he read on the ID card was Air Force Lt. Michael Blassie. Captain Parnell wrapped the remains, and the other items found at the crash site, in plastic and held them overnight.

Parnell soon turned the remains over to the Saigon mortuary, along with the ID card and other items. The remains were eventually sent to a search and recovery center in Thailand before being forwarded to the Army's central identification lab in Hawaii. They were initially identified by Mortuary Affairs as Blassie. The remains were reclassified as unknown when their projected age and height were judged not to match Blassie's.

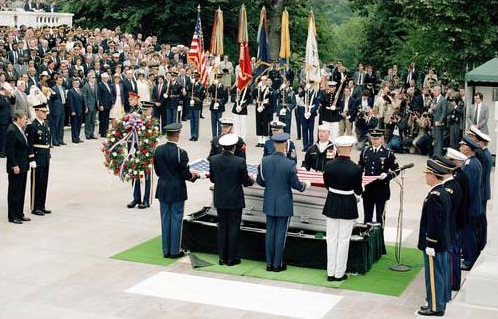
The Unknown Service Member from the Vietnam War – determined in 1998 to be 1st Lt. Michael Joseph Blassie – being buried on May 28, 1984

Blassie's unidentified remains were designated as the Vietnam Unknown service member by Medal of Honor recipient U.S. Marine Corps Sgt. Maj. Allan J. Kellogg Jr. during a ceremony at Pearl Harbor, Hawaii on May 17, 1984, and were transported aboard USS Brewton to Naval Air Station Alameda. The remains were then sent to Travis Air Force Base on May 24 and arrived at Andrews Air Force Base the following day.

Many Vietnam veterans, President Ronald Reagan and First Lady Nancy Reagan visited Blassie as he lay in state in the U.S. Capitol. An Army caisson carried his casket from the Capitol to the Memorial Amphitheater at Arlington National Cemetery on Memorial Day, May 28, 1984. President Reagan presided over the funeral and presented the Medal of Honor to the Vietnam Unknown. The President also acted as next of kin to the unidentified Blassie by accepting the interment flag at the end of the ceremony.

DNA identification had yet to advance to its current state when Blassie's remains were repatriated, and he lay in the Tomb of the Unknowns up to 1998, with visitors paying respects but unaware of his identity.

Articles in U.S. Veteran Dispatch in 1994 and 1996 had made the claim that Blassie was the Unknown, drawing on Defense Department records. A CBS News report in January 1998 subsequently made the same claim. They interviewed Parnell, by then a retired Colonel living in Florida. He related his story of wrapping the remains, with the dog tags, in plastic. After Blassie's family secured permission, the remains were exhumed on May 14, 1998. Based on mitochondrial DNA testing, Department of Defense scientists were able to identify Blassie's remains. On June 30, 1998, the Defense Department announced that the Vietnam Unknown had been identified. On July 10, Blassie's remains were transported to his family in St. Louis, and were later reinterred at Jefferson Barracks National Cemetery.

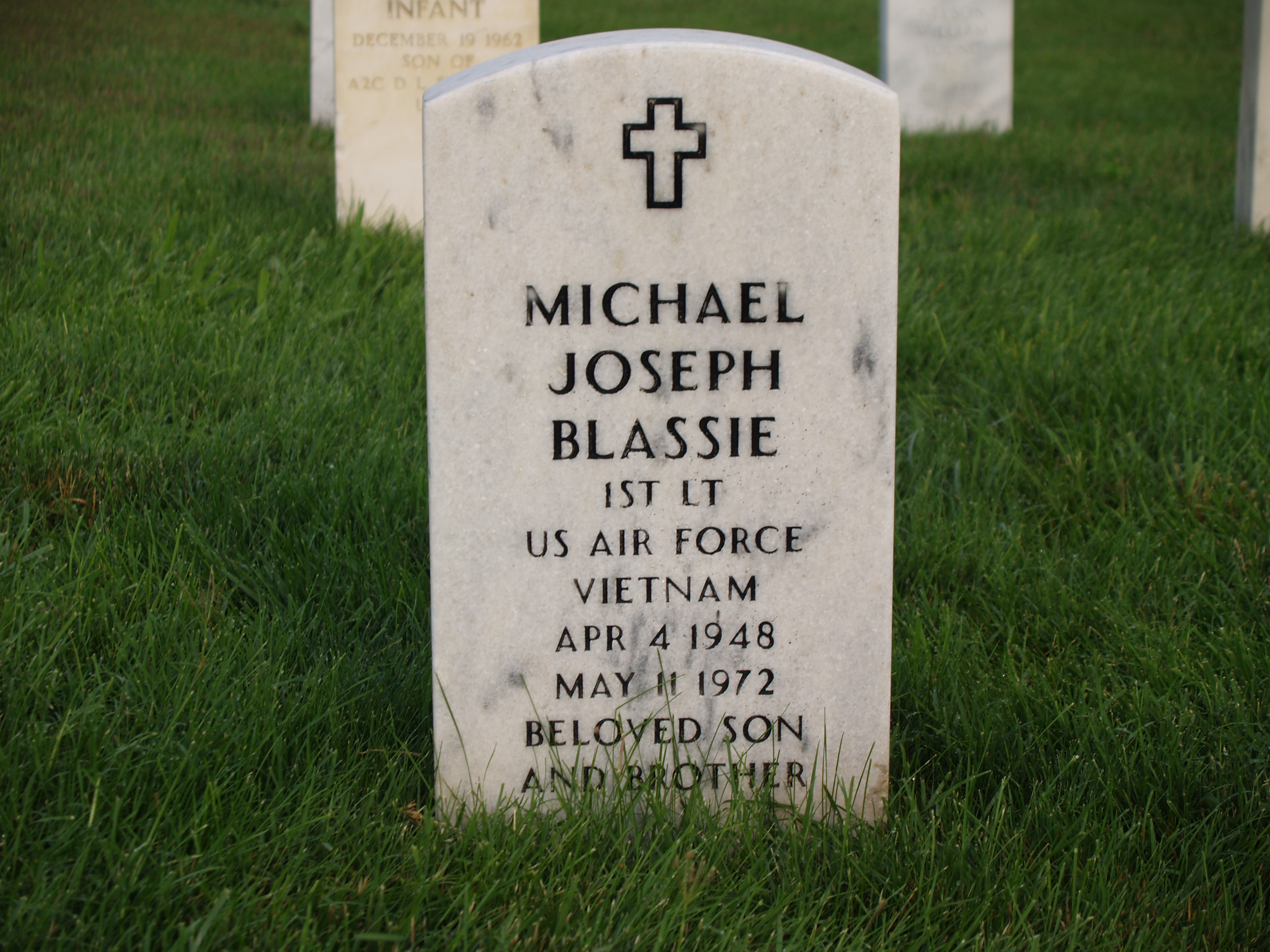
The grave site of Michael Blassie

Following the removal of Blassie's remains from the Tomb of the Unknowns, the slab marking "Vietnam" over the crypt that once held his remains was replaced with one that read "Honoring and Keeping Faith with America's Missing Servicemen", as it was decided that the Vietnam crypt would remain a vacant cenotaph.

As the Medal of Honor was ceremoniously presented to the unidentified remains as the Vietnam Unknown, it did not transfer to Blassie – who did receive four awards, including the Silver Star (see above), on his own merit for documented valor, heroism and achievements during his actions in combat in Vietnam.

== See also ==
- List of solved missing person cases

Honorary titles
Preceded by Hubert Humphrey	Persons who have lain in state or honor in the United States Capitol rotunda May 25, 1984 – May 28, 1984	Succeeded by Claude Pepper
