= United States Post Office (Kensington, Brooklyn) =

Historic post office in Brooklyn, New York

- US Post Office-Kensington
- U.S. National Register of Historic Places
- New York State Register of Historic Places
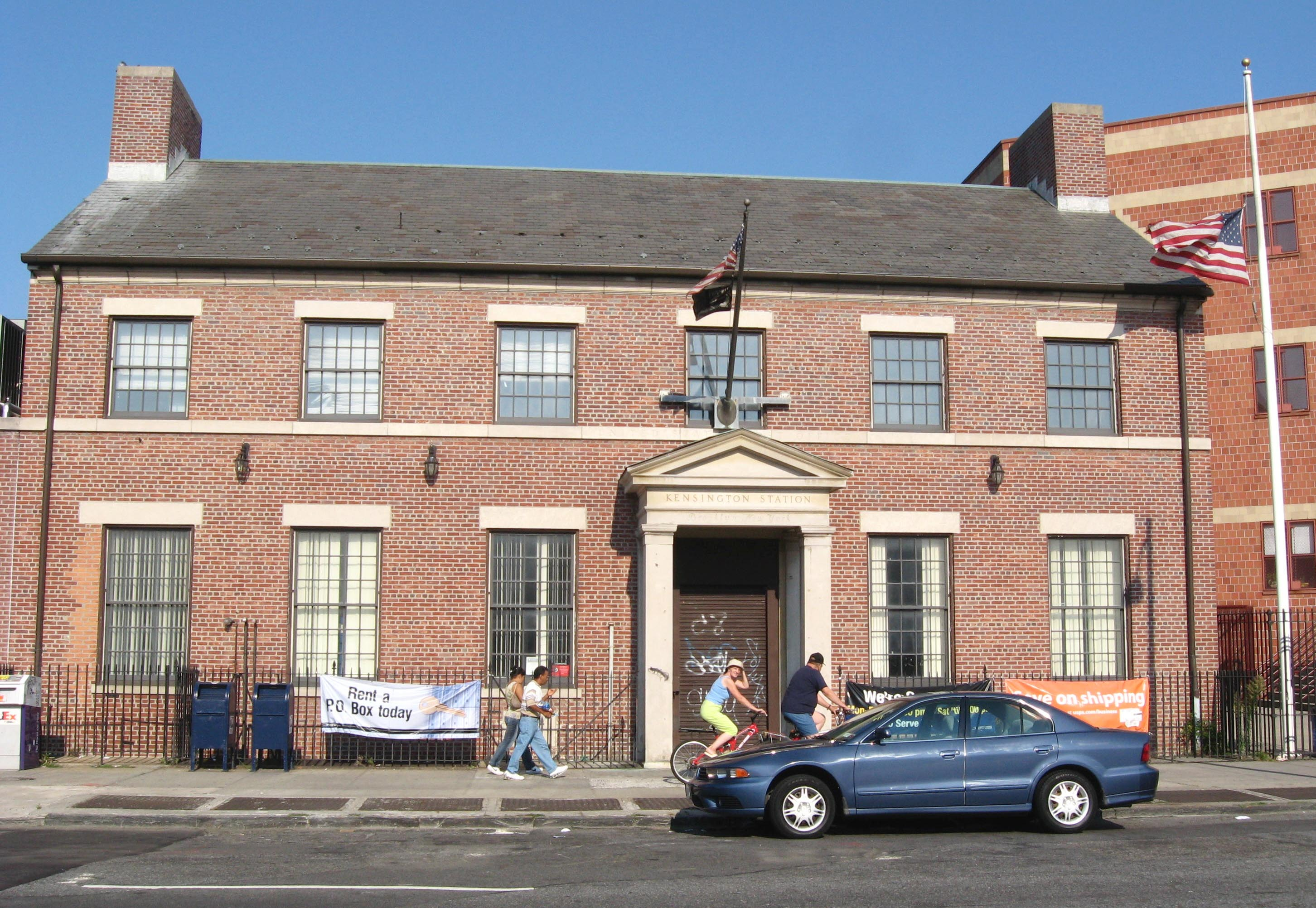
- U.S. Post Office, Kensington, August 2008

- Location within New York City Location within New York Location within the United States
- Location: 421 McDonald Ave., Kensington, Brooklyn
- Coordinates: 40°38′38″N 73°58′45″W
- Area: less than one acre
- Built: 1935
- Architects: U.S. Treasury Dept.; Rich, Lorimer
- Architectural style: Colonial Revival
- MPS: US Post Offices in New York State, 1858-1943, TR
- NRHP reference No.: 88002461
- NYSRHP No.: 04701.002505

Significant dates
- Added to NRHP: November 17, 1988
- Designated NYSRHP: November 17, 1988

US Post Office-Kensington is a historic post office building located at Kensington in Brooklyn, New York, United States. It was built in 1935, and designed by consulting architect Lorimer Rich for the Office of the Supervising Architect. The building is a two-story, six bay wide brick building in the Colonial Revival style. For much of its history it was painted white. It features a projecting pedimented wooden portico supported on Doric order piers.

It was listed on the National Register of Historic Places in 1988.
