= Tomb of the Unknown Soldier (Arlington National Cemetery) =

Monument in Arlington, Virginia, U.S.

- United States
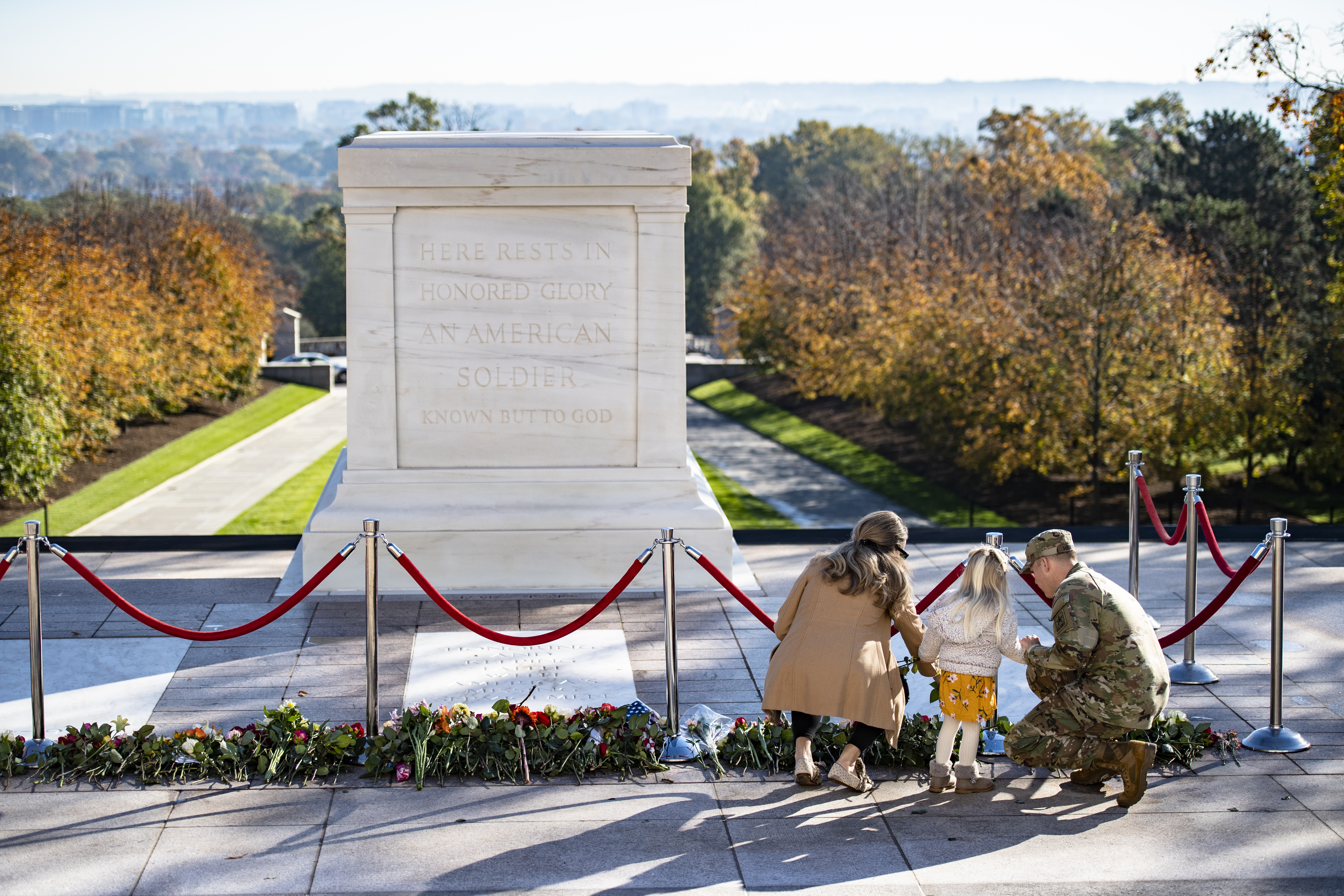
- Visitors offer floral tributes at the Tomb of the Unknown Soldier during its centennial commemoration in 2021
- For deceased U.S. service members whose remains have not been identified
- Unveiled: 11 November 1921; 105 years ago
- Location: 38°52′35″N 77°04′20″W; Arlington National Cemetery in Virginia
- HERE RESTS IN; HONORED GLORY; AN AMERICAN; SOLDIER; KNOWN BUT TO GOD

The Tomb of the Unknown Soldier at Arlington National Cemetery in Arlington County, Virginia, United States, was originally the burial site of a World War I soldier whose remains were unidentifiable. Following World War II and, subsequently, the Korean War, two more unknown soldiers were buried beneath two slabs, situated between the tomb and the Memorial Amphitheater behind it. A Vietnam War unknown soldier was also co-located there, but his remains were later identified and he was exhumed and returned to his family.

Other nations also have national burial sites for unknowns from the First World War (also known as the Great War), such as the United Kingdom, France, Canada, Portugal, Serbia, New Zealand and Italy. The Tomb of the Unknown Warrior is in the United Kingdom and the Tomb of the Unknown Soldier is in France. Nations have presented their highest awards or medals to each other's unknown soldier.

The World War I "Unknown" is a recipient of the Medal of Honor, the Victoria Cross, and several other foreign nations' highest service awards. The U.S. Unknowns from World War II and Korea have also received the Medal of Honor.

The Tomb is guarded around the clock by a Tomb Guard from the U.S. Army's 3rd Infantry Regiment, "The Old Guard". An elaborate ceremony, the Changing of the Guard, takes place every half-hour from April through September and hourly from October through March.

== Tomb of 1921 ==
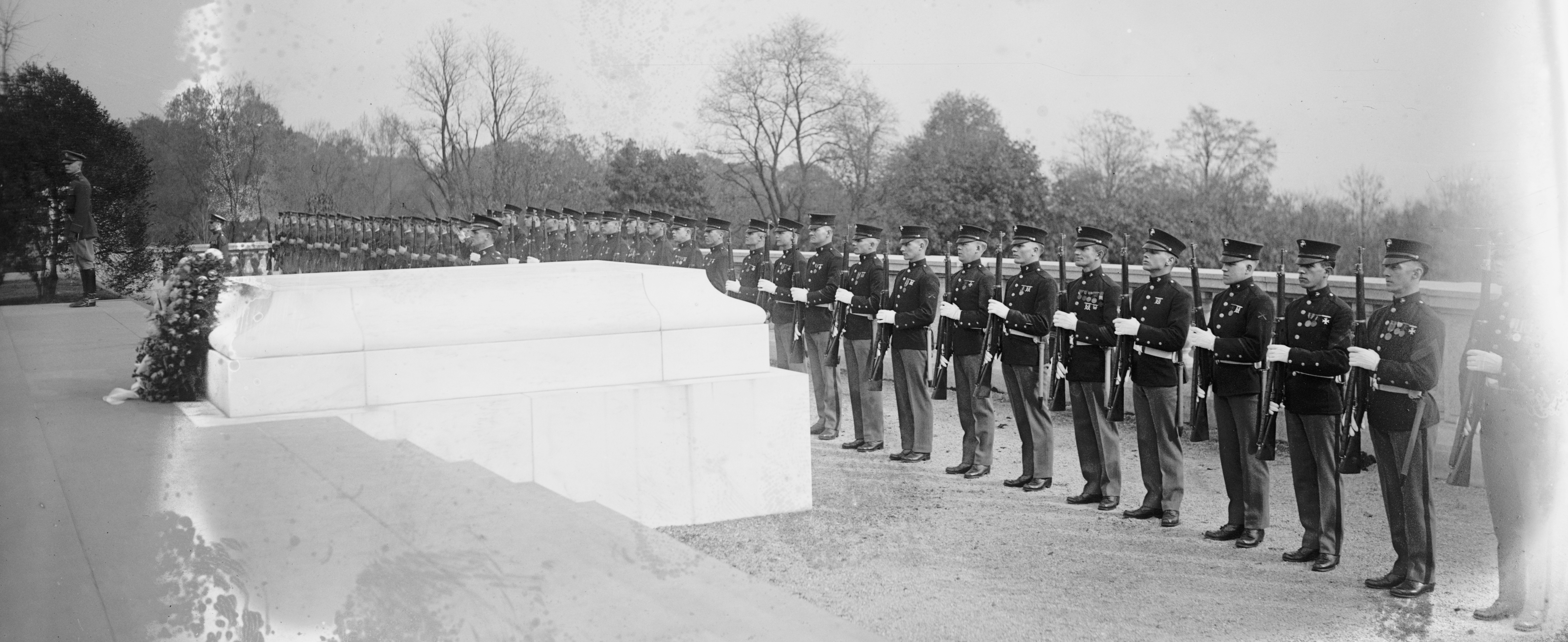
Tomb as of 11 November 1922. The Tomb of 1931 would occupy this same location.

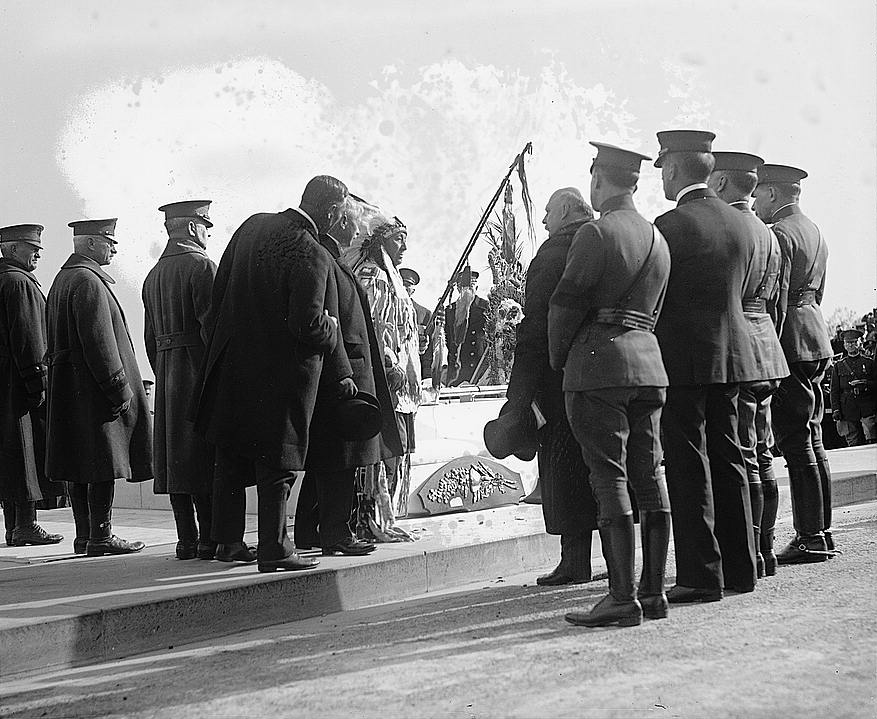
Part of the delegation at the Tomb in 1921, alongside Crow Nation chief Alaxchíia Ahú ("Plenty Coups")

On 4 March 1921, the United States Congress approved the burial of an unidentified American serviceman from World War I in the plaza of the new Memorial Amphitheater. On 11 November 1921, the unknown soldier brought back from France was interred below a three-level marble tomb. The bottom two levels are six granite sections each and the top at least nine blocks with a rectangular opening in the center of each level through which the unknown remains were placed through the tomb and into the ground below. A stone slab, rather than marble, covers the rectangular opening.

== Tomb of 1931 ==
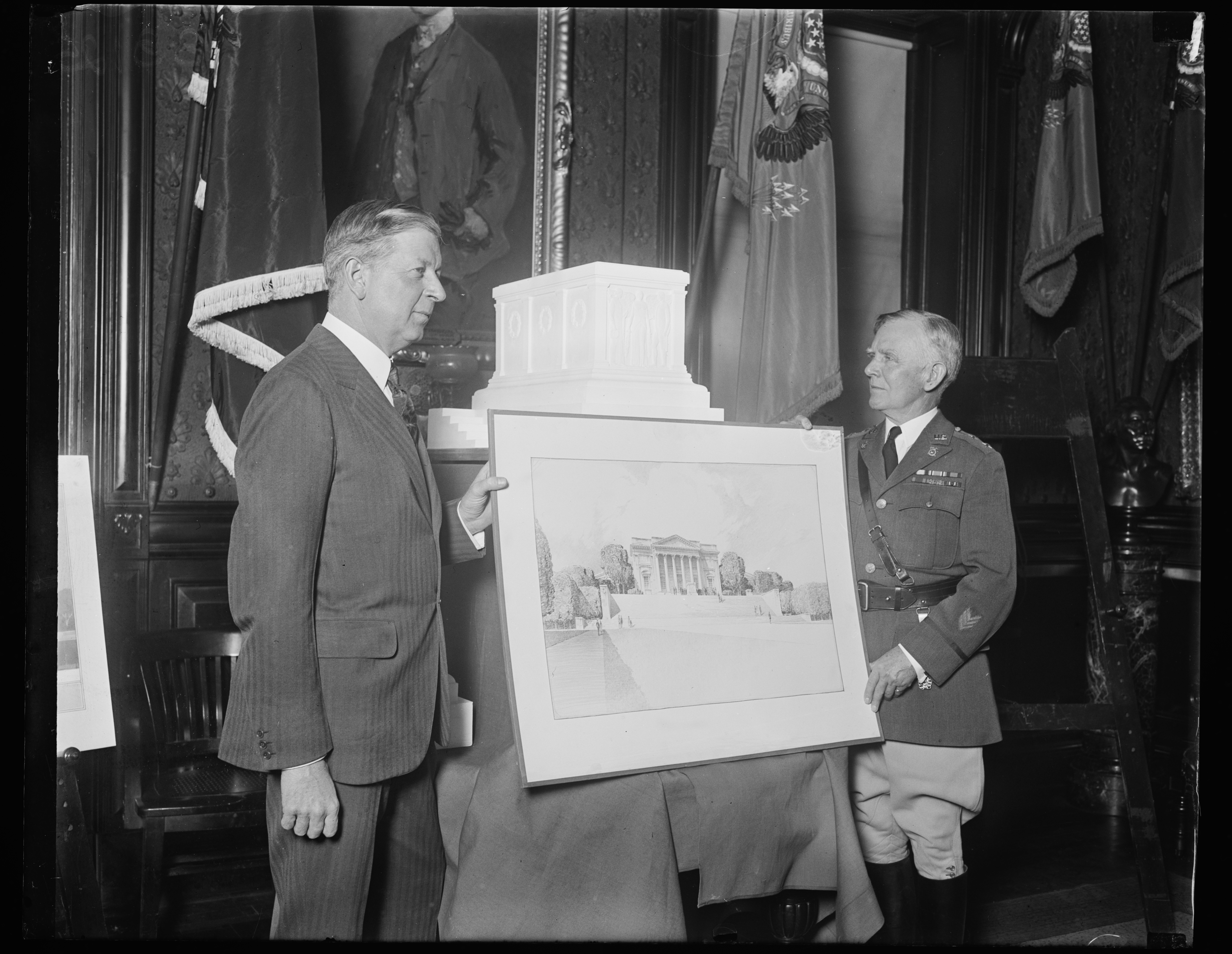
Secretary of War Dwight F. Davis (left) and Major General B. F. Cheatham, Quartermaster General of the U.S. Army, inspect the accepted model and design for the completion of the Tomb of the Unknown Soldier (1928). The design by sculptor Thomas Hudson Jones and architect Lorimer Rich was selected after a competition in which 73 designs were submitted.

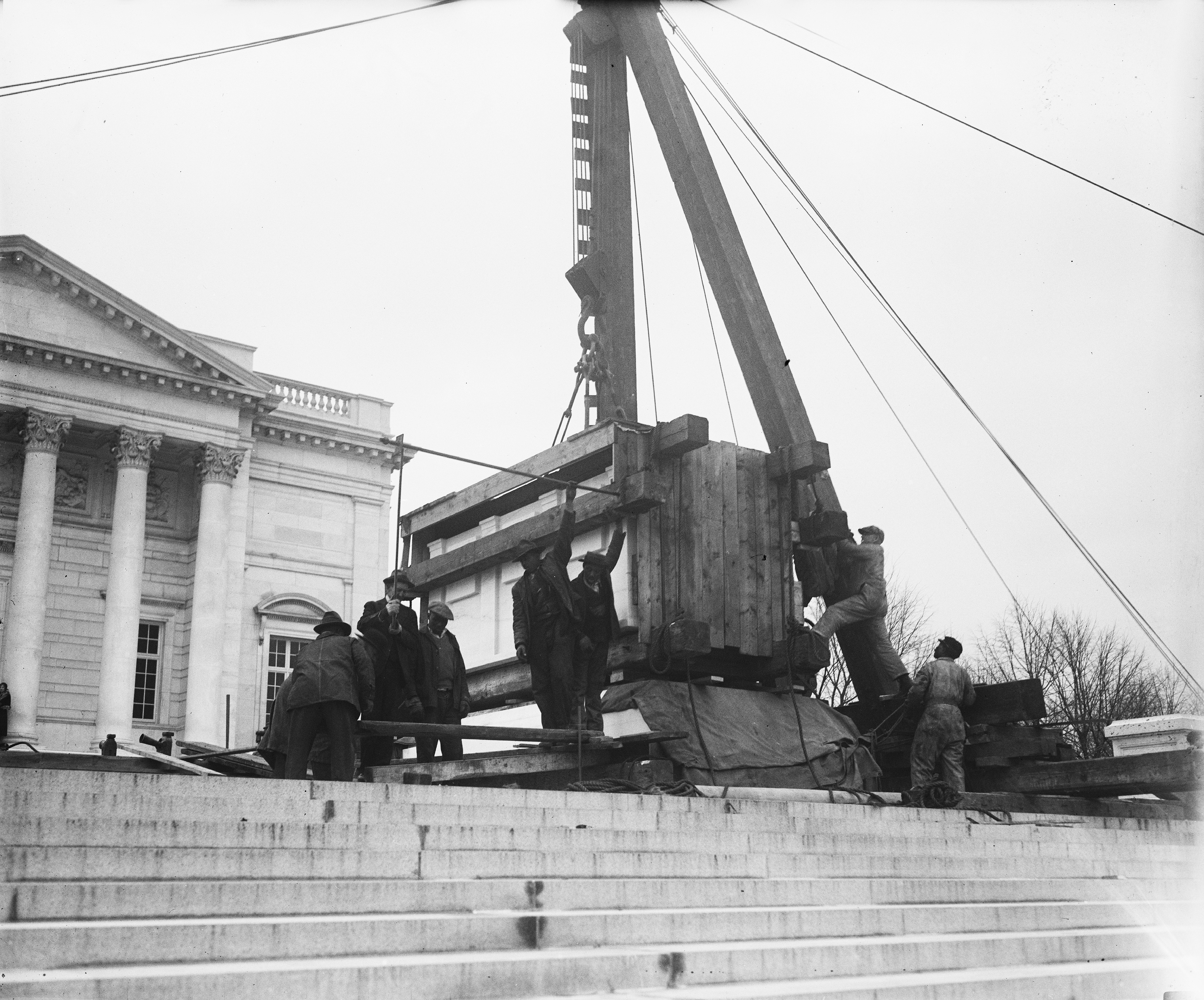
Placing the marble sarcophagus on top of the Tomb (1931)

Since 1921, the intent was to place a superstructure on top of the Tomb, but it was not until 3 July 1926, that Congress authorized the completion of the Tomb and the expenditure of $50,000, (equivalent to $727,000 in 2025). The completed cost was $48,000. A design competition was held and won by architect Lorimer Rich (Note: Syracuse University Archives has an extensive collection of Lorimer Rich (1914 Syracuse graduate) papers pertaining to his architectural design work of the Tomb, including 44 numbered drawings of the Tomb. http://archives.syr.edu/collections/alumni/rich_box.html) and sculptor Thomas Hudson Jones. An appropriation from Congress for the work was secured, and on 21 December 1929, a contract for completion of the Tomb itself was entered into. The Tomb would consist of seven pieces of marble in four levels (cap, die, base and sub-base) of which the die is the largest block with the sculpting on all four sides.

Quarrying the Yule marble (3.9 miles south of Marble, Colorado by the Vermont Marble Company) was a one-year process beginning in 1930. The cap was quarried on the first attempt but the base required three tries. The large middle block also required three tries. In late January 1931, the 56-ton middle block was lifted out of the quarry. The quarrying involved 75 men. When the block was separated from the mountain inside the quarry it weighed 124 tons. A wire saw was then brought into the quarry to cut the block down to 56 tons.

On 3 February 1931, the block reached the marble mill site (in the town of Marble) after a four-day trip from the quarry. There it was crated, then shipped to Vermont on 8 February. The block was sawed to final size in West Rutland, Vermont, and fabricated by craftsmen in Proctor, Vermont, before it was shipped by train to Arlington National Cemetery, Virginia. By September, all seven blocks were on the grounds of the Tomb site, at Arlington.

Assembly began in September 1931. An imperfection was found in the base, requiring three more quarryings. By the end of December 1931, the assembly was completed. Finishing work followed, with the carvings on the die block by the Piccirilli Brothers under the direction of sculptor Thomas Jones. (The brothers also carved the Lincoln statue for the Lincoln Memorial, among others). The Tomb was completed without formal ceremony on 9 April 1932.

The Tomb (Note: Many sources reference the 1931 Tomb as a sarcophagus, but it is not: in a sarcophagus, the remains are placed in a hollowed-out portion of the stone; the marble in the Tomb was not hollowed out and the remains are underneath the Tomb.) was placed at the head of the grave of the World War I Unknown. West of this grave are the crypts of Unknowns from World War II (south) and Korea (north). Between the two lies a crypt that once contained an Unknown from Vietnam (middle). His remains were positively identified in 1998 through DNA testing as First Lieutenant Michael Blassie, United States Air Force, and were removed. Those three graves are marked with white marble slabs flush with the plaza.

The Tomb has a flat-faced form and is relieved at the corners and along the sides by neo-classical pilasters set into the surface with objects and inscriptions carved into the sides. The 1931 symbolism of the objects on the north, south, and east sides changed over time.

North and South panel with 3 wreaths on each side represent (in 1931) "a world of memories" but later the six major battles engaged in by American forces in France: Ardennes, Belleau Wood, Château-Thierry, Meuse-Argonne, Oisiu-Eiseu, and Somme. Each wreath has 38 leaves and 12 berries.

East panel that faces Washington, DC, are three Greek figures representing Peace, Victory, and "American Manhood" – but later "Valor" instead of "American Manhood"

West panel is inscribed with (centered on the panel):

HERE RESTS IN
HONORED GLORY
AN AMERICAN
SOLDIER
KNOWN BUT TO GOD

Tomb Dimensions (Note: 1931 body block tonnage calculated in 2004 is different (by 5.9%) from the other source amount of 56 tons and can not be explained with certainty. Sub-base cubic footage and tons were calculated from the source dimensions because cubic feet and tons were not included in the source data table. Per cubic foot, the marble weighs 170 pounds.) as of 2004

Level	Length	Width	Height	Volume	Weight
Cap	12 ft 5.4 in	6 ft 6.7 in	1 ft 3.3 in	100.69 ft^{3}	8.56 tons
Die	12 ft 3.0 in	6 ft 6.4 in	5 ft 2.1 in	385.43 ft^{3}	32.76 tons
Die at Quarry	14 ft 0 in	7 ft 4.8 in	6 ft 0 in	621.6 ft^{3}	52.84 tons
Base	13 ft 10.0 in	7 ft 11.9 in	1 ft 11.1 in	198.64 ft^{3}	16.88 tons
Sub-Base	14 ft 10.4 in	9 ft 0.2 in	1 ft 10.9 in	255.81 ft^{3}	21.74 tons

== The Unknown of World War I ==
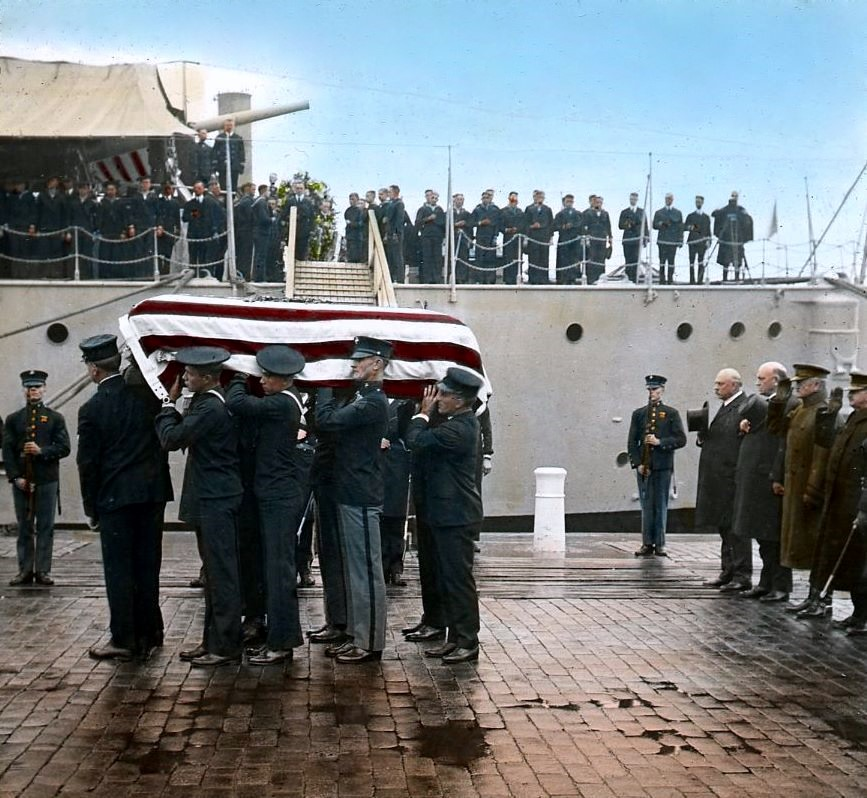
The World War I Unknown arriving at the Washington Navy Yard, 1921 (colorized)

On Memorial Day, 1921, four unknown servicemen were exhumed from four World War I American cemeteries in France, Aisne-Marne, Meuse-Argonne, Somme, and St. Mihiel. U.S. Army Sgt. Edward F. Younger, who was wounded in combat, highly decorated for valor and received the Distinguished Service Cross, selected the Unknown of World War I from four identical caskets at the city hall in Châlons-en-Champagne, France, on 24 October 1921. Younger selected the World War I Unknown by placing a spray of white roses on one of the caskets. He chose the second casket from the right. The chosen Unknown was transported to the United States aboard USS Olympia. Those remaining were interred in the Meuse Argonne Cemetery, France.

The World War I Unknown lay in state in the Capitol Rotunda from his arrival in the United States until Armistice Day 1921. On 11 November 1921, President Warren G. Harding officiated at the interment ceremonies at the Memorial Amphitheater at Arlington National Cemetery. During the ceremony, the World War I Unknown was awarded the Victoria Cross by Admiral of the Fleet Lord Beatty, on behalf of King George V of the United Kingdom. The United Kingdom Victoria Cross was placed with the soldier. Other Allied nations also awarded the American Unknown Soldier with decorations, including the Legion of Honour, Médaille Militaire, and Croix de Guerre from France, the War Cross from Czechoslovakia, the Gold Medal for Bravery from Italy, the Virtuti Militari from Poland, and the Virtutea Militara from Romania.

Earlier, on 17 October 1921, the British Unknown Warrior had been conferred the U.S. Medal of Honor by General of the Armies John Pershing.

== The Unknowns of World War II and Korea ==
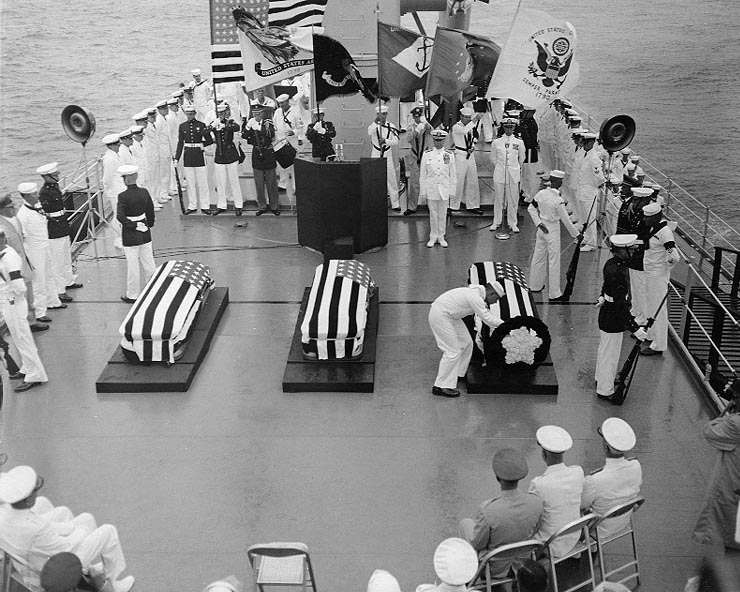
William Charette selects a coffin for burial in the World War II Tomb of the Unknown from the two coffins representing World War II (Pacific and European theaters) resting on each side of the Korean unknown [center] during ceremonies on board the USS Canberra, 26 May 1958.

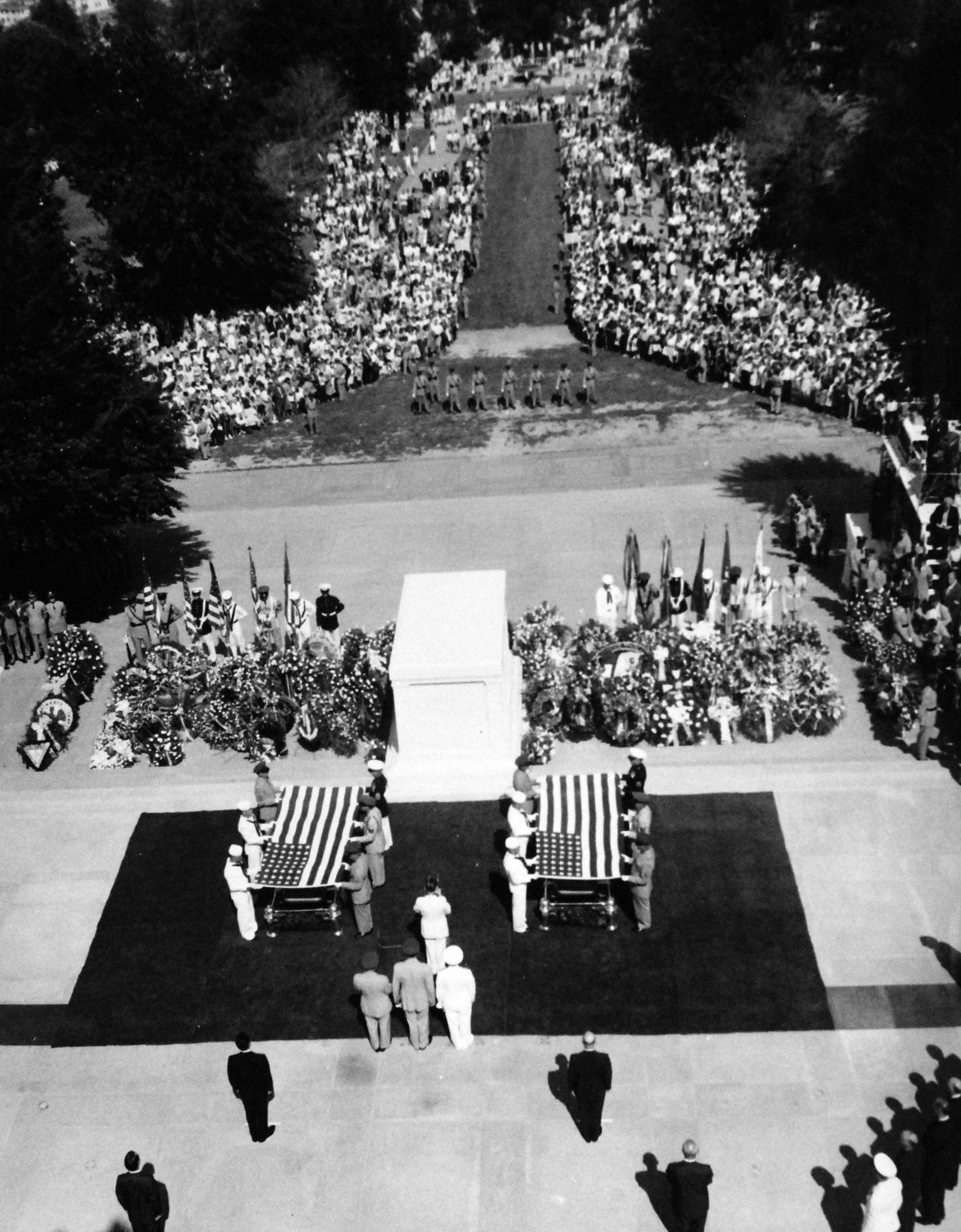
Last rites for the Unknowns of World War II and the Korean War at Arlington National Cemetery (30 May 1958)

On 3 August 1956, President Dwight D. Eisenhower, who served as a general during World War II, signed a bill to select and pay tribute to the Unknowns of World War II and the Korean War. The selection ceremonies and the interment of these Unknowns took place in 1958. The World War II Unknown was selected from remains exhumed from cemeteries in Europe, Africa, Hawaii, and the Philippines.

Two Unknowns from World War II, one from the European Theater and one from the Pacific Theater, were placed in identical caskets and taken aboard USS Canberra and placed on either side of the Korean unknown. Navy Hospital Corpsman 1st Class William R. Charette, then the U.S. Navy's only active-duty Medal of Honor recipient who was an enlisted man, selected the right-hand casket as the World War II Unknown. The casket of the remaining WWII unknown received a burial at sea.

The Korean unknown had been selected from four unknown Americans who died in the Korean War that were disinterred from the National Cemetery of the Pacific in Hawaii. Army Master Sergeant Ned Lyle made the final selection. The unselected unknowns were re-interred there.

The caskets of the WWII and Korean unknowns arrived in Washington on 28 May 1958, where they lay in the Capitol Rotunda until the morning of 30 May, when they were carried on caissons to Arlington National Cemetery. President Eisenhower awarded each the Medal of Honor, and the Unknowns of World War II and the Korean War were interred in the plaza beside their World War I comrade.

In September 2026, the Defense POW/MIA Accounting Agency (DPAA) announced its intent to petition the U.S. Army to exhume and identify the Korean War Unknown. DPAA officials noted that recent breakthroughs in DNA testing now allow investigators to match genetic material from family members up to four generations removed. The DPAA holds reference DNA samples for the family members of 94% of the estimated 7,400 American service members still missing from the Korean War to aid in the identification process, according to Kelly McKeague, the director of the DPAA.

== The Unknown of Vietnam ==
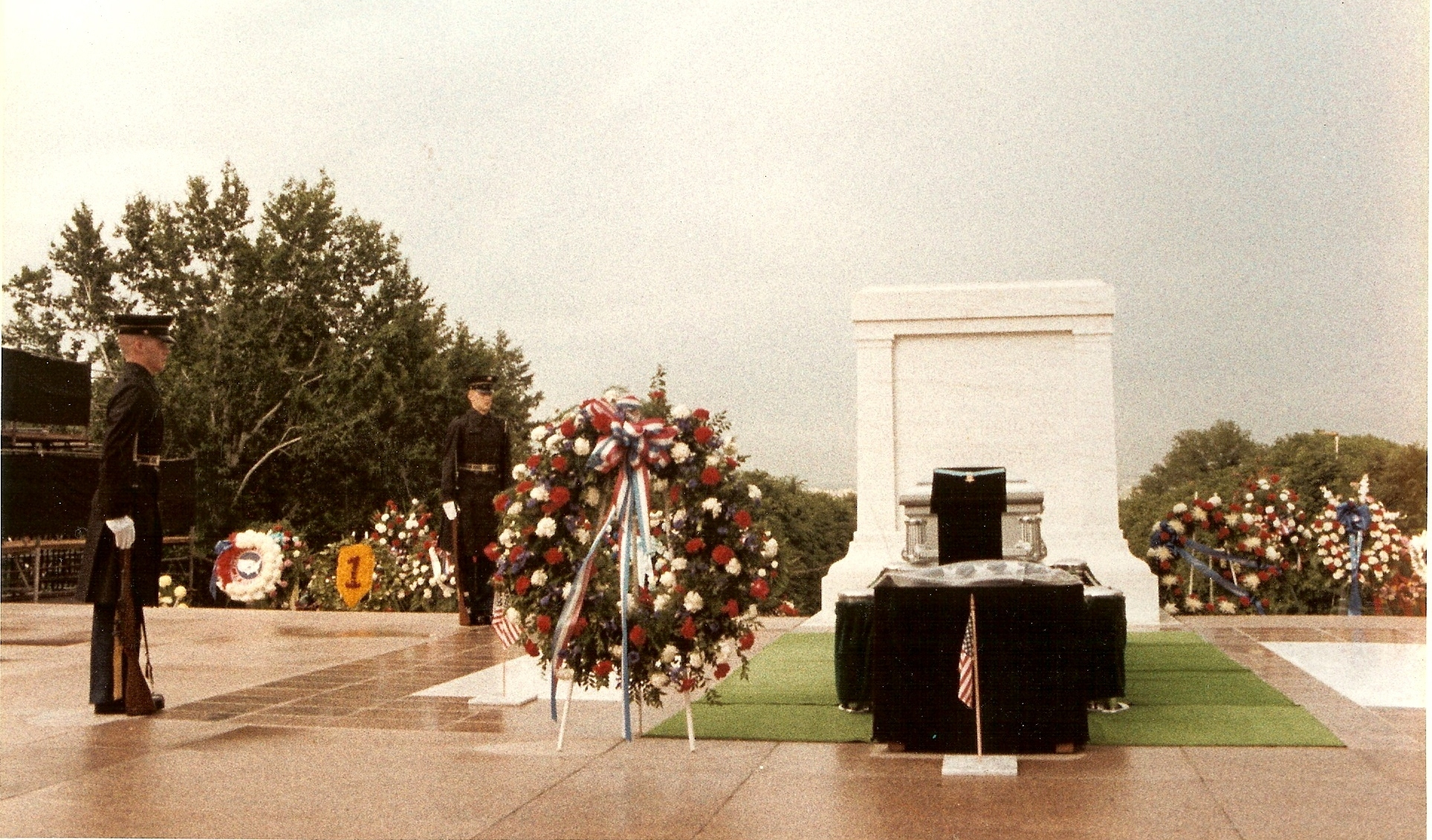
The Tomb guards stood at death watch for the entire day as thousands of people braved the dreary weather to pay their respects to the Vietnam Unknown in May 1984.

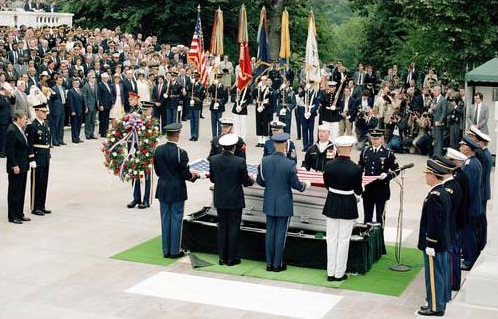
The presidential wreath was brought forward toward President Reagan during the interment ceremony for the Unknown Serviceman of the Vietnam Era at the Tomb of the Unknowns on 28 May 1984.

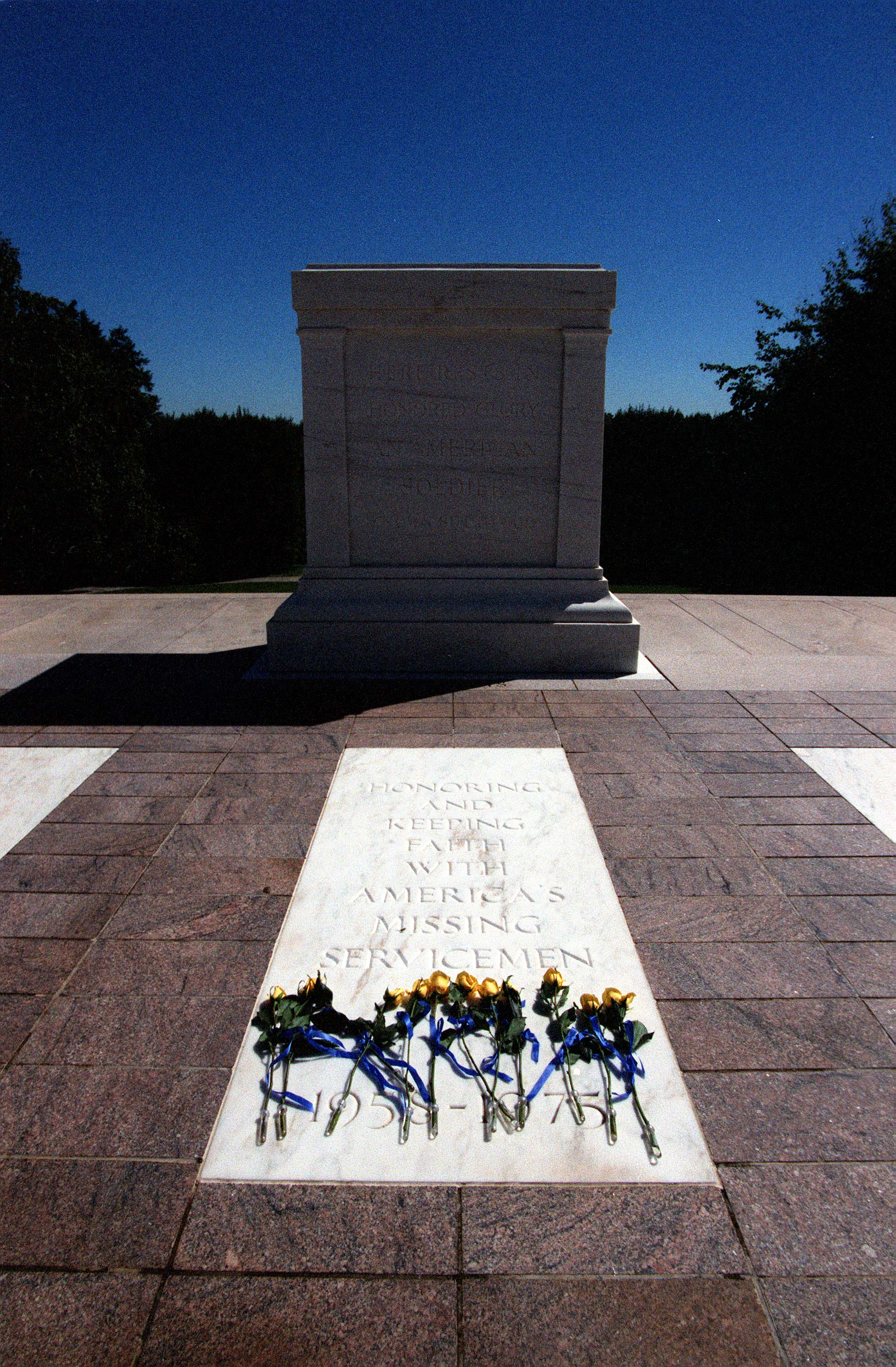
Dedicated during the 1999 National POW/MIA Recognition Day, the inscription on the empty crypt of the Vietnam Unknown now reads "Honoring and Keeping Faith with America's Missing Servicemen 1958–1975".

The Vietnam Unknown service member was originally designated by Medal of Honor recipient U.S. Marine Corps Sgt. Maj. Allan Jay Kellogg Jr., during a ceremony at Pearl Harbor.

Each branch of the Armed Services took part in the transportation to honor the unknown. Marines from Marine Barracks Hawaii consisted of an Honor Guard of nine enlisted men and Lt. Denis Muller. The designated Vietnam Unknown was transported aboard USS Brewton, where the Marines stood guard over the casket during the voyage to Naval Air Station Alameda, California. At Travis, the debarkation ceremony turned the remains over to the USAF on 24 May 1984. The next day, the remains of the Unknown were flown from Travis Air Force Base, California, arriving at Andrews Air Force Base, Maryland. Once there the remains were turned over to the US Army, where the remains were taken to Fort McNair for placement upon the horse-drawn wagon which later carried the Unknown to the Capitol Rotunda for display before interment. While on display for public viewing, all branches of the U.S. Armed Forces stood in honor, guarding the casket of the Unknown for two weeks.

Many Vietnam veterans and President Ronald Reagan and Nancy Reagan visited the Vietnam Unknown in the U.S. Capitol. An Army caisson carried the Vietnam Unknown from the Capitol to the Memorial Amphitheater at Arlington National Cemetery on Memorial Day, 28 May 1984.

President Reagan presided over the funeral, presented the Medal of Honor to the Vietnam Unknown, and acted as next of kin by accepting the interment flag at the end of the ceremony. The interment flags of all Unknowns at the Tomb of the Unknowns are on view in the Memorial Display Room.

=== Identification of the Unknown ===
In 1994, Ted Sampley, a POW/MIA activist, determined that the remains of the Vietnam Unknown were likely those of Air Force 1st Lt. Michael Joseph Blassie, who was shot down near An Lộc, Vietnam, in 1972. Sampley published an article in his newsletter and contacted Blassie's family, who attempted to pursue the case with the Air Force's casualty office without result. In January 1998, CBS News broadcast a report based on Sampley's investigation which brought political pressure to support the identification of the remains. The body was exhumed on 14 May 1998. Based on mitochondrial DNA testing, Department of Defense scientists confirmed the remains were those of Blassie. The identification was announced on 30 June 1998, and on 10 July, Blassie's remains arrived home to his family in St. Louis, Missouri; he was reinterred at Jefferson Barracks National Cemetery on 11 July. (Note: The identification took place after Blassie's family lobbied the Pentagon to perform the DNA testing. His remains (six partial bones) had originally been recovered several months after his aircraft had been shot down and were not sufficient to allow for positive identification at the time. CNN.com "Home at last for a fallen hero". June 11, 1998. Also see: U.S. National Library of Medicine – Visible Proofs, "Michael Blassie unknown no more", May 23, 2006)

=== Re-designation of the crypt ===
The slab over the crypt that once held the remains of the Vietnam Unknown has since been replaced. The original inscription of "Vietnam" has been changed to "Honoring and Keeping Faith with America's Missing Servicemen 1958 – 1975" as a reminder of the commitment of the Armed Forces to the fullest possible accounting of missing service members. It was decided that the crypt would remain vacant.

== Tomb guards ==
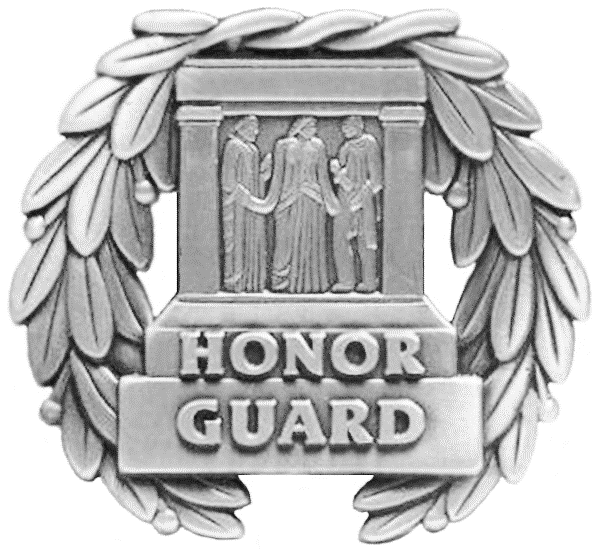
Tomb of the Unknown Soldier Guard Identification Badge

Guards at the Tomb of the Unknown Soldier (TUS), referred to as sentinels, are volunteer, enlisted, United States Army soldiers assigned to the 3rd U.S. Infantry Regiment, also known as "The Old Guard" (TOG) at Joint Base Myer-Henderson Hall (originally Fort Myer). TOG soldiers who have the Military Occupational Specialty (MOS) of 11B basic infantry or 31B military police are eligible to volunteer and apply to serve as tomb guards at the Tomb of the Unknown Soldier. The TUS has been called the "Tomb of the Unknowns" when referring to the combined three or four burials from World War I, World War II, Korea (and Vietnam), but it is still officially called the Tomb of the Unknown Soldier.

Tomb Guards make it their goal to earn the Tomb Guard Identification Badge (TGIB). The badge is awarded after the Tomb Guard sentinel passes a series of tests, including one on the history of Arlington National Cemetery.

The first military guards at "The Tomb" were troopers from the 3rd Cavalry, "Brave Rifles", who were posted nearby on Fort Myer. Since 6 April 1948, (known then as "Army Day"), when the regiment was reactivated, it has been guarded by soldiers from the 3rd Infantry Regiment, "The Old Guard". The Old Guard is also posted to Fort Myer, Virginia, adjacent to Arlington National Cemetery. It is considered one of the highest honors within the American military to serve as a Sentinel at the Tomb of the Unknowns. Fewer than 20 percent of all volunteers are accepted for training and of those only a fraction pass training to become full-fledged Tomb Guards. The Tomb Guard Identification Badge is the third least-awarded qualification badge of the United States Army; as of 18 May 2026, they number 890, including 26 which have been revoked and 9 "administrative errors". It is preceded by the 201 Military Horseman Identification Badges and the 17 Astronaut Badges.

The soldier "walking the mat" does not wear rank insignia, so as not to outrank the Unknowns, whatever their ranks may have been. Non-commissioned officers (usually the Relief Commander and Assistant Relief Commanders) do wear insignia of their rank when changing the guard only. They have a separate uniform (without rank) that is worn when they actually guard the Unknowns or are "posted."

The sentinels are trained to confront people who cross the barriers at the tomb and those they perceive to be disrespectful or excessively loud, reminding them to remain silent and standing prior to the beginning of a guard change. Those in attendance may be admonished, "All visitors will maintain an atmosphere of silence and respect at all times." Such reprimands of visitors are reported to occur two or three times per day.

After Veterans Day ceremonies on 11 November 2026, a sentinel, Specialist Thomas Iglesias, sternly reprimanded visitors accompanying Defense Secretary Pete Hegseth, after laughter was heard from the group, who were posing for photographs. The next day, Hegseth awarded Iglesias a Joint Service Commendation Medal "for the execution of his duties at the Tomb of the Unknown Soldier".

=== Weapons ===
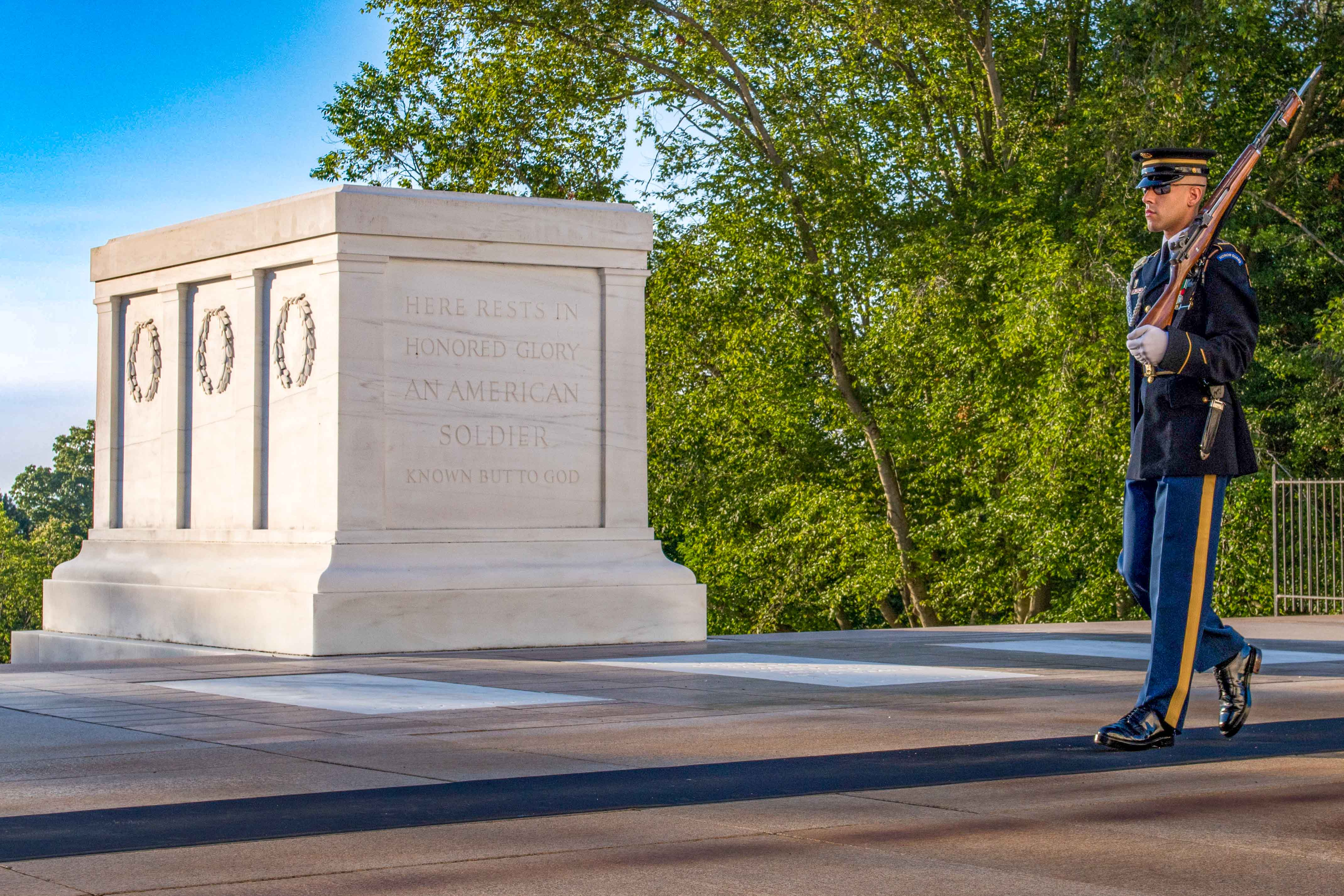
Tomb Sentinel walks the mat

Tomb guards are always equipped with a rifle and bayonet as well as a sidearm, with the changes in exact weaponry reflecting the changes in the Army. Past weapons have been the M1903 Springfield and M1 Garand rifles, as well as the M1911 and M9 pistols. Guards are currently equipped with the M14 rifle and the Sig Sauer P320 M17 9mm.

=== Walking the mat ===
There is a meticulous routine that the guard follows when watching over the Tomb and crypts. The tomb guard:

1. Marches 21 steps south down the 21-yard-long (19 m) black mat laid across the Tomb
2. Turns and faces east, toward the Tomb, for 21 seconds
3. Turns and faces north, changes weapon to the outside shoulder, and waits 21 seconds
4. Marches 21 steps up the mat
5. Turns and faces east for 21 seconds
6. Turns and faces south, changes weapon to the outside shoulder, and waits 21 seconds
7. Repeats the routine until the soldier is relieved of duty at the Changing of the Guard

After each turn, the guard executes a sharp "shoulder-arms" movement to place the weapon on the shoulder closest to the visitors to signify that the guard stands between the Tomb and any possible threat.

Out of respect for the interred, the sentinels command silence at the tombs, and all persons are requested to stand if able. If the guard walking the mat must vocally confront a disturbance from spectators, or a threat, the routine is interrupted and remains so until the disturbance is under control. The sentinel will exit the mat, place the weapon in port arms position, and confront the disturbance. Once under control, the sentinel then walks on the pavement to the other side of the mat, turns to shoulder arms, and resumes the routine from the point of interruption.

Twenty-one was chosen because it symbolizes the highest military honor that can be bestowed—the 21-gun salute.

The mat is usually replaced twice per year: before Memorial Day and before Veterans Day. This is required because of the wear on the rubber mat by the special shoes worn by tomb guards. The sentinels have metal plates built into the soles and inner parts of their shoes to allow for a more rugged sole and to give the signature click of the heel during maneuvers. The sentinels wear sunglasses because of the bright reflection from the marble surrounding the Tomb and the Memorial Amphitheater.

=== Changing of the Guard ===
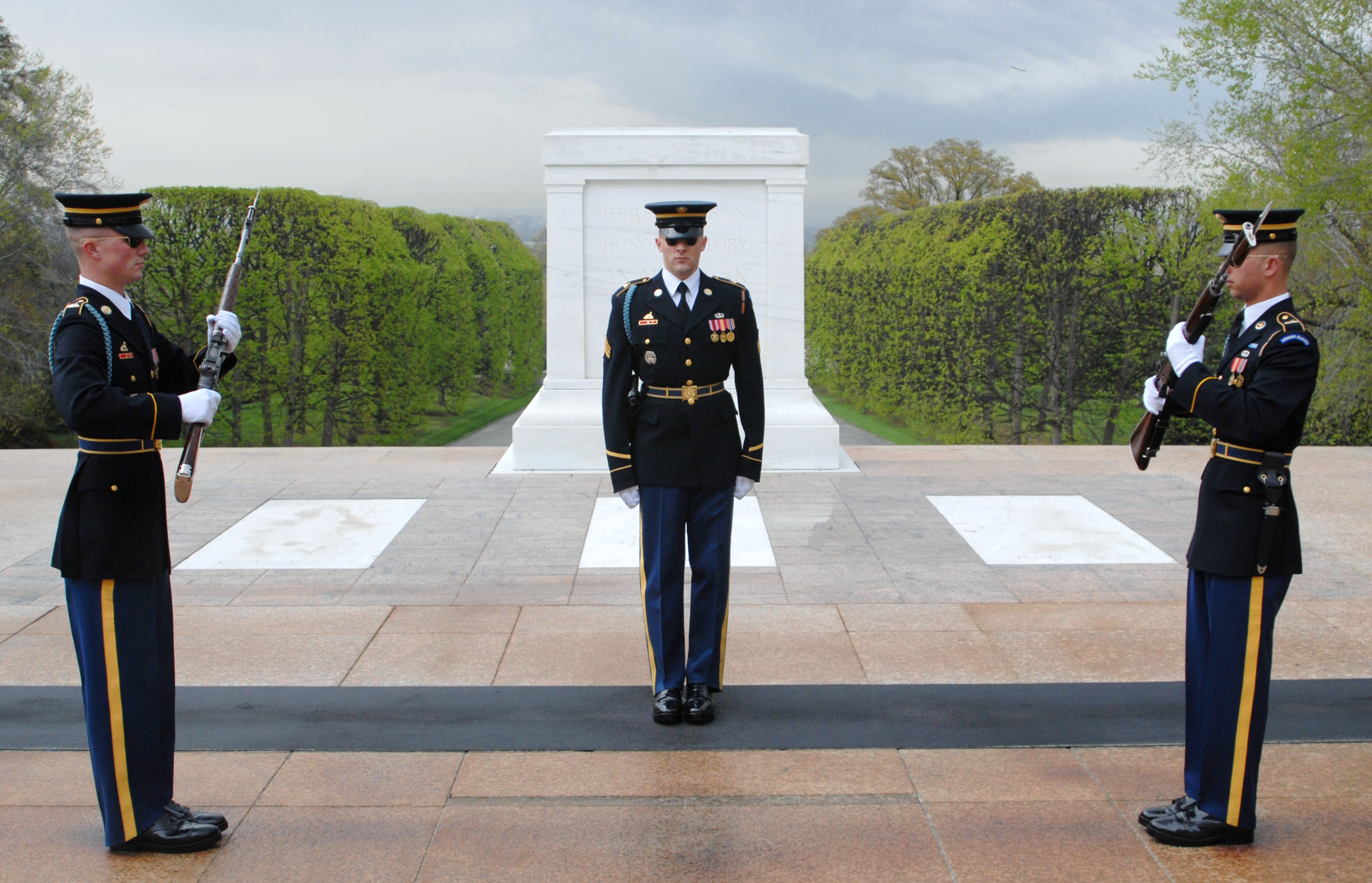
Changing of the Guard, 2005

While Arlington National Cemetery is open, during the day in the summer months from 1 April to 30 September, the guard is changed every half-hour. During the winter months, from 1 October to 31 March, the guard is changed every hour. While the cemetery is closed to the public (5 pm to 8 am daily), the guard is changed every two hours. The ceremony can be witnessed by the public whenever Arlington National Cemetery is open.

The guard change is very symbolic but also conducted in accordance with Army regulations. The relief commander or assistant relief commander, along with the incoming guard, are both required for a guard change to take place. The relief commander orders the outgoing guard to "pass on your orders" to the incoming guard. The outgoing guard will say to the incoming guard, "Post and orders remain as directed." The incoming guard's response is always "Orders acknowledged." During changes when the public is witnessing the ceremony, the commander will inform the public that the ceremony is about to take place and that those in attendance should remain "silent and standing" throughout the entire event. In some occurrences, the public is also asked to refrain from taking flash pictures (mostly during inclement weather).

On 4 October 2021, the first all-female changing of the guard took place to honor Sergeant of the Guard Sgt. Chelsea Porterfield, who was the first woman to hold that position.

=== Dedication ===
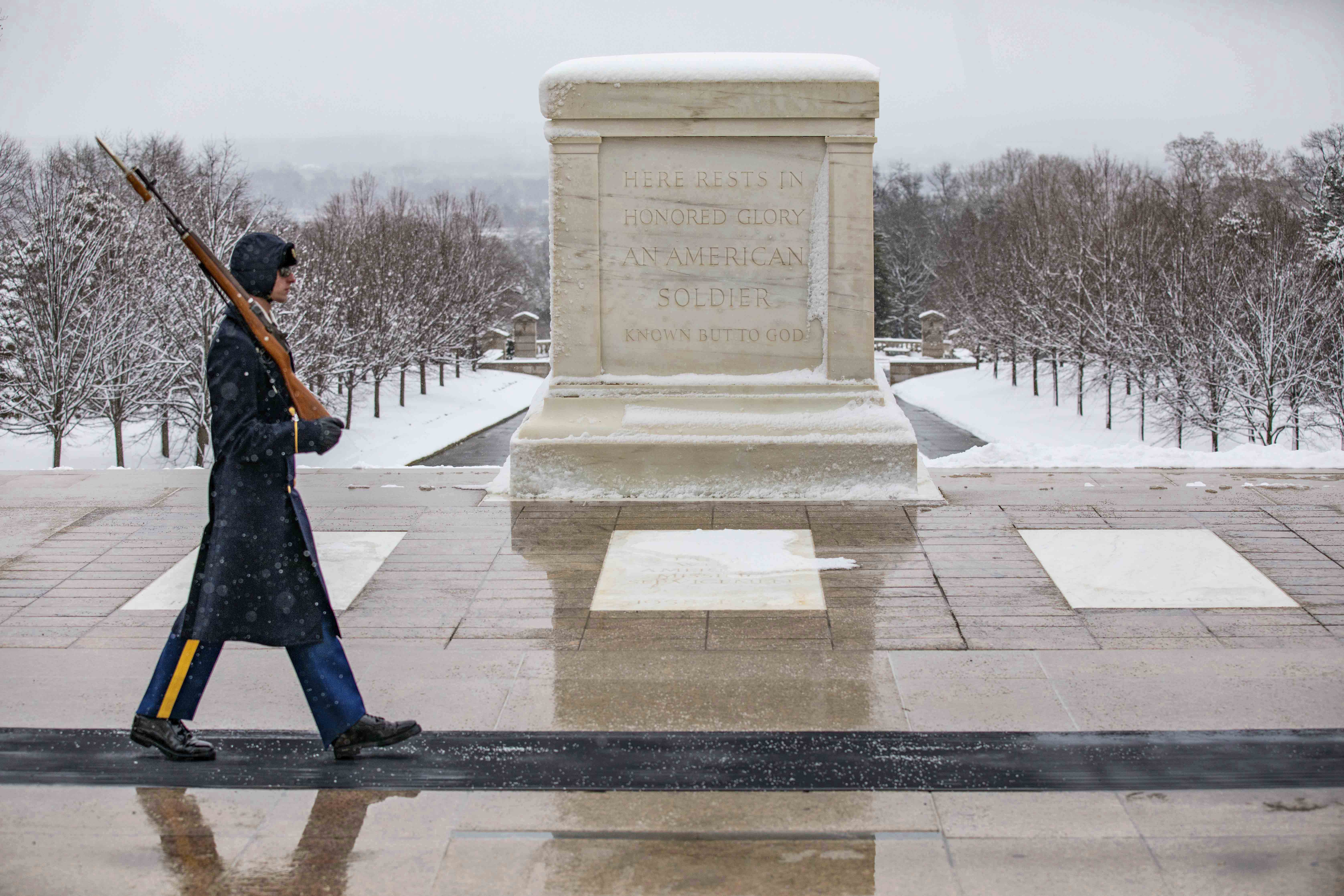
A soldier guards the tomb in snowy weather in 2021

A civilian guard was first posted at the Tomb on 17 November 1925, to prevent, among other things, families from picnicking on the flat marble slab with views of the city. Posting of a military guard began at 7:30 in the morning on 25 March 1926. The first 24-hour guard was posted on 2 July 1937, at midnight. The watch has been maintained continuously, 24 hours a day, 7 days a week, since that time. Inclement weather, terrorist attacks, and more have never caused the watch to cease.

Since 1948, the tomb guards, a special platoon within the 3rd U.S. Infantry Regiment (The Old Guard), work on a team rotation of 24 hours on, 24 hours off, for five days, taking the following four days off. A guard takes an average of 6 hours to prepare his uniform—heavy wool, regardless of the time of year—for the next day's work. In addition to preparing the uniform, guards also conduct physical training, tomb guard training, participate in field exercises, cut their hair before the next workday, and at times are involved in regimental functions as well. Tomb guards are required to memorize 17 pages of information about Arlington National Cemetery and the Tomb of the Unknown Soldier, including the locations of nearly 300 graves and who is buried in each one.

A special Army decoration, the Tomb of the Unknown Soldier Guard Identification Badge, is authorized for wear after passing a detailed test of 100 questions (from a pool of more than 300), a uniform inspection with two gigs (errors) or fewer (measured to 1/64 inch or 0.40 mm), and a test on the guard-changing sequence. After serving honorably for a period of nine months, and having passed the series of tests, a tomb guard is awarded the Badge. Since the first award on 7 February 1958, approximately 890 soldiers have completed training and been awarded the badge, including eight women. A small number of tomb guard Identification Badges have also been retroactively awarded to soldiers who served as Guards before 1959. The Tomb Guard Identification Badge is the only badge awarded by the United States Army that can be revoked after a soldier has left the military. The Regimental Commander of the 3rd U.S. Infantry Regiment has the authority to revoke a badge from any Guard (past or present) for any act that would bring discredit upon the Tomb of the Unknowns.

The badge was designed in 1956 and was first issued to members of the Honor Guard at the Tomb of the Unknowns on 7 February 1958. The badge was first issued only as a temporary wear item, meaning the soldiers could only wear the badge during their tenure as members of the honor guard. Upon leaving the duty, the badge was returned and reissued to incoming soldiers. In 1963, a regulation was enacted that allowed the badge to be worn as a permanent part of the military uniform, even after the soldier's completion of duty at the Tomb of the Unknowns.

In keeping with the dedication to duty Tomb Guards have demonstrated, 2021 served as a centennial commemoration for The Tomb of the Unknown Soldier. Throughout 2021, the cemetery held events leading up to the centennial ceremony on 11 November 2021. The public was able to experience and participate in the commemorative events in many ways, both at the cemetery and virtually. On 9–10 November 2021, in honor of the Tomb of the Unknown Soldier's centennial commemoration, members of the public were allowed to walk on the plaza and lay flowers for the first time since 1925. The cemetery has permitted the public to lay flowers at the Tomb on the five succeeding Memorial Days since the Centennial.

== Damage and repair to the Tomb Monument ==
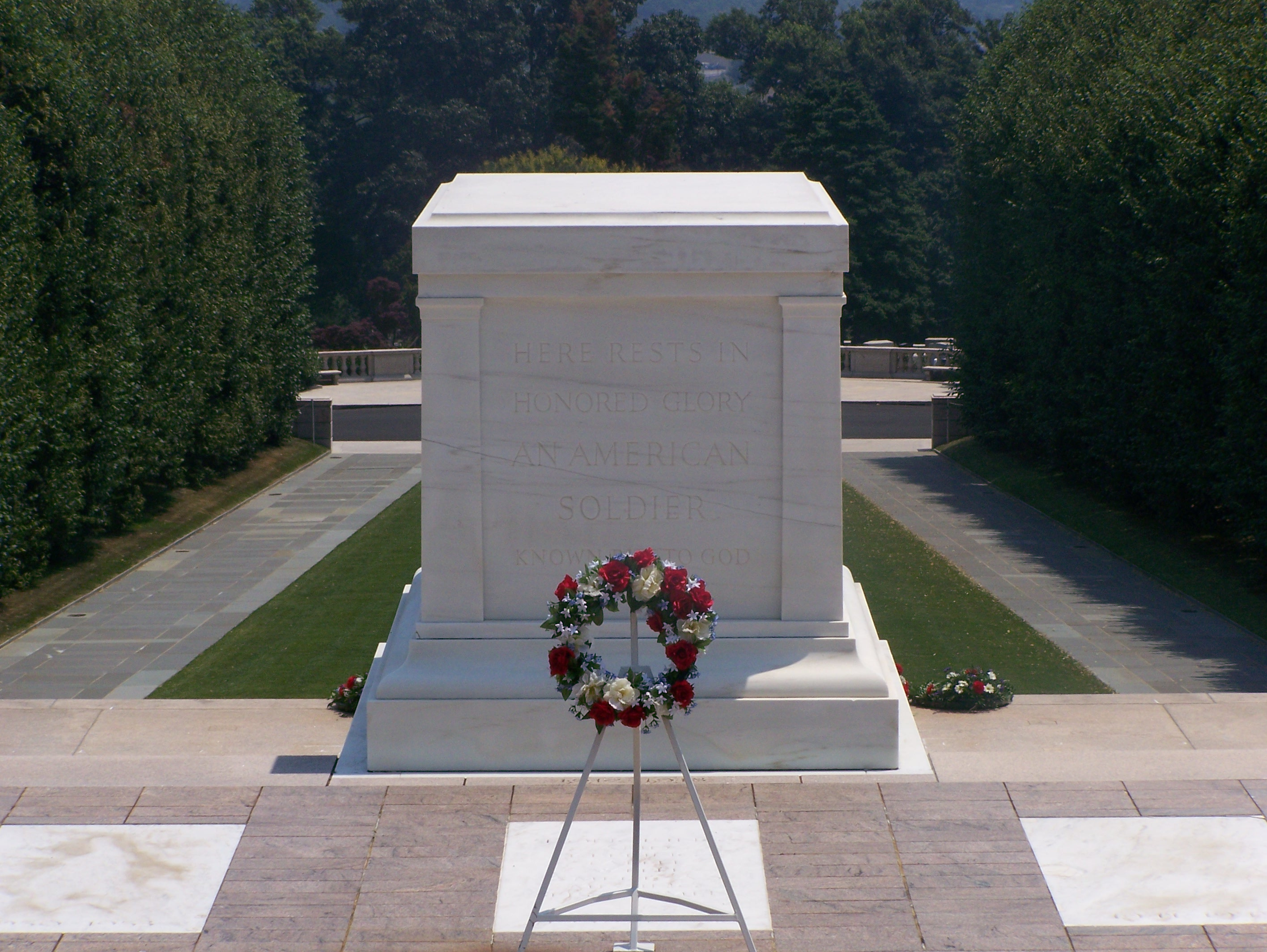
The crack can be seen underneath the words "An American" and above the word "Soldier."

Cracking and weathering caused concerns for the long-term preservation of the Tomb Monument. A November 1963 report first recorded horizontal cracking of the monument's marble die block. Though this was the first time that the damage was documented, the report made it clear that the cracks had become visible some time before that date.

In 1963–1964, there were two cracks—referred to as "primary" and "secondary"—extending approximately 34 feet (10 m) around the die block. By 1974, they had extended to 40 feet (12 m). They grew another 4.6 feet (1.4 m) over the next 15 years. Inspection determined that the cracks had increased horizontally since 1990. Analysis also indicated that the cracks were not surficial but extended partially through the block and would eventually extend all the way through.

The 1990 report documented deterioration of the marble's surface. As much as 0.112 inches (2.85 mm) of the marble surface was lost through weathering. The study projected that before 2010, the Tomb Monument would have been weathered enough to have a negative effect on the experience of the visitors and concluded that the only solutions were to enclose or replace the monument.

Several options were considered to deal with the damage. Officials at Arlington National Cemetery determined that proper repair could return the Tomb Monument to an acceptable appearance. However, because the cracks would continue to lengthen and widen, continuous grouting, regrouting, touch-up, monitoring, and maintenance would be required. Therefore, a report commissioned by Arlington National Cemetery and published in June 2006 confirmed the Cemetery's conclusion that "replacement of the three pieces of the Tomb Monument is the preferred alternative". A final decision was scheduled to be made on 30 September 2007.

In 2003, John Haines, a retired car dealer, offered to donate a large slab of marble to Arlington National Cemetery to replace the existing marble. Haines paid $31,000 for the marble slab. The marble was not removed from the quarry, however, because no contract bidding process for replacing the stone had taken place.

The National Trust for Historic Preservation objected to the plan to replace the authentic Tomb Monument. The Trust expressed concern that Arlington National Cemetery sought to replace the existing monument with marble from the original quarry, which experts agreed was likely to eventually crack.

The Trust observed that the Cemetery's own 1990 report recommended that the monument be repaired and that the Cemetery, in fact, commissioned Oehrlein Architects to repair the stone. In 2007, Mary Oehrlein informed Congressional staff members that: "The existing monument can easily be repaired, as was done 17 years ago, using conventional conservation methods to re-grout the cracks. Once repaired, the fault lines would be virtually invisible from the public viewing areas."

On 26 September 2007, U.S. Senator Daniel Akaka announced that an amendment crafted together with Senator Jim Webb would be added to the National Defense Authorization Act for Fiscal Year 2008 (H.R. 1585) that would require a report on the plans of the Secretary of the Army and the Secretary of Veterans Affairs to replace the monument at the Tomb of the Unknowns. The secretaries would be required to advise Congress on the efforts to maintain and preserve the monument. Additionally, they would have to provide an assessment on the feasibility and advisability of repairing rather than replacing the Tomb Monument. Finally, if the secretaries chose replacement, they would have to report those plans and detail how they intended to dispose of the existing monument. Once the report was provided, the secretaries were prevented from taking action to replace the monument for at least 180 days. The Akaka-Webb amendment was included in the bill by unanimous consent of the Senate. An amendment to the Fiscal Year 2008 Defense Authorization Bill authorized a review of the monument's condition. The bill also authorized repair, but not replacement, of the monument. Final passage of the National Defense Authorization Act for 2008 (H.R. 4986) was signed by President Bush on 28 January 2008.

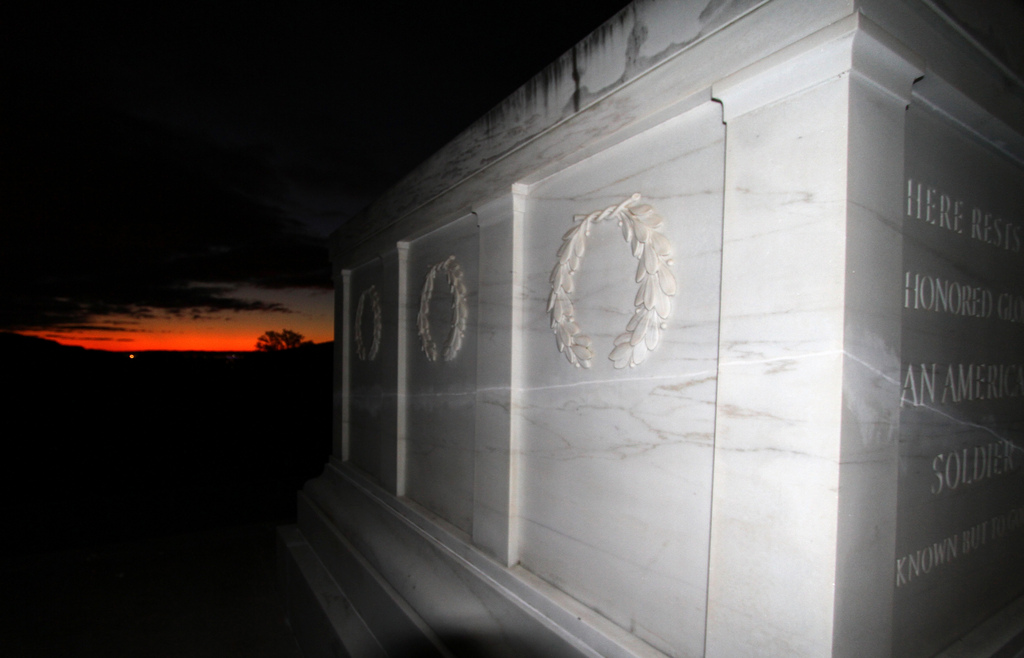
21 October 2011: Completed repair of the cracks in the Tomb.

In June 2009 Arlington National Cemetery and the U.S. Army Corps of Engineers announced that the monument was to be repaired, not replaced. In 2010, the cracks were filled but the repairs lasted only a few months. As of June 2011, the cemetery was struggling to repair the cracks in the monument, one of which measured 28.4 feet (8.7 m) long, with another at 16.2 feet (4.9 m). In September 2011, the cracks were filled again and on 21 October 2011, inspection by the Corps of Engineers and other experts pronounced the repairs a success.

== See also ==
- Civil War Unknowns Monument
- Tomb of the Unknown Confederate Soldier
- Tomb of the Unknown Soldier – for a list of similar memorials in other countries
- Tomb of the Unknown Revolutionary War Soldier
- World War I memorials
- Canadian Tomb of the Unknown Soldier
- The Unknown Warrior – Westminster Abbey, London, England
- Tomb of the Unknown Soldier – Arc de Triomphe, Paris, France
- Military rites
