= Allan J. Kellogg =

US Marine Corps Medal of Honor recipient

Allan J. Kellogg Jr.
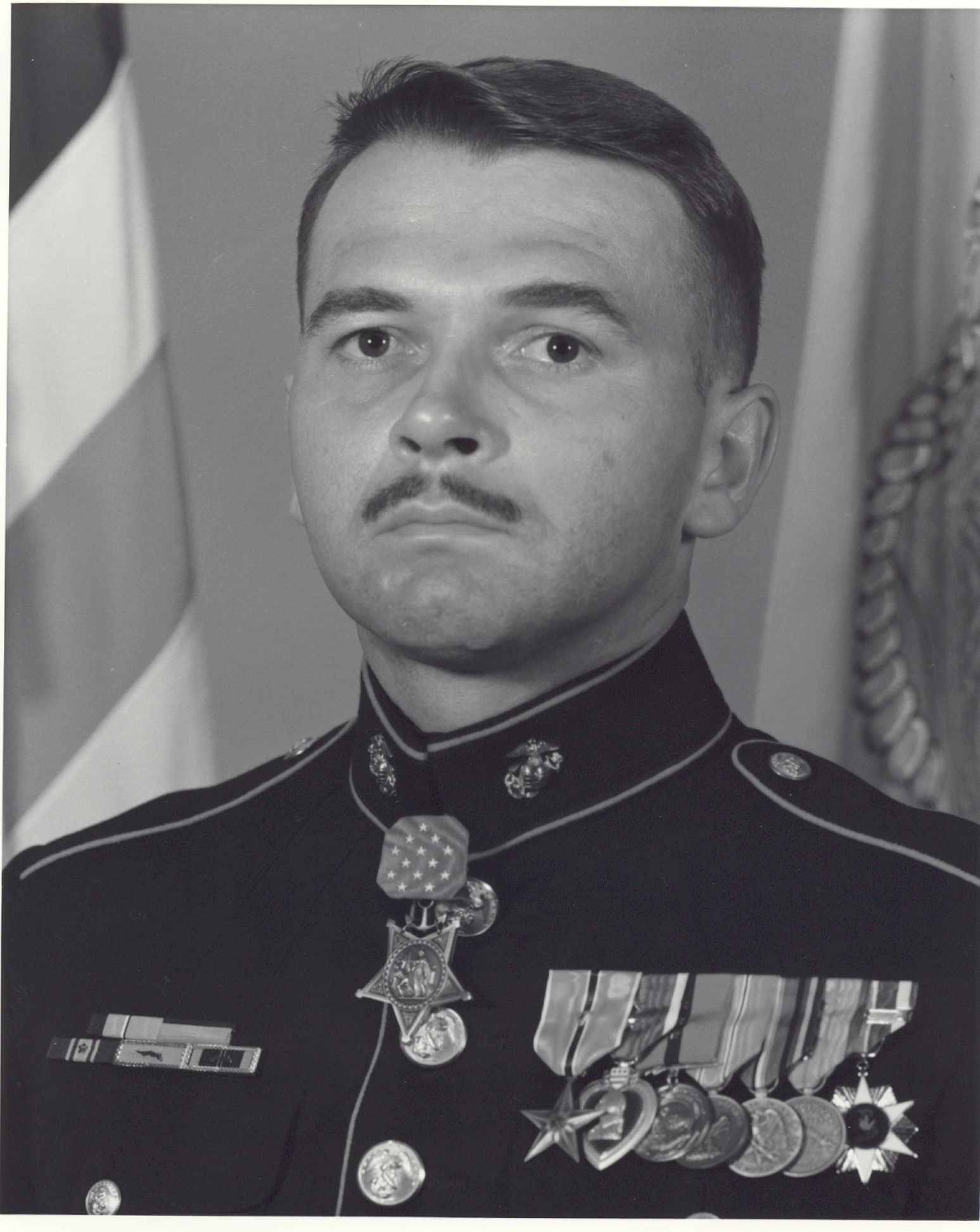
- Born: October 1, 1943 (age 83); Bethel, Connecticut, U.S.
- Military career
- Allegiance: United States
- Branch: United States Marine Corps
- Service years: 1960–1990
- Rank: Sergeant Major
- Units: Company G, 2nd Battalion, 5th Marines
- Conflicts: Vietnam War
- Awards: Medal of Honor; Bronze Star Medal; Purple Heart (3)

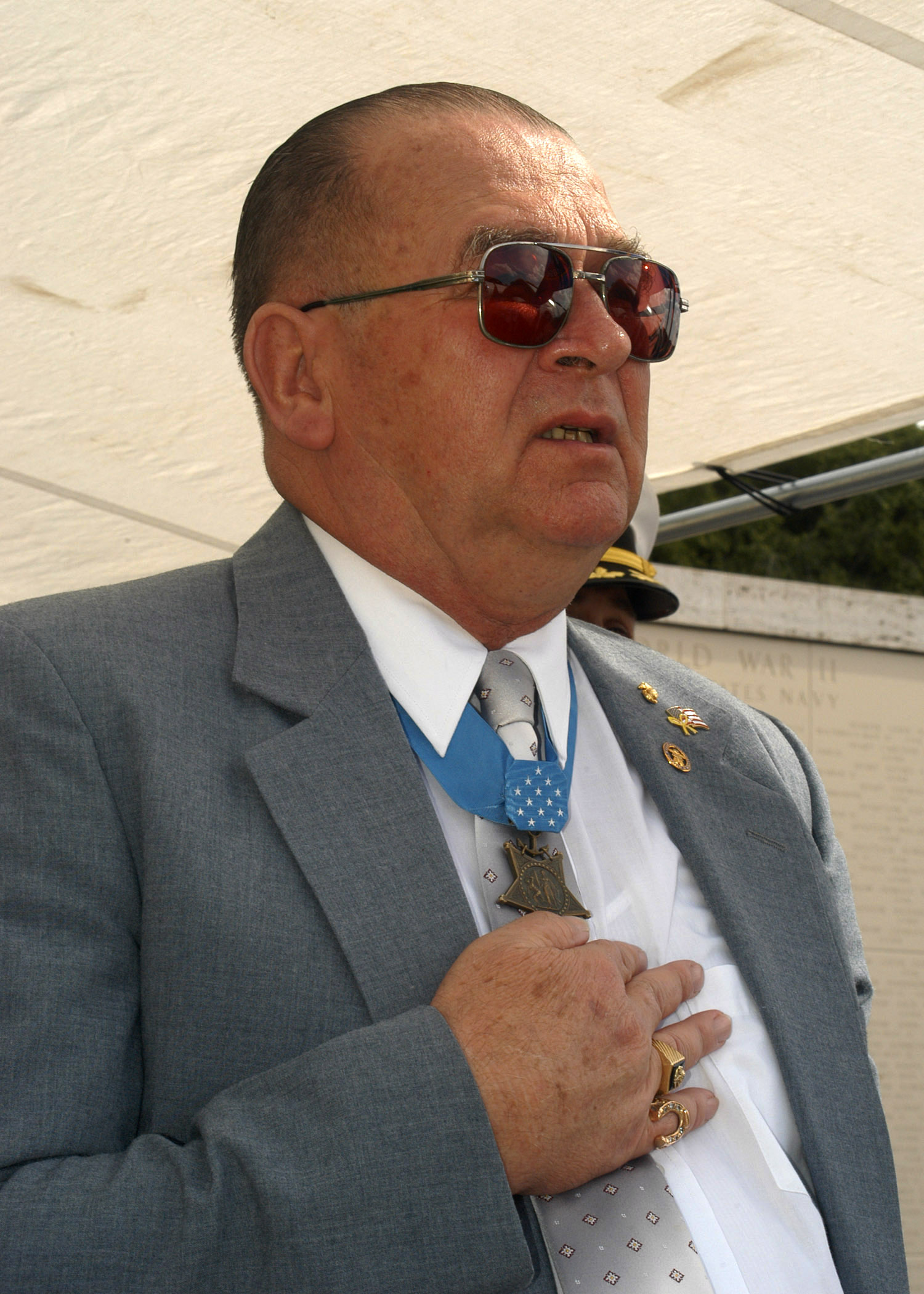
Kellogg in 2003

Allan Jay Kellogg Jr. (born October 1, 1943) is a retired sergeant major in the United States Marine Corps. He received the United States military's highest decoration, the Medal of Honor, for his actions as a staff sergeant on March 11, 1970, during the Vietnam War.

== Early life ==
Kellogg was born on October 1, 1943, in Bethel, Connecticut, and graduated from elementary school there in 1958. He attended Bethel High School for two years before dropping out in 1959. He enlisted in the United States Marine Corps on November 14, 1960, in Bridgeport, Connecticut.

== Marine Corps service ==
Kellogg received recruit training at the Marine Corps Recruit Depot Parris Island, South Carolina, and individual combat training at Camp Lejeune, North Carolina. Following graduation, he was assigned duty as a rifleman, assistant automatic rifleman, and fire team leader, consecutively, with Company K, 3rd Battalion, 2nd Marine Division, Camp Lejeune. He was promoted to private first class in June 1961, to lance corporal in April 1962, and to corporal in October 1962. From December 1962 until November 1964, Kellogg served as squad leader with Company D, 1st Battalion, 4th Marines, 1st Marine Brigade. Upon his return to the United States, he was assigned duty as Sergeant of the Guard, Marine Air Base Squadron 31, Marine Aircraft Group 31 at Beaufort, South Carolina. He was promoted to sergeant on May 1, 1965.

In March 1966, Kellogg was transferred to South Vietnam where he served as Weapons Platoon Sergeant and, later, Company Supply Non-commissioned Officer of Company F, 2nd Battalion 9th Marines, 3rd Marine Division. He was promoted to staff sergeant on July 1, 1967. In December, Kellogg was assigned to the 2nd Marine Division, Camp Lejeune, serving as a squad leader with M-16 Special Task Group Command, 3rd Battalion 8th Marines and subsequently as a platoon sergeant and, later, platoon commander of Company I, 3rd Battalion 6th Marines.

Returning for his second tour of duty in December 1969, Kellogg served briefly as a platoon sergeant with Company A, 1st Battalion, 26th Marines. During March 1970, he was reassigned duty as a platoon sergeant of Company G, 2nd Battalion, 5th Marines, 1st Marine Division. His actions on March 11, 1970, earned him the Medal of Honor. Wounded in action in Quang Nam Province on May 8, 1970, he was evacuated to the United States Naval Hospital, Yokosuka, Japan.

Kellogg was released from hospital in October 1970 and returned to duty that December, when he assumed his assignment as Instructor, Field Medical Service School, at Camp Pendleton, California. He was promoted to gunnery sergeant on July 1, 1972. In 1975 during the final days and hours of the Vietnam War, he served at Marine Barracks, Pearl Harbor, his office in the legendary Puller Hall. During the Fall of Saigon, while the last Marine troops were conducting the evacuation of the United States Embassy in Saigon (March, April 1975) he wheeled a television from an office, down the hall, into the squad bay. He put the news on, responding to questions of subordinates. Kellogg was later promoted to sergeant major, and retired from the Marine Corps in October 1990.

In May 1984, Kellogg designated The Unknown service member from the Vietnam War during a ceremony at Pearl Harbor, Hawaii. The Unknown service member was later identified in 1998 as Air Force Lieutenant Michael Blassie, following mitochondrial DNA testing.

== Later life ==
After retiring from the military, Kellogg remained in Hawaii and worked for the Department of Veterans Affairs as a benefit counselor at Tripler Army Medical Center in Honolulu.

== Awards and honors ==
A complete list of his medals and decorations includes:

	Medal of Honor		
Bronze Star Medal w/ valor device	Purple Heart w/ 2 award stars	Combat Action Ribbon	Navy Presidential Unit Citation
Navy Meritorious Unit Commendation w/ 1 service star	Marine Corps Good Conduct Medal w/ 8 service stars	National Defense Service Medal w/ 1 service star	Armed Forces Expeditionary Medal
Vietnam Service Medal w/ 5 service stars	Vietnam Gallantry Cross unit citation	Vietnam Civil Actions unit citation	Vietnam Campaign Medal

=== Medal of Honor citation ===
The President of the United States takes pride in presenting the Medal of Honor to

Gunnery Sergeant Allen J. Kellogg Jr.
United States Marine Corps

for service as set forth in the following citation:

For conspicuous gallantry and intrepidity at the risk of his life above and beyond the call of duty while serving as a platoon sergeant with Company G, in connection with combat operations against the enemy on the night of March 11, 1970. Under the leadership of G/Sgt. Kellogg, a small unit from Company G was evacuating a fallen comrade when the unit came under a heavy volume of small arms and automatic weapons fire from a numerically superior enemy force occupying well-concealed emplacements in the surrounding jungle. During the ensuing fierce engagement, an enemy soldier managed to maneuver through the dense foliage to a position near the Marines, and hurled a hand grenade into their midst which glanced off the chest of G/Sgt. Kellogg. Quick to act, he forced the grenade into the mud in which he was standing, threw himself over the lethal weapon and absorbed the full effects of its detonation with his body thereby preventing serious injury or possible death to several of his fellow Marines. Although suffering multiple injuries to his chest and his right shoulder and arm, G/Sgt. Kellogg resolutely continued to direct the efforts of his men until all were able to maneuver to the relative safety of the company perimeter. By his heroic and decisive action in risking his life to save the lives of his comrades, G/Sgt. Kellogg reflected the highest credit upon himself and upheld the finest traditions of the Marine Corps and the U.S. Naval Service.

== See also ==
- List of Medal of Honor recipients
- List of Medal of Honor recipients for the Vietnam War
