= Lorimer Rich =

American architect (1891–1978)

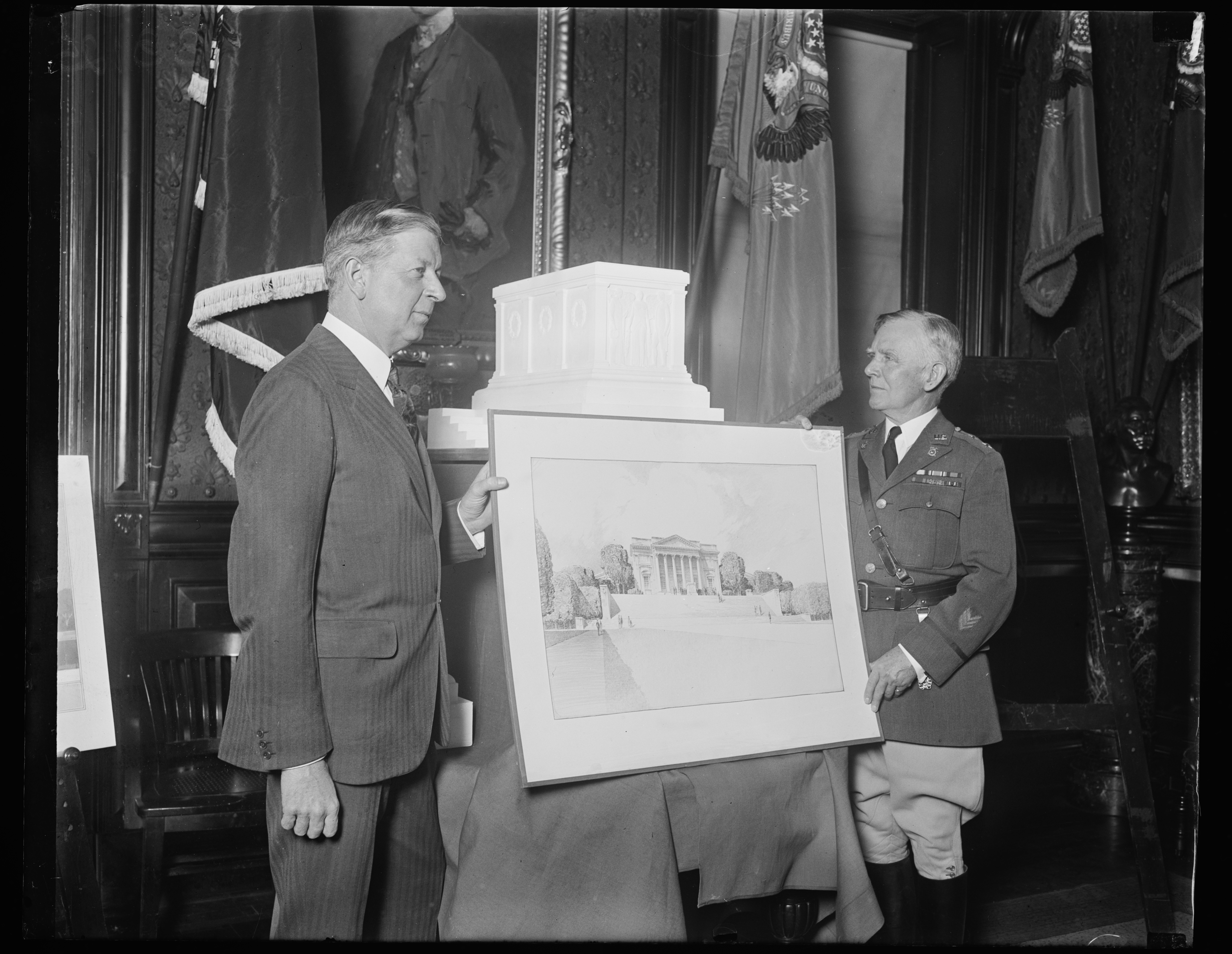
Secretary of War Dwight F. Davis (left) and Major General B. F. Cheatham, Quartermaster General of the U.S. Army, inspect the accepted model and design for the completion of the Tomb of the Unknown Soldier (1928). The design by sculptor Thomas Hudson Jones and architect Lorimer Rich was selected after a competition in which 73 designs were submitted.

Lorimer Rich (December 24, 1891 – June 2, 1978) was an American architect, born in Camden, New York. He is now best remembered for collaborating with sculptor Thomas Hudson Jones on the winning entry in a nationwide competition to create a design for the Tomb of the Unknown Soldier in Arlington National Cemetery.

Rich graduated from Syracuse University in 1914. This was followed by further studies in Europe, a standard path for many young American architects of that era. Shortly thereafter he joined the US Army and served in World War I.

Upon returning to the United States, he worked for the prestigious architectural firm McKim, Mead and White, based in New York City.

In 1928 he established his own firm there, and he gained a reputation as a designer of post offices for the federal government.

Rich returned to Camden after retiring from practice and he died there in 1978. He was buried in Arlington National Cemetery not far from the Tomb of the Unknown Soldier. Later his wife, Martha Ross Leigh (1894–1987) was buried with him.

== Commissions ==
- Second Corps Area Headquarters – Pershing Hall, Fort Jay, Governors Island, New York, 1934
- Great Barrington Main Post Office, Great Barrington, Massachusetts, 1935
- Flatbush Sub-station of the Brooklyn Post Office, 1935
- Station "A", Brooklyn Post Office, 1935
- Kensington Post Office, 1935
- Morris Heights Post Office, Bronx, New York
- Madison Square Branch, Post Office, 1937
- Forest Hills Post Office, 1937
- Johnstown Post Office – Johnstown, Pennsylvania, 1938
- Joe and Emily Lowe Gallery, Syracuse University, 1952
- Archbold Gymnasium, additions to, Syracuse University, 1952
- Women's Building, Syracuse University, 1953
- Ernest I White Law College, Syracuse University, 1954
- "and various dormitories" at Syracuse University
- New York State Insurance Fund Building, 199 Church Street, New York City, 1955
- Rich Hall of the State University of New York at Oswego named after Grace Ellingwood Rich, the sister of Lorimer Rich
- Camden United Methodist Church, 132 Main Street, Camden New York, 1969
- Tomb of the Unknown Soldiers of the American Revolution, 201 North James Street, Rome New York, 1976
