= United States Post Office (Williamsburg, Brooklyn) =

Historic post office in Brooklyn, New York

- US Post Office-Metropolitan Station
- U.S. National Register of Historic Places
- New York State Register of Historic Places
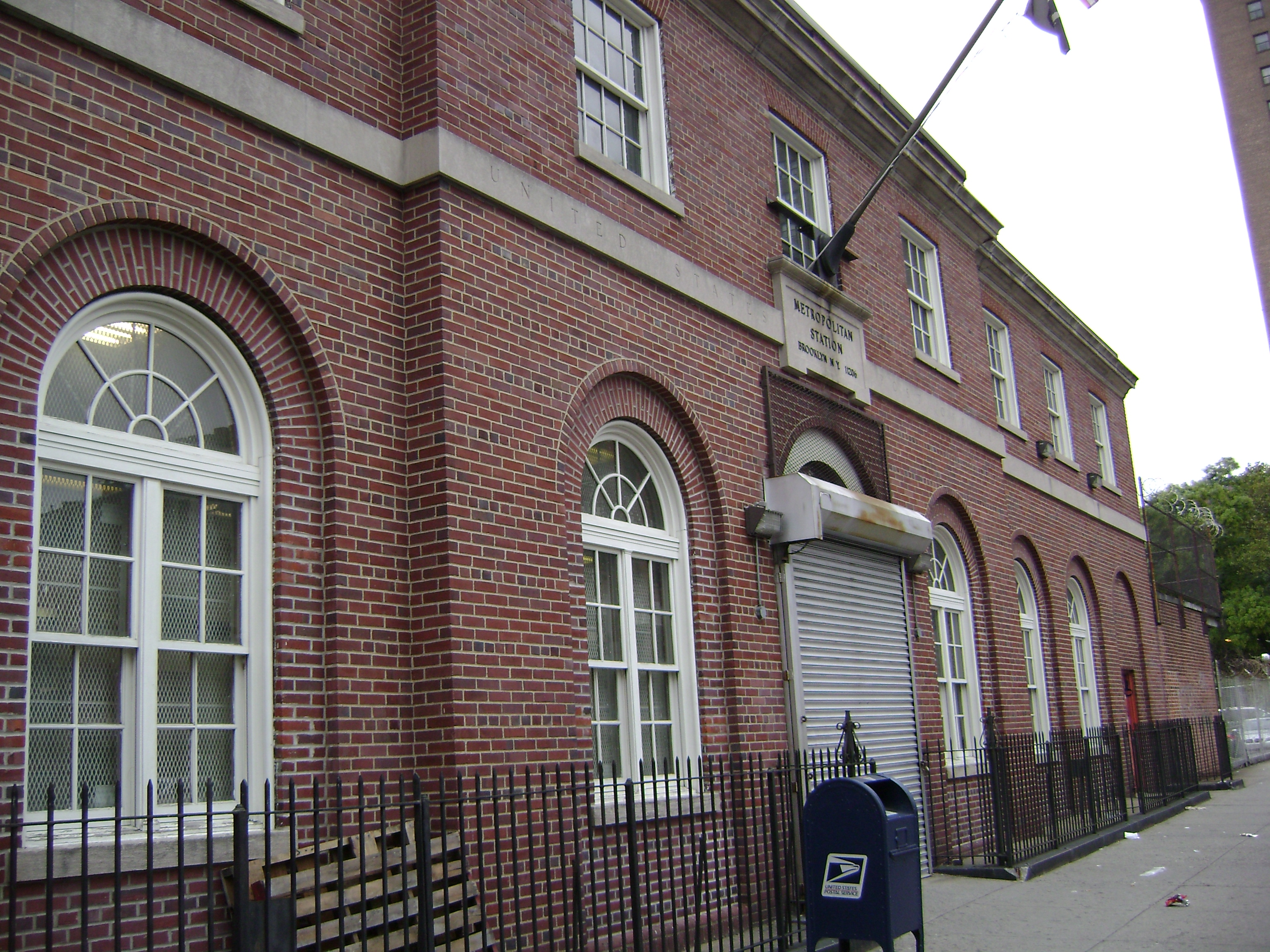

- Location within New York City Location within New York Location within the United States
- Location: 47 Debevoise St., Williamsburg, Brooklyn
- Coordinates: 40°42′7″N 73°56′28.5″W
- Area: less than one acre
- Built: 1936
- Architect: U.S. Treasury Dept.
- Architectural style: Colonial Revival
- MPS: US Post Offices in New York State, 1858-1943, TR
- NRHP reference No.: 88002462
- NYSRHP No.: 04701.002506

Significant dates
- Added to NRHP: November 17, 1988
- Designated NYSRHP: November 17, 1988

US Post Office-Metropolitan Station, originally known as Station "A," is a historic post office building located at Williamsburg in Brooklyn, New York, United States. It was built in 1936, and is one of a number of post offices in New York designed by the Office of the Supervising Architect under Louis A. Simon. The building is a two-story, flat roofed brick building with a three bay wide central pavilion flanked by three bay wide wings in the Colonial Revival style. A contributing architect is believed to be Lorimer Rich.

It was listed on the National Register of Historic Places in 1988.
