= United States Post Office–Great Barrington Main =

- US Post Office, Great Barrington Main
- U.S. National Register of Historic Places
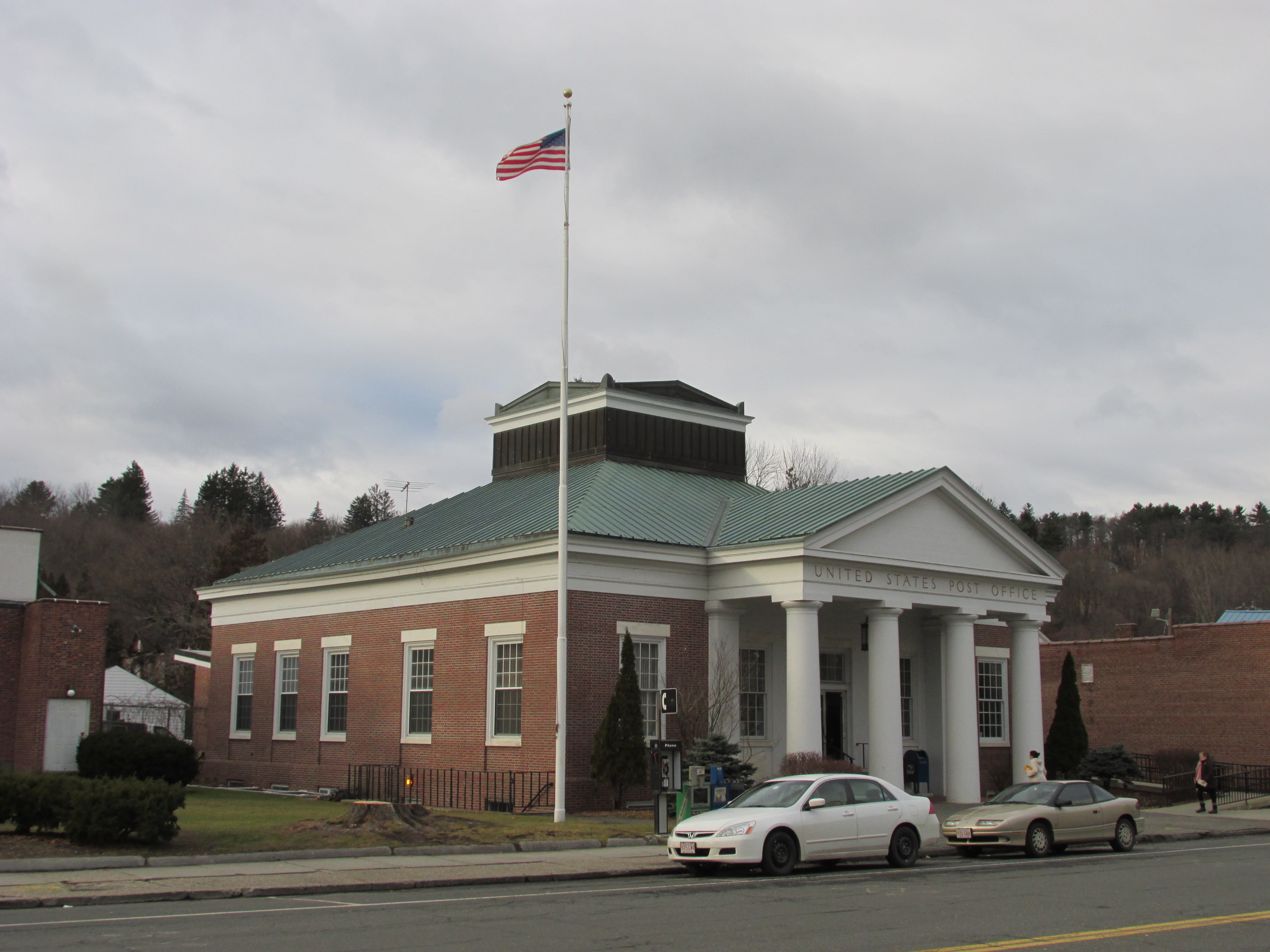

- Location within Massachusetts Location within the United States
- Location: 222 Main St., Great Barrington, Massachusetts
- Coordinates: 42°11′47″N 73°21′40″W
- Area: less than one acre
- Built: 1935
- Architect: Louis A. Simon, Lorimer Rich
- NRHP reference No.: 86000163
- Added to NRHP: January 10, 1986

US Post Office–Great Barrington Main is a historic post office at 222 Main Street in Great Barrington, Massachusetts. It was designed by architect Lorimer Rich and completed in 1936. Its design is unusual, because the United States Postal Service was at that time trying to economize on building costs in part by using standardized plans; this building is a notable deviation from this. The building was listed on the National Register of Historic Places in 1986.

== Description and history ==
The Great Barrington Main Post Office is located in downtown Great Barrington, on the west side of Main Street at its junction with Dresser Avenue. It was built principally of brick, with marble, wood, and concrete details. The building is basically rectangular, with a wooden portico supported by Doric columns projecting from the center of the building's front, providing shelter for the main entrance. The columns are of concrete, the steps leading to the entrance are of granite, and there is marble detailing on the building walls. Inside, the postmaster's office is to the left, while banks of post office boxes line the walls in an L shape on the right. The back of the building, where mail is processed, is separated from the public space by a service area.

Great Barrington's position as a major economic center of southern Berkshire County since the early 19th century means it has had postal service since 1797. Until the construction of this building, those services were always provided in leased commercial spaces, private residences of the postmaster, and the local deed registry. The present building was designed by Lorimer Rich in 1935, and was completed in 1936 by D.A. Sullivan of Northampton. The Postal Service had in 1934 mandated the use of standardized plans from the Treasury Department's Office of the Supervising Architect for new post office construction. This building's neo-Classical design is the result of Rich's alteration of a standard plan.

== See also ==
- National Register of Historic Places listings in Berkshire County, Massachusetts
- List of United States post offices
