= Thomas Hudson Jones =

American sculptor

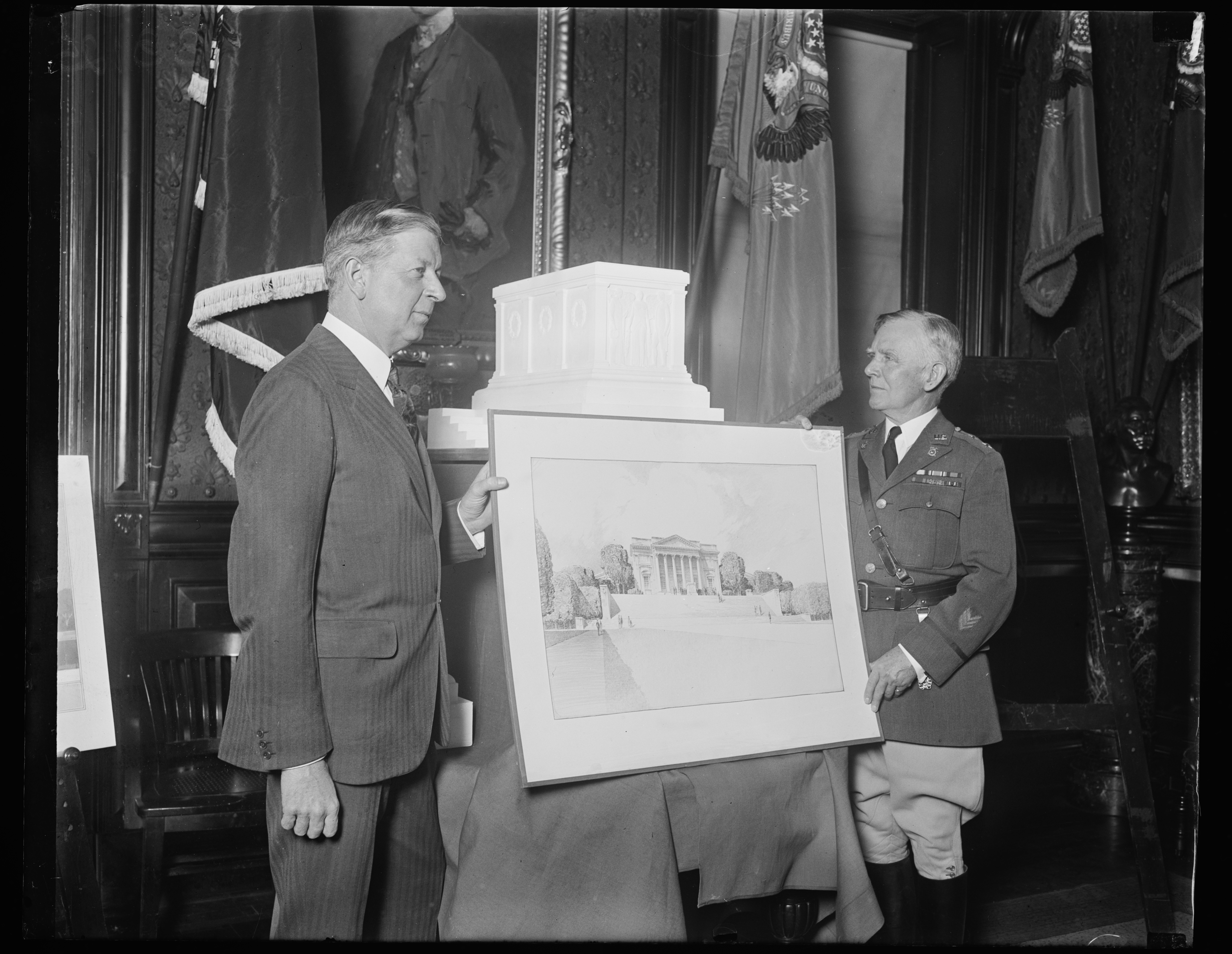
Secretary of War Dwight F. Davis (left) and Major General B. F. Cheatham, Quartermaster General of the U.S. Army, inspect the accepted model and design for the completion of the Tomb of the Unknown Soldier (1928). The design by sculptor Thomas Hudson Jones and architect Lorimer Rich was selected after a competition in which 73 designs were submitted.

Thomas Hudson Jones (July 24, 1892 – November 4, 1969) was a U.S. sculptor for the Army's Institute of Heraldry.

== Biography ==
Jones was born in Buffalo, New York. His father was an engraver and encouraged him from childhood to be a sculptor. He attended the Albright Art School in Buffalo, New York. Aged 19, he won the Rome Prize Fellowship for three years of study at the American Academy in Rome. The judges, however, decided that he was too young to go at the time. He worked in the studio of Daniel Chester French while French was working on the seated Lincoln for the Lincoln Memorial. Jones left French in 1917. He also created the Tomb of the Unknown Soldier. The Tomb of the Unknown Soldier is considered the most hallowed grave at Arlington Cemetery, America's most sacred military cemetery. The tombstone itself, designed by sculptor Thomas Hudson Jones, was not completed until 1932, when it was unveiled bearing the description “Here Rests in Honored Glory an American Soldier Known but to God.”

He also enlisted and served in World War I and after the war took the fellowship in Rome.

He returned to the United States in 1922 to sculpt and teach at Columbia University in New York City. In 1934 he returned to Rome to serve as a professor of Fine Arts at the American Academy in Rome.

At the request of the Government, Jones left his McDougal Alley studio in Greenwich Village, New York in 1944 and started work for the Institute of Heraldry in the Washington. He stayed with the Institute of Heraldry after the war ended.

He died in Hyannis, Massachusetts.

== Designs ==
Jones first job was a bust of General Grant made in collaboration with James Earle Fraser for the Hall of Fame for Great Americans.

Jones designed the ornate 50-foot-high bronze doors for the Brooklyn Central Library. In Washington, D.C., he designed three reliefs of law givers for the House of Representatives chamber in the United States Capitol (1950) and the Statue of Christ in St. Matthew's Church in Washington, D.C.

He designed the Air Force Academy seal as well over 40 US military service medals including the World War II Victory Medal, Army of Occupation Medal, and Vietnam Service Medal.

His most well-known design was the Tomb of the Unknown Soldier, with its architect Lorimer Rich, in 1929. This work made him well known in government circles even before he came to Washington.

== Family ==
Jones married Mildred Dudley, with whom he had four children: Anne, Kim, June, and Peter. His daughter, June Jones had a daughter, and his daughter Anne has two daughters still residing in Massachusetts. His great-grandchildren and great-great-grandchildren are attempting to reunite because of numerous adoptions in the family.

== Recognition ==
His work earned him international acclaim and he was recognized by Who's Who in Art, Who's Who in America, and was a Fellow of the American Academy in Rome and exhibitor and member of the National Academy of Design.
