= United States Post Office (Flatbush, Brooklyn) =

Historic post office in Brooklyn, New York

- US Post Office-Flatbush Station
- U.S. National Register of Historic Places
- New York State Register of Historic Places
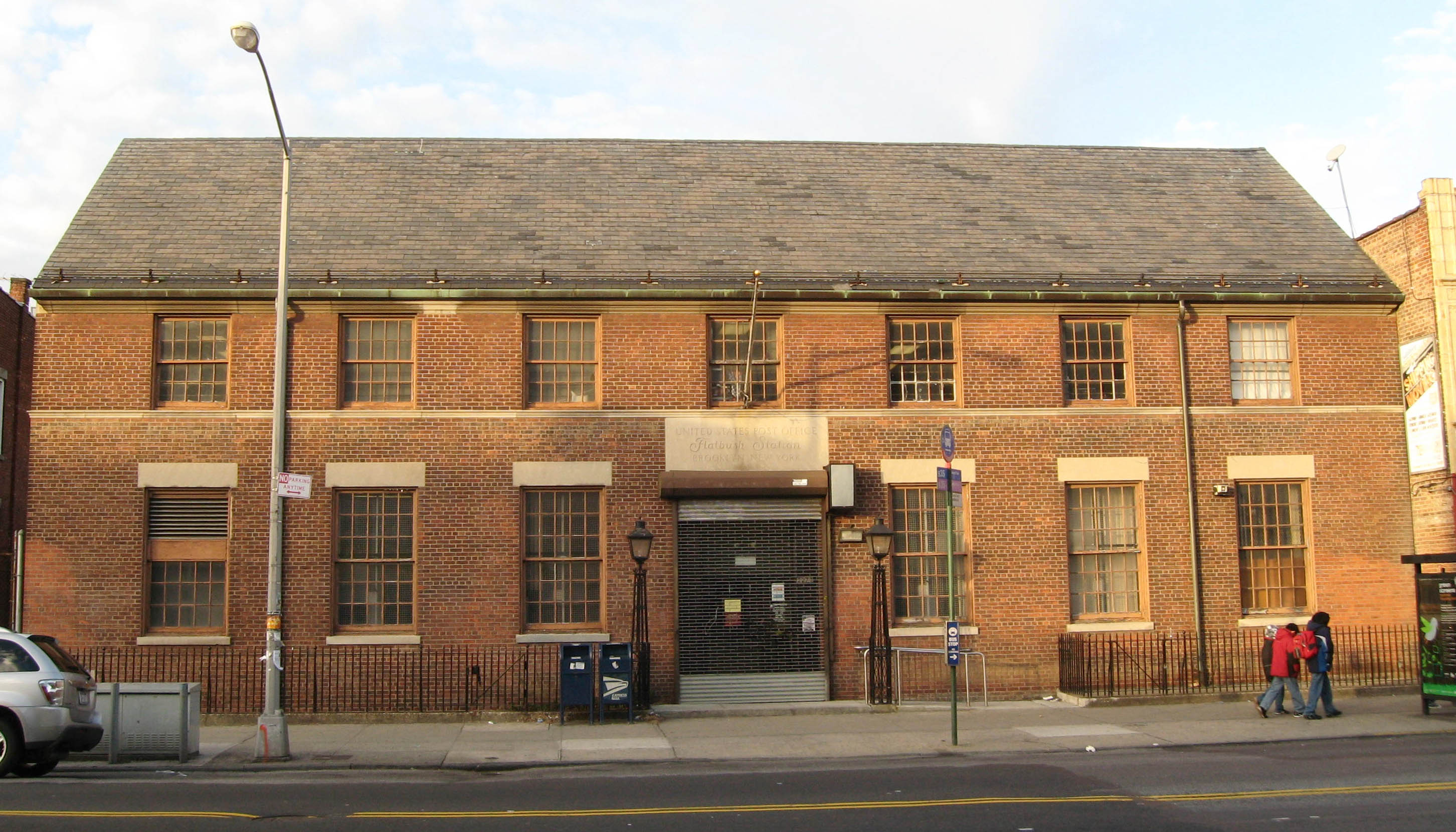
- (December 2008)

- Location within New York City Location within New York Location within the United States
- Location: 2273 Church Ave. Brooklyn, New York City
- Coordinates: 40°39′2″N 73°57′24″W
- Built: 1936
- Architect: U.S. Treasury Dept., Lorimer Rich
- Architectural style: Colonial Revival
- MPS: US Post Offices in New York State, 1858-1943, TR
- NRHP reference No.: 88002460
- NYSRHP No.: 04701.002504

Significant dates
- Added to NRHP: November 17, 1988
- Designated NYSRHP: November 17, 1988

The US Post Office - Flatbush Station is a historic post office building located at 2273 Church Avenue between Flatbush and Bedford Avenues in the Flatbush neighborhood of Brooklyn, New York City. It was built in 1936, and designed by consulting architect Lorimer Rich in the Colonial Revival style, for the Office of the Supervising Architect of the United States Department of the Treasury. The building is a symmetrical, two-story, red brick building with a gable roof and a large one-story rear wing.

It was listed on the National Register of Historic Places in 1988.

== See also ==
- National Register of Historic Places listings in Kings County, New York
