= Lap joint =

Woodworking joint

Left to right: Half lap, mitred half lap, cross lap and dovetail lap

A lap joint or overlap joint is a joint in which the members overlap. Lap joints can be used to join wood, plastic, or metal. A lap joint can be used in woodworking for joining wood together.

A lap joint may be a full lap or half lap. In a full lap, no material is removed from either of the members that will be joined, resulting in a joint which is the combined thickness of the two members. In a half lap joint or halving joint, material is removed from both of the members so that the resulting joint is the thickness of the thickest member. Most commonly in half lap joints, the members are of the same thickness and half the thickness of each is removed.

With respect to wood joinery, this joint, where two long-grain wood faces are joined with glue, is among the strongest in ability to resist shear forces, exceeding even mortise and tenon and other commonly-known "strong" joints.

With respect to metal welding, this joint, made by overlapping the edges of the plate, is not recommended for most work. The single lap has very little resistance to bending. It can be used satisfactorily for joining two cylinders that fit inside one another.

== Applications ==
- Frame assembly in cabinet making
- Temporary framing
- Some applications in timber frame construction
- Tabling

== Halving laps ==
Halving lap joints are used extensively in transition and cabinetry for framing. They are quick and easy to make and provide high strength through good long grain to long grain gluing surface. The shoulders provide some resistance to racking (diagonal distortion). They may be reinforced with dowels or mechanical fasteners to resist twisting of the wood.

== End lap ==
Also known simply as a pull lap, it is the basic form of the lap joint and is used when joining members end to end either parallel or at right angles. When the joint forms a corner, as in a rectangular frame, the joint is often called a corner lap. This is the most common form of end lap and is used most in framing.

For a half lap in which the members are parallel, the joint may be known as a half lap splice. This is a splice joint and is an alternative to scarfing when joining shorter members end to end.

Both members in an end lap have one shoulder and one cheek each.

Use for:

- Internal cabinet frames
- Visible frames when the frame members are to be shaped.

== Cross lap ==
The main difference between this and the basic half lap is that the joint occurs in the middle of one or both members, rather than at the end. The two members are at right angles to each other and one member may terminate at the joint, or it may carry on beyond it. When one of the members terminates at the shin, it is often referred to as a tee lap or middle lap. In a cross lap where both members continue beyond the joint, each member has two shoulders and one cheek.

Use for:

- Internal cabinet frames
- Simple framing and bracing

== Dovetail lap ==
This is a lap in which the housing has been cut at an angle which, resists withdrawal of the stem from the cross-piece.

Use for:

- Framing applications where tension forces could pull the joint apart

== Mitred half lap ==
The mitred half lap is the weakest version of the joint because of the reduced gluing surface.

Use for:

- Visible framing applications where a mitred corner is desired

== See also ==
- Shiplap
- Bridle joint
- Halved joint
- Scarf joint
- Splice joint
- Finger joint
