= Tanner Amphitheater =

Amphitheater in Arlington County, Virginia, U.S.

James Tanner Amphitheater
- United States
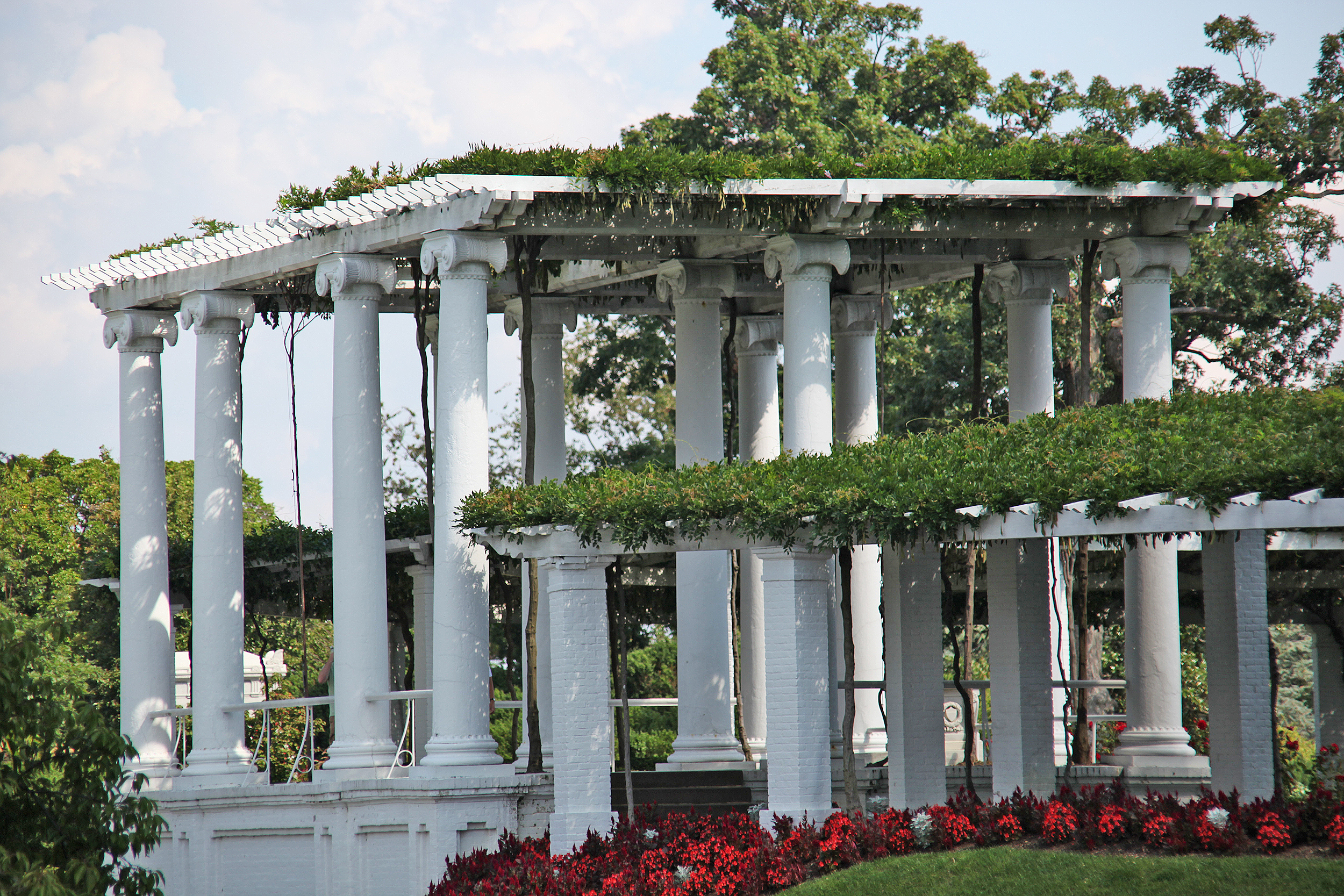
- Looking east at the dais and colonnade of Tanner Amphitheater
- For James R. Tanner, disabled American Civil War veteran and civil servant
- Unveiled: May 29, 1873; 153 years ago
- Location: 38.880255°N 77.073878°W near Arlington County, Virginia, U.S.

The James Tanner Amphitheater is a historic wood and brick amphitheater located at Arlington National Cemetery in Arlington County, Virginia, in the United States. The amphitheater, which was originally unnamed, was constructed in 1873 and served as the cemetery's main public meeting space until the completion of Memorial Amphitheater in 1920. The amphitheater was informally called the Old Amphitheater from 1920 to May 2014, when it was renamed the James R. Tanner Amphitheater in honor of James R. Tanner, a disabled American Civil War veteran and influential veterans' organization leader.

== History of the site ==
=== Construction of Arlington House and "the Grove" ===
In 1778, John Parke Custis purchased an 1,100-acre (450 ha) tract of forested land on the Potomac River north of the town of Alexandria, Virginia. This land became the Arlington Estate. John Custis died in September 1781, and in 1799 his son, George Washington Parke Custis ("G.W.P.")—foster-grandson of George Washington—inherited the site. G.W.P Custis moved onto the estate in 1802, and between 1802 and 1818 constructed Arlington House. Custis also extensively developed the estate grounds. Much of the steep slope to the east of the house became a cultivated English landscape park, while a large flower garden with an arbor was constructed and planted south of the house.

To the west of Arlington House, tall grass and low native plants led down a slope into a natural area of close-growing trees the Custises called "the Grove." Located about 60 feet (18 m) west of the flower garden, "the Grove" contained tall elm and oak trees which formed a canopy. An informal flower garden was planted beneath the trees and maintained by the Custis daughters. It is not clear when "the Grove" began to be developed, but it was under way by at least 1853.

G.W.P.'s daughter, Mary Anna Randolph Custis, married Robert E. Lee, an impoverished lieutenant in the United States Army, in June 1831. The Lees took up residence at Arlington House. Mary Custis died in 1853, and Mary Custis Lee had her buried in "the Grove". G.W.P. Custis died in October 1857, and he was buried next to his wife in "the Grove".

=== Cemetery ===
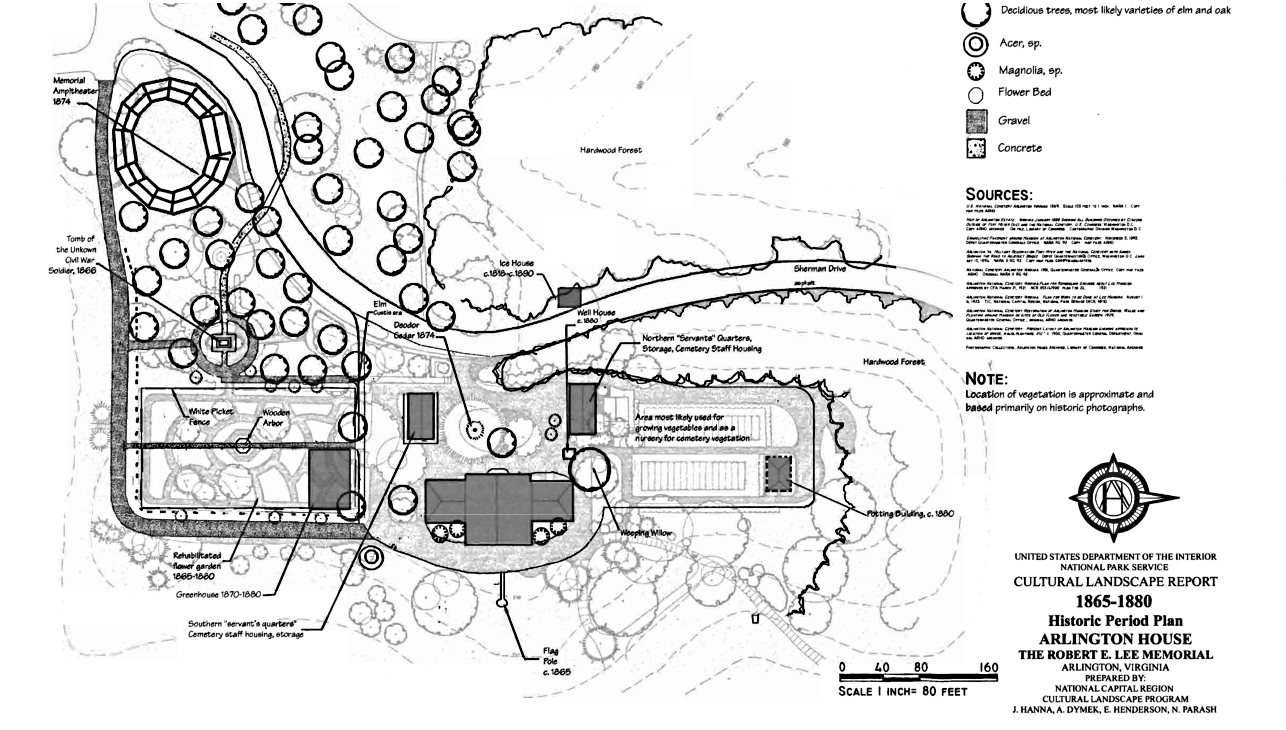
Map of the grounds of Arlington National Cemetery as they existed between 1865 and 1880. The location of the amphitheater can be seen southwest (upper-left corner) of Arlington House.

Arlington Estate's history changed forever with the outbreak of the American Civil War. Robert E. Lee resigned from the United States Army on April 20, 1861, and took command of Virginia's armed forces on April 23. Armed forces loyal to the United States ("Union" forces) realized that artillery placed on the heights of the estate would be able to shell the city of Washington at will. Aware that Union forces were likely to seize her home, Mary Custis Lee packed up most of her belongings and fled to her family estate at Ravensworth in Fairfax County, Virginia, on May 17. Union troops occupied Arlington Estate and Arlington House on May 24.

On July 16, 1862, the United States Congress passed legislation authorizing the U.S. federal government to purchase land for national cemeteries for military dead, and put the U.S. Army Quartermaster General in charge of this program. At this time, the Soldiers' Home in nearby Washington, D.C., and the Alexandria Cemetery were the primary burying grounds for war dead in the D.C. area, but by late 1863 both cemeteries were full. In May 1864, large numbers of Union forces died in the Battle of the Wilderness. Quartermaster General Montgomery C. Meigs ordered that an examination of eligible sites be made for the establishment for a large new national military cemetery. Within weeks, his staff reported that Arlington Estate was the most suitable property in the area. The estate was high and free from floods (which might unearth graves), it had a view of the District of Columbia, and it was aesthetically pleasing. It was also the home of the leader of the armed forces of the Confederate States of America, and denying Robert E. Lee use of his home after the war was a valuable political consideration. Although the first military burial at Arlington was made on May 13, Meigs did not authorize establishment of burials until June 15, 1864.

Most burials initially occurred near the freedmen's cemetery in the northeast corner of the estate. But in mid-June 1864 Meigs ordered that burials commence immediately on the grounds adjacent to Arlington House. The first officer burial had occurred next to the flower garden on May 17, but with Meigs' order another 44 officers were buried along the southern and eastern sides of this area within a month. In December 1865, Robert E. Lee's brother, Sydney Smith Lee, visited Arlington House and observed that the house could be made livable again if the graves around the flower garden were removed. Meigs hated Lee for betraying the Union, and ordered that more burials occur near the house in order to make it politically impossible for disinterment to occur.

The large number of Union troops, their need for firewood and animal fodder, and the need to construct extensive fortifications led to extensive degradation of Arlington Estate during the Civil War. By 1865, most of "the Grove" had been lost. Its flower beds and paths had been trampled out of existence by troops and pack animals, and some of its trees had been cut down.

== Design and construction of the amphitheater ==
=== Decoration Day and the need for an amphitheater ===
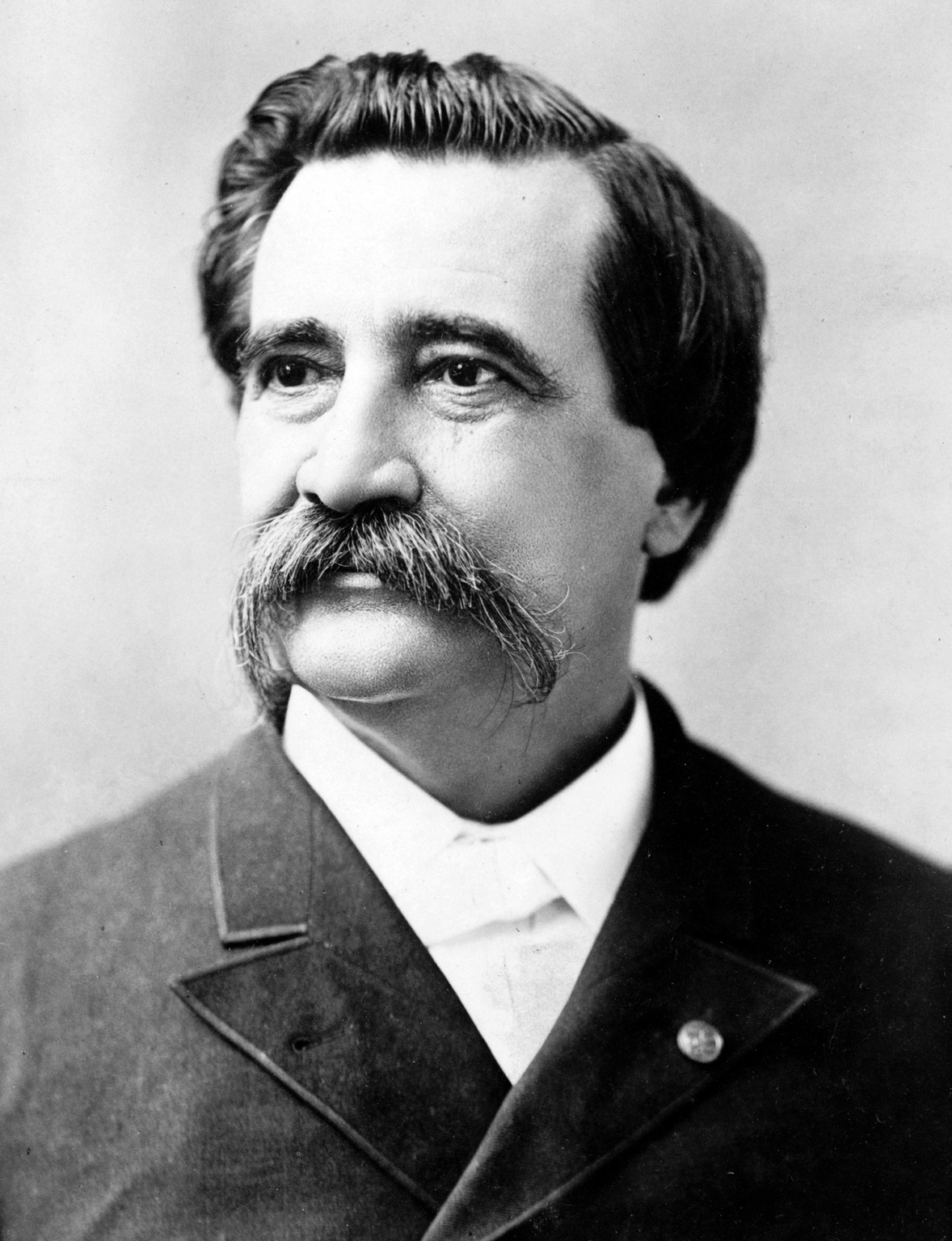
John A. Logan, who popularized Decoration Day, in 1886.

The popularity of Arlington (Note: Arlington would not become a national cemetery until 1874.) as a site for patriotic meetings and Civil War remembrance events soared after the establishment of Decoration Day (later known as Memorial Day). Spontaneous decoration of Civil War graves and the maintenance of cemeteries had occurred since the early days of the war in both the North and the South since the earliest days of the war. John A. Logan, a former major general in the Union Army, had been elected "Commander in Chief" of the Grand Army of the Republic, an organization for Union Civil War veterans. Aware of the growing acceptance of Decoration Day as a holiday, Logan issued a statement on May 5, 1868, calling for "Decoration Day" to be observed nationwide on an annual basis. Logan set the date for May 30, because it was not the anniversary of any particular battle.

The establishment of Decoration Day as an official government holiday (by proclamation, not by law) swiftly occurred, and the holiday was almost immediately a popular one. At Arlington cemetery, the number of people attending the annual event swiftly overwhelmed the limited facilities. The first Decoration Day event was held in front of Arlington House. James A. Garfield, a former Major General in the Union Army (and future President of the United States), addressed a "large crowd" from the mansion's back steps. The following year, President Ulysses S. Grant closed the federal government for the holiday, and most businesses followed, which greatly contributed to attendance at the cemetery. A dais seating 400 people was erected in what remained of "the Grove" at the rear of Arlington House to accommodate speakers and dignitaries—which, for the first time, included President Grant. The Civil War Unknowns Monument, which was located 180 feet (55 m) south-southwest of Arlington House, was covered by a canopy. Several American flags hung from the canopy, red-white-and-blue bunting was draped along the monument's top, and numerous floral tributes were laid against it. An estimated 25,000 people attended the event throughout the day. Two sites for ceremonies were used in 1870. A very large speakers' dais was erected near the Sheridan Gate and McClellan Gate on the cemetery's east side, and used for speeches throughout the day. For the more important speakers, a second dais seating 200 was erected at the rear of Arlington House (although not with "the Grove"). A stand, permitting the seating of 500, was built nearby for a grand chorus (which sang for the crowd). Again, the Civil War Unknowns Monument was canopied and decorated. About 20,000 people attended the event that year, with rain keeping the numbers low. In 1871, the speakers' dais moved back to "the Grove" and expanded to accommodate 300 people. Frederick Douglass, the former African American slave and abolitionist, was the featured speaker that year. "Hundreds" of people attended his address, including President Grant. The dais moved again in 1872, this time to a location a few yards to the south of the Civil War Unknowns Monument. The dais was slightly reduced in size so that it only sat 200, but it now included a thrust on which stood a speaker's podium. More than 5,000 people attended the 1872 event.

=== Building the amphitheater ===
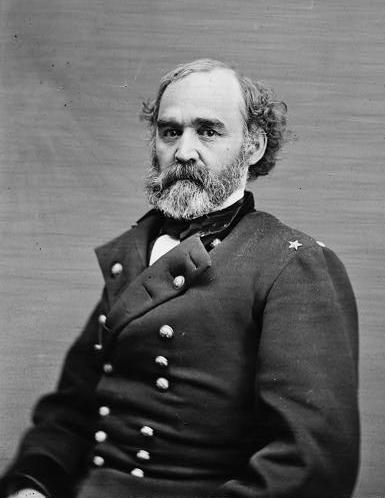
Brig. General Montgomery C. Meigs, Quartermaster General of the U.S. Army and designer of the amphitheater.

Due to the growing importance of the cemetery as well as the much larger crowds attending Memorial Day observances, General Meigs decided a large, formal amphitheater was needed at the cemetery. The site chosen was what remained of "the Grove". It was both beautiful and had spectacular panoramic views of Washington, D.C., which appealed to planners for its solemnity and inspirational qualities. The last trees of "the Grove" were cut down, and an amphitheater constructed on the cleared space. (Note: Peters mistakenly locates the amphitheater in the Arlington House garden. Peters does not say which garden, the kitchen garden north of the house or the flower garden south of it. Tanner Amphitheater is not located in either place, and Peters appears to be inaccurate regarding the amphitheater's site.)

Construction on the amphitheater began on May 2, 1873, and was complete by May 29. (Note: A number of sources, such as the Cultural Landscape Program of the National Park Service, the United States Commission of Fine Arts, and historians Owen Andrews, Philip Bigler, David Miller, Cynthia Parzych, and Robert Poole all assert that the date of completion was 1874. But primary source documents, such as construction records cited by the Historic American Buildings Survey and the 1873 article in The Evening Star, clearly show the date of completion to be May 29, 1873. Historian James Edward Peters claims the amphitheater was completed in 1868, in time for the first Decoration Day, but that is clearly in error.)

The Arlington cemetery amphitheater was designed by Meigs, who in addition to being Quartermaster General was also an excellent engineer and architect. The enclosing structure was a pergola, a popular structure in American gardens in the 1800s. Why Meigs chose a pergola is not clear. According to the Historic American Buildings Survey (HABS), "There is no substantial evidence as to Meigs' intentions regarding the amphitheater." Nonetheless, HABS argues, Meigs undoubtedly was influenced by garden cemetery movement, and the pergola fit with this design aesthetic.

Rushed into construction, a work group consisting of 23 carpenters, 12 bricklayers, and 30 general laborers built the amphitheater in just 28 days. A "Colonel Curtis" oversaw the work, under the supervision of General William Myers (the quartermaster in charge of the Washington, D.C., quartermaster's depot). A bowl was dug in the earth and the removed soil used to create a 4-foot (1.2 m) high berm on which the pergola was erected. Excavation work was accomplished by contractor Harvey Bell. Bricklaying was done by the firm of Carroll & Shaw, and the carpentry work by contractor D.J. McCarty. Plastering, stuccoing, and painting of the pergola columns was done by contractor Joseph Beckert, while painting of the wooden trellis was accomplished by James Hudson. Sod was provided by Harvey Bell. At the time of its completion, no shrubs, trees, or vines had yet been planted at the amphitheater. A dais in the northern side of the amphitheater provided a platform for speakers and guests. The dais supported 12 round, smooth columns. To reinforce the dais and the trellis above it, the A. Schneider firm made and affixed metal braces. The dais columns were topped by Ionic capitals. The double base consisted of a two-stepped, round base with egg-and-dart decoration, below which was a simple square plinth. The capitals and bases were made of cast iron, and manufactured by James Hudson.

== History of the amphitheater ==
The amphitheater was first used on May 30, 1873, for Decoration Day ceremonies. Present for the amphitheater's inauguration were President Grant, Secretary of State Hamilton Fish, Secretary of War William W. Belknap, Secretary of the Treasury William Adams Richardson, Attorney General George Henry Williams, and Frederick Douglass. The Reverend Thomas De Witt Talmage, D.D., one of the great public orators of the day, addressed the crowd. That same year, Meigs hired trained landscape gardener David H. Rhodes to oversee the beautification of the cemetery with plants. Rhodes quickly planted wisteria vines and leafy green shrubs around the columns of the pergola and wisteria below the columns of the dais. By May 1876, the wisteria covered almost the entire structure.

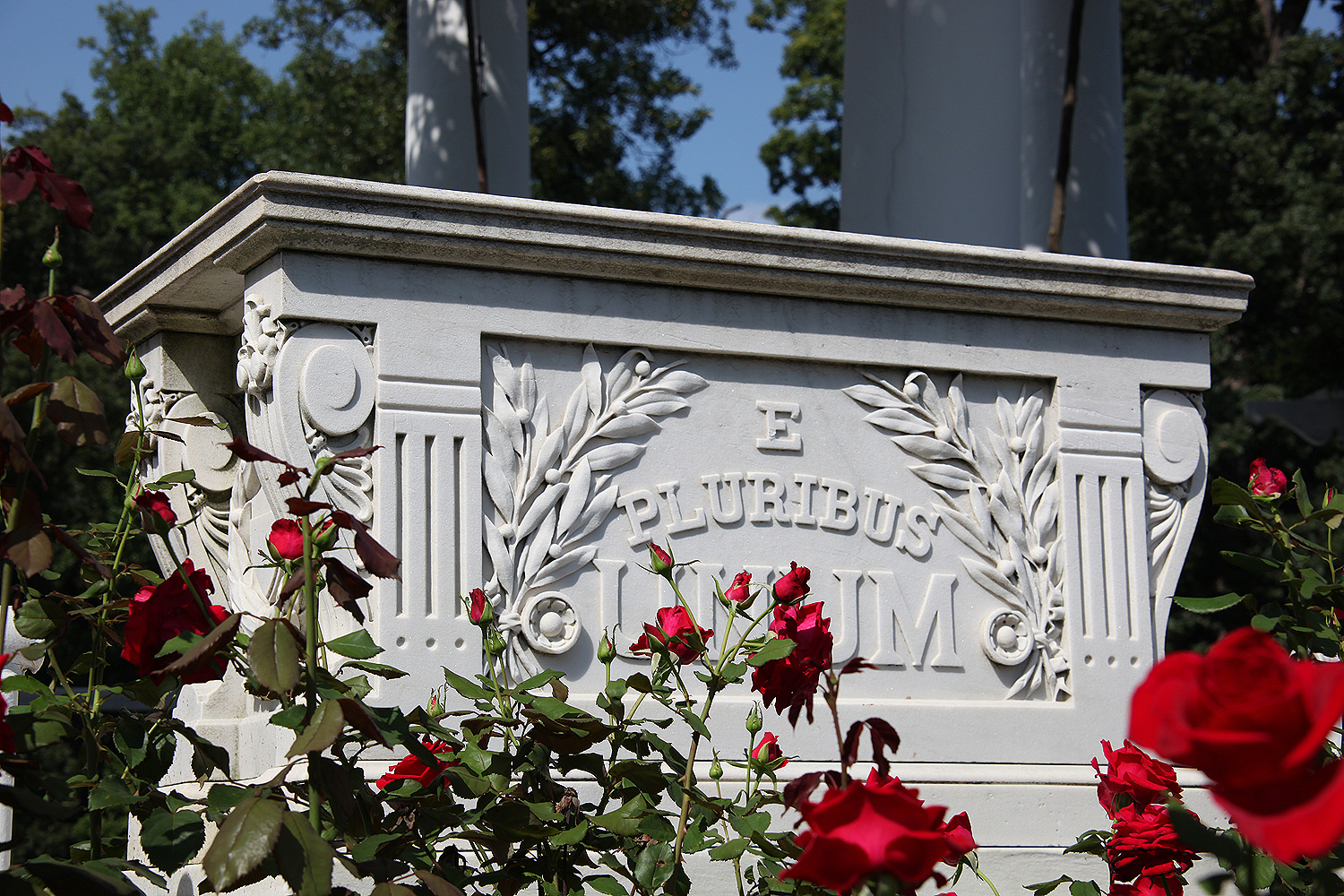
The face of the Rostrum.

Meigs intended for an awning of sorts to cover the amphitheater bowl to provide protection from hot sun or rain. Canvas awnings (whose description, method of erection, and use are not known) were employed on Decoration Day in 1874, but came loose in the wind and were greatly disliked by people attending the ceremonies. A second set of awnings were constructed for use in time for the 1875 Decoration Day. Manufactured by M.G. Copeland (who both cut and fit them to the pergola), these blue-and-white striped awnings (made of an unidentified material) were attached to the trellis above the dais and sections of the trellis around the amphitheater. But these, too, proved difficult to control in wind, which blew them around when not properly tied down. The striped awnings were replaced in 1877 by a tent-like canopy. Manufactured by sailmaker Charles Lawrence of Philadelphia, the new covering was made of duck canvas and covered both the dais and the amphitheater's grassy bowl. Designed by Meigs, this tent-like structure was supported by two poles erected inside the ellipse. Long ropes passed over and through the trellises and were attached to stakes driven into the earth outside the amphitheater. Lawrence supplied the tent, while the federal government supplied the rope, stakes, and poles. The canopy was first used on Decoration Day 1878, and on many occasions thereafter.

A marble speaker's podium, known as the "Rostrum" (and sometimes as the "Altar"), was added to the dais in 1880. The Rostrum was designed by prominent D.C. architect John L. Smithmeyer (who later co-designed the main building of the Library of Congress). Just 5.3 feet (1.6 m) in length and 4.3 feet (1.3 m) high, the ends featured a modified blank Swiss escutcheon surrounded by a wreath, while the front was emblazoned with palm fronds and the Latin phrase "E Pluribus Unum" (from many, one). The Rostrum was physically sculpted by the firm of William Struthers & Sons of Philadelphia, Pennsylvania, and was delivered just before Decoration Day in May 1880.

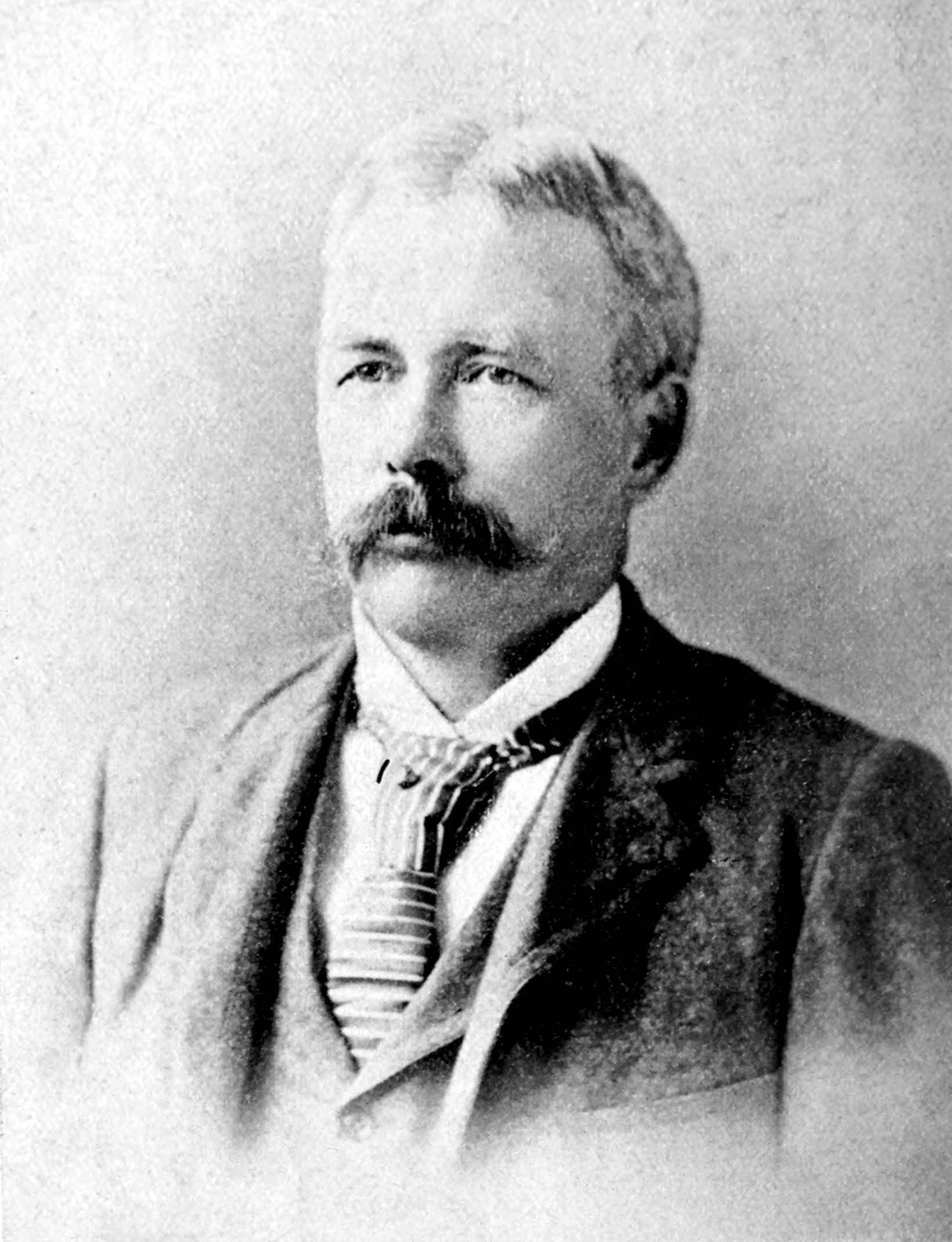
James Tanner, Civil War veteran, and veterans activist

=== Replacement structure ===
By 1900, crowds at events at Arlington National Cemetery were too large to be accommodated by the amphitheater. A larger structure was clearly needed. Judge Ivory Kimball, Commander of the Department of the Potomac chapter of the Grand Army of the Republic, believed that not only should a new and larger facility be built, but also that the new amphitheater memorialize the dead of all wars in which the nation had fought. Kimball and the GAR began their push for a new amphitheater in 1903, but legislation failed to pass for the next five years. Legislation authorizing the establishment of a memorial was finally enacted in 1908, but almost no funding was provided for the amphitheater's design and none for its construction. In 1912, legislation was introduced by Senator George Sutherland to authorize construction of a 5,000-seat memorial amphitheater. Prospects for passage initially seemed dim. But during the third session of the 62nd Congress, a number of new federal memorials were approved, including the Arlington Memorial Bridge, the Lincoln Memorial, a memorial to women who served in the Civil War (now the American Red Cross National Headquarters), and a George Washington memorial auditorium. The successful push for new memorials helped supporters win passage of legislation authorizing construction of Memorial Amphitheater. President William Howard Taft, in one of his last acts as president, signed the legislation into law on March 4, 1913.

Construction proceeded swiftly despite the pressure on funding and resources imposed by World War I, and Memorial Amphitheater was dedicated on May 15, 1920.

=== Renaming ===
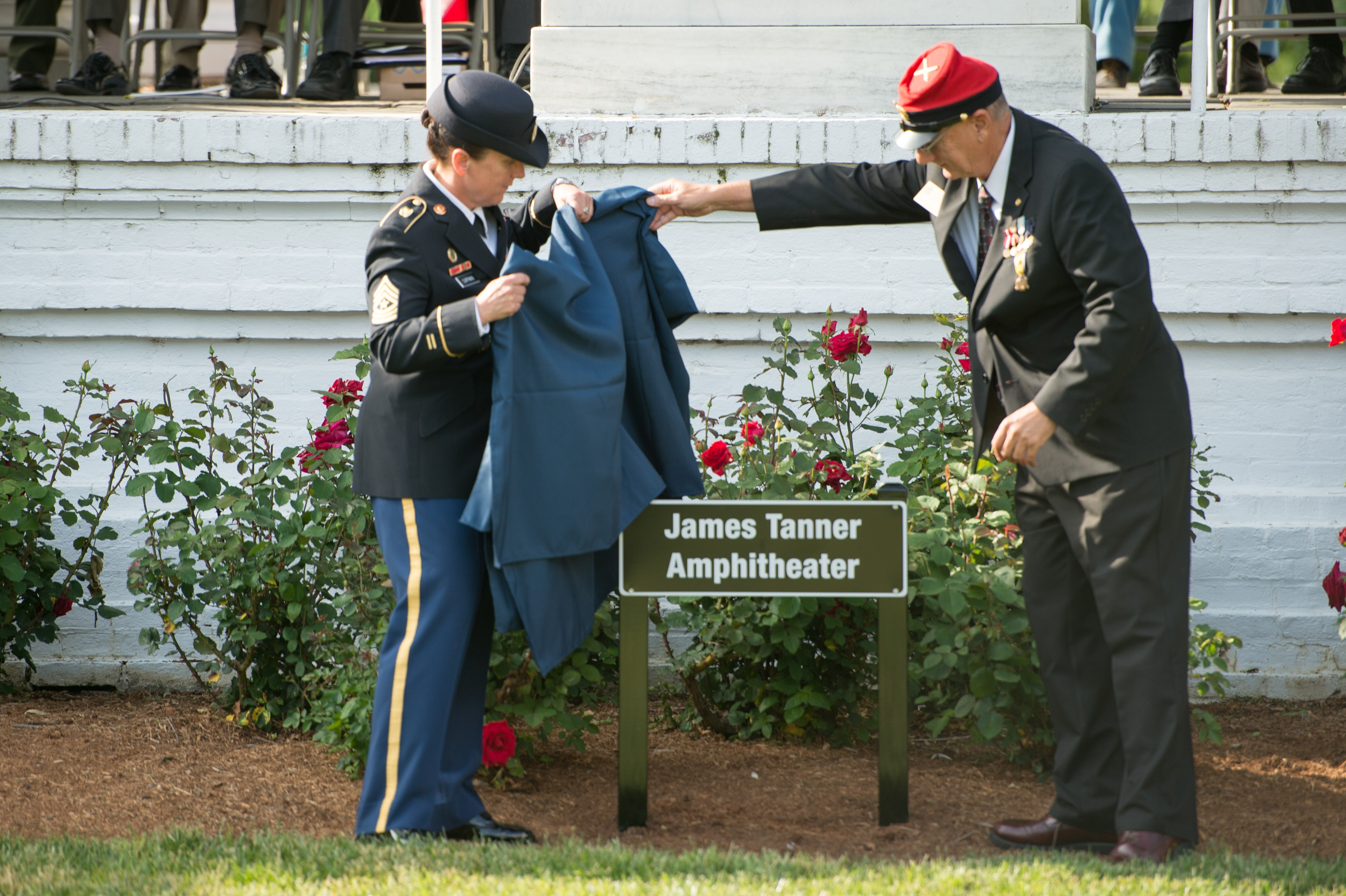
Unveiling of the plaque at the renamed Tanner Amphitheater on May 30, 2014.

With the construction of Memorial Amphitheater, the older structure came to be known informally as the Old Amphitheater.

In 2014, Arlington National Cemetery officials dedicated the Old Amphitheater as the James Tanner Amphitheater. James R. Tanner, a Union Army veteran, lost both legs during the American Civil War. He became a stenographer and clerk with the United States Department of War, and took down most of the eyewitness testimony during the early hours of the investigation into the assassination of Abraham Lincoln. Tanner is buried a few yards from the amphitheater which now bears his name. The amphitheater's new name was unveiled at a ceremony on May 29, 2014.

== About Tanner Amphitheater ==
No architectural plans or drawings for the 1873 structure exist. The earliest plans for Tanner Amphitheater are those drawn by General Meigs in 1877 (apparently for the use of canopy-maker Charles Lawrence).

Tanner Amphitheater consists of an elliptical wooden colonnade built on a 4-foot (1.2 m) high berm, with a bowl-shaped depression in the middle. The amphitheater is oriented to the north, where a dais and speaker's rostrum are placed. The exterior dimensions of the amphitheater are 118 by 139 feet (36 by 42 m), while the interior dimensions are 68 by 96 feet (21 by 29 m). The north–south intercolumnation (Note: Intercolumnation is the space between the columns.) is 12.7 feet (3.9 m), while the east–west intercolumnation is 10.4 feet (3.2 m). The width of the middle bay on each side of the ellipse is 17.4 feet (5.3 m). The dais is rectangular in shape, and 41.5 by 28.5 feet (12.6 by 8.7 m) in size.

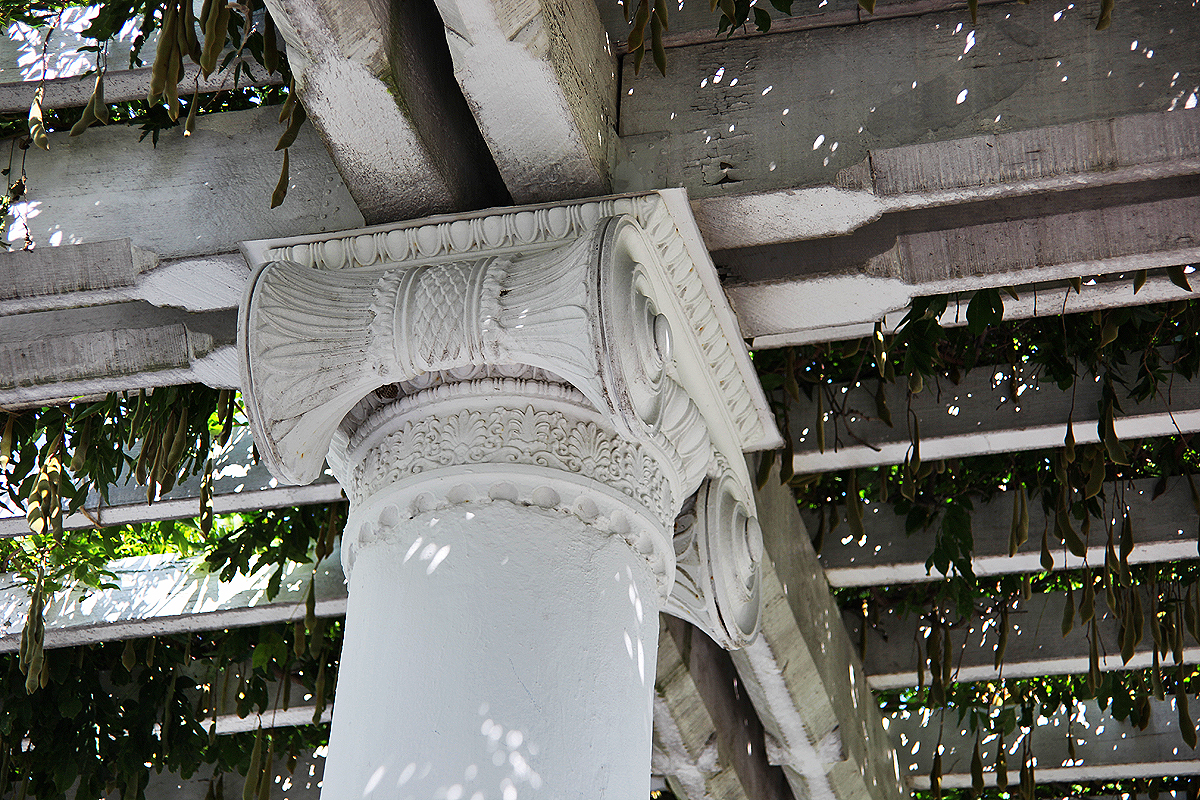
Detail of the trellis above the dais, showing the cast iron Ionic capitals, double-girder bolted beams, and cross-braces.

The amphitheater's colonnade is formed by three concentric rings of 46 square brick columns. Each column is approximately 2 feet (0.61 m) on a side. The base of each column is a brick square slightly larger than the column. A wooden Doric capital tops each brick column. The top of each capital is protected by zinc and tin flashing. The colonnade is topped by a 25-foot (7.6 m) wide trellis. The trellis consists of beams made of 2-by-6-inch (5.1 by 15.2 cm) wooden planks, set upright on their short ends. Joists made of 2-by-6es are set perpendicular to the planks. The joists are connected to the planks by halved joints. The joists project about 1-foot (0.30 m) beyond the beams on both ends. The bottom of each projection is carved into a dentil decorative shape. There are roughly 12 joists between each column. Running parallel and between each beam is a second 2-by-6 joist attached with halved joints to the top of the beam-perpendicular joists. The floor of the colonnade between the outer and middle trellis columns consists of grey granite rectangular slabs set into the soil.

Tanner Amphitheater is oriented toward the dais on the north side of the structure. The dais is 41.5 feet (12.6 m) wide and 28.5 feet (8.7 m) deep, and is large enough to seat 300 people. The dais is constructed of brick, with decorative blind corbel arches on all four sides. A four-tread set of stone steps provides access on the east and west sides. Twelve smooth, round columns, made of brick, support a trellis overhead. Each column is topped by an Ionic capital. Each column has a two-stepped, round base with egg-and-dart decoration, below which is a simple square plinth. The capitals and bases are made of cast iron, and the brick columns clad in smooth stucco. The trellis above the dais is formed by beams, which are made of two 2-by-12-inch (5.1 by 30.5 cm) planks bolted together. Two beams form a girder. Girders run east and west and north and south, connecting all the columns together. Joists made of 2-by-12-inch (5.1 by 30.5 cm) planks connected to the top of the girders with halved joints. These joists form most of the trellis structure on which plants climb. There are six joists between each east–west column, and one between each north–south column. The deck of the dais consists of stone pavers over fill earth. A low, simple, wrought-iron railing surrounds the dais on the east, west, and north sides.

All the wood, brick, stucco, and iron which make up Tanner Amphitheater are painted white.

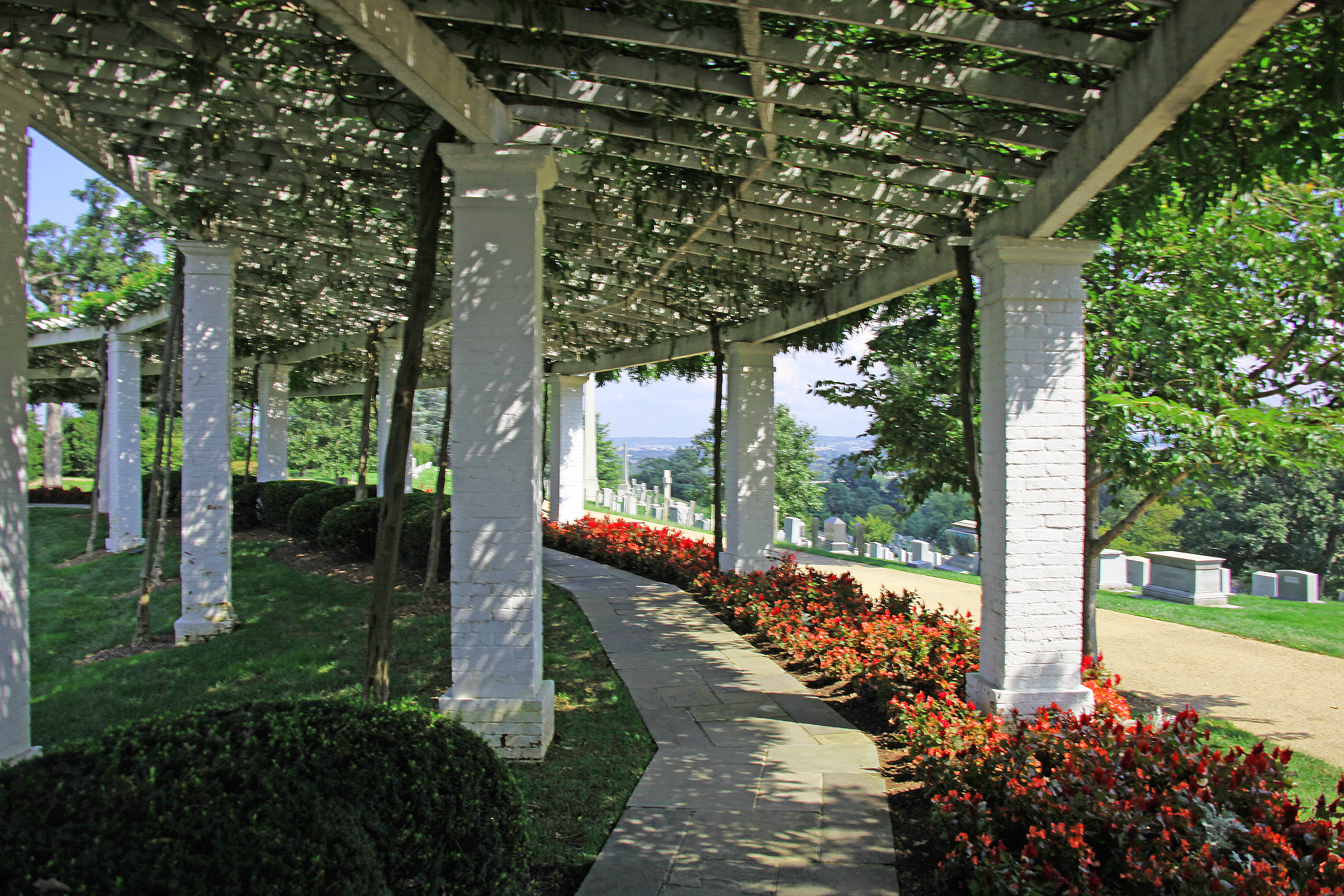
Landscaping below the colonnade trellis.

Tanner Amphitheater is extensively landscaped. Sod surrounds the amphitheater and lines the bowl. Originally, wisteria and various kinds of grape and other vines were planted at the base of the columns. These covered the trellis thickly. Although most of the vines have been removed, the wisteria remains. Between the inner and middle trellis columns are planted low boxwood hedges. Planting beds of flowers and flowering shrubs ring the amphitheater.

Tanner Amphitheater has a seating capacity of 1,500 when tightly packed wooden folding chairs are used.

As of 1995, Tanner Amphitheater was in good but slightly deteriorated condition. Settling of the dais caused the north edge to bow out, and the century-old brickwork was deteriorating in several places. Pieces had fallen from some of the cast iron capitals, and not been replaced.

Some parts of Tanner Amphitheater have required replacement over the years. Three columns in the colonnade were severely damaged when a tree fell against them, and had to be replaced with new brick columns. Their cast iron capitals were too damaged to reuse, and were replaced with cast concrete capitals. The wood in the trellis has also been replaced through the years, as needed.

=== Aesthetic assessment ===
The Historic American Buildings Survey has a positive aesthetic assessment of Tanner Amphitheater. Its pergola design fits well with and enhances the setting in which it is situated, the organization says, while the Neoclassical style of the columns and Rostrum bring to mind the values of strength, simplicity, and democracy. Tanner Amphitheater fit well with and reinforced the bucolic, pastoral nature of Arlington National Cemetery in the 1800s. The new amphitheater, however, signaled a reorientation of the cemetery toward a monumental, dominating style. As historian Peter Andrews put it, Arlington "ceased to be a pastoral, semiprivate resting ground for the career military and instead became a national shrine."

Tanner Amphitheater has also proved influential. The Historic American Buildings Survey, in their architectural study of the old amphitheater, points out that Memorial Amphitheater clearly mimics Tanner Amphitheater with its elliptical design, colonnade, and dais with rostrum.

== Bibliography ==
- Andrews, Owen (1994). A Moment of Silence: Arlington National Cemetery. Indianapolis, Ind.: Wiley. ISBN 9780891332237.
- Andrews, Peter (1966). In Honored Glory: The Story of Arlington. New York: G.P. Putnams Sons.
- Arlington Memorial Amphitheater Commission (1923). Final Report of the Arlington Memorial Amphitheater Commission. Washington, D.C.: Government Printing Office. hdl:2027/mdp.39015020241660.
- Atkinson, Rick (2007). Where Valor Rests: Arlington National Cemetery. Washington, D.C.: National Geographic Society. ISBN 9781426200892.
- Bigler, Philip (1986). In Honored Glory: Arlington National Cemetery, the Final Post. Arlington, Va.: Vandamere Press. ISBN 0918339057.
- Byrne, Karen (October 2002). "Our Little Sanctuary in the Woods: Spiritual Life at Arlington Chapel". Arlington Historical Magazine: 38–44.
- Chase, Enoch Aquila (1930). "The Arlington Case: George Washington Custis Lee Against the United States of America". Records of the Columbia Historical Society: 175–207.
- Cohen, Hennig; Coffin, Tristram Potter (1991). The Folklore of American Holidays. Detroit: Gale Research. ISBN 0810376024.
- Corfield, Justin (2009). "Arlington National Cemetery". In Pencak, William (ed.). Encyclopedia of the Veteran in America. Volume 1. Santa Barbara, Calif.: ABC-CLIO. ISBN 9780313340093.
- Cultural Landscape Program (2001). Arlington House: The Robert E. Lee Memorial Cultural Landscape Report (PDF) (Report). Washington, D.C.: National Capital Region, National Park Service. Archived from the original (PDF) on July 3, 2007.
- Eicher, David J. (2002) [1997]. Robert E. Lee: A Life Portrait. Dallas: Taylor Publishing Co. ISBN 0878339507.
- Historic American Buildings Survey (1995). Arlington National Cemetery, Old Amphitheater. Lee and Sherman Drives, Arlington National Cemetery, Arlington County, Virginia. HABS No. VA-1348-A (PDF) (Report). Washington, D.C.: National Park Service.
- Jabbour, Alan; Jabbour, Karen Singer (2010). Decoration Day in the Mountains: Traditions of Cemetery Decoration in the Southern Appalachians. Chapel Hill, N.C.: University of North Carolina Press. ISBN 9780807833971.
- Loth, Calder (1999). The Virginia Landmarks Register. Charlottesville, Va.: University Press of Virginia. ISBN 0813918626.
- McCaslin, Richard B. (2004). Lee in the Shadow of Washington. Baton Rouge: Louisiana State University Press. ISBN 0807126969.
- Miller, David W. (2000). Second Only to Grant: Quartermaster General Montgomery C. Meigs. Shippensburg, Pa.: White Maine Books. ISBN 1572492120.
- Parzych, Cynthia (2009). Arlington National Cemetery. Guilford, Conn.: GPP Travel. ISBN 9780762753291.
- Peters, James Edward (2000). Arlington National Cemetery, Shrine to America's Heroes. Bethesda, Md.: Woodbine House. ISBN 1890627143.
- Poole, Robert M. (2009). On Hallowed Ground: The Story of Arlington National Cemetery. New York: Walker & Co. ISBN 9780802715487.
- United States Commission of Fine Arts (1965). Report of the Commission of Fine Arts, 1 July 1958 to 30 June 1963. Washington, D.C.: U.S. Government Printing Office.
