= Splice joint =

Woodworking joint

A splice joint is a method of joining two members end to end in woodworking. The splice joint is used when the material being joined is not available in the length required. It is an alternative to other joints such as the butt joint and the scarf joint. Splice joints are stronger than unreinforced butt joints and have the potential to be stronger than a scarf joint.

Splices are therefore most often used when structural elements are required in longer lengths than the available material. The most common form of the splice joint is the half lap splice, which is common in building construction, where it is used to join shorter lengths of timber into longer beams.

== Applications ==
- Joining structural members end to end

== Types of splice joints ==
Half lap splice, bevel lap splice and tabled splice joint

There are four main types of splice joints: half lap, bevel lap, tabled, and tapered finger.

=== Half lap splice joint ===
The half lap splice joint is the simplest form of the splice joint and is commonly used to join structural members where either great strength is not required or reinforcement, such as mechanical fasteners, are to be used.

The joint is cut as for a half lap.

=== Bevel lap splice joint ===
The bevel lap is a variation of the half-lap in which the cheeks of the opposing members are cut at an angle of 5 to 10 degrees, sloping back away from the end of the member, so that some resistance to tension is introduced. This helps to prevent the members from being pulled apart.

=== Tabled splice joint ===
A wedged tabled splice joint

The tabled splice joint is another variation of the half lap. The cheeks are cut with interlocking surfaces so that when brought together the joint resists being pulled apart.

=== Tapered finger splice joint ===
The tapered finger splice joint requires a series of matching 'fingers' or interlocking markings to be cut on the ends of opposing members. The joint is brought together and glued, with the fingers providing substantial glue surface.

This joint is commonly used in the production of building materials from smaller offcuts of timber. It is commonly found in skirting, architrave, and fascia.

The joint is usually made by machine.
