= James R. Tanner =

Union Army soldier, lawyer, politician (1844–1927)

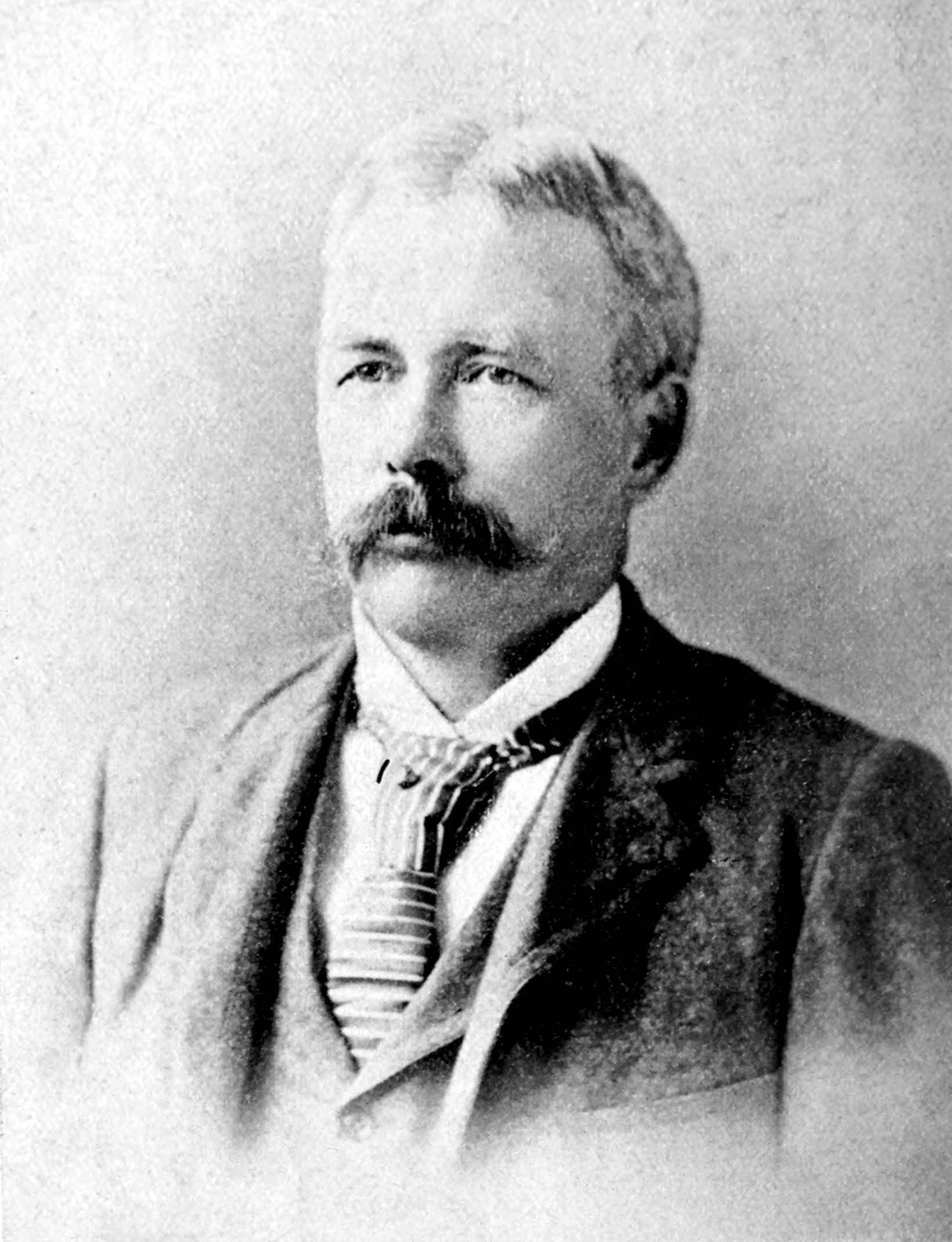
- Tanner in 1895

16th United States Commissioner of Pensions
- In office March 27, 1889 – October 18, 1889
- President: Benjamin Harrison
- Preceded by: John C. Black
- Succeeded by: Green Berry Raum

Personal details
- Born: April 4, 1844 Richmondville, New York, U.S.
- Died: October 2, 1927 (aged 83) Washington, D.C., U.S.
- Resting place: Arlington National Cemetery; Arlington, Virginia
- Occupation: civil servant
- Known for: Stenographer at the deathbed of Abraham Lincoln, incorporator of the American Red Cross

Military service
- Allegiance: United States
- Branch/service: United States Army; Union Army
- Years of service: 1861–1862
- Rank: Corporal, USV
- Unit: 87th N.Y. Vol. Infantry Reg.
- Battles/wars: American Civil War; Peninsula campaign; Siege of Yorktown; Battle of Williamsburg; Battle of Seven Pines; Seven Days Battles; Battle of Malvern Hill; Northern Virginia campaign; Battle of Thoroughfare Gap; Manassas Station; Second Battle of Bull Run

James R. Tanner (April 4, 1844 – October 2, 1927) was an American soldier and civil servant. He is best known for having lost both his legs below the knee at the Second Battle of Bull Run. Serving during the rest of the war as a government stenographer, he was present at the death of Abraham Lincoln and took notes that are the most comprehensive record of the events of the President's assassination. He later served as the United States Commissioner of Pensions, and helped reorganize and incorporate the American Red Cross.

== Early life and military career ==
Tanner was born on a farm near Richmondville, New York, on April 4, 1844. He worked on the farm most of the year and was educated in the local public schools, graduating from high school at the age of 16. He took courses at a business school for a year, and then taught public school for a few months in a neighboring school district.

Tanner was just 17 years old when the American Civil War broke out in April 1861. He enlisted in Company C of the 87th New York Volunteer Infantry Regiment, and was quickly promoted to corporal. (The title "Corporal" stuck with him for the rest of his life as a nickname.) He saw action in the Peninsula Campaign (March–July 1862), fighting at the Siege of Yorktown (April 5 to May 4, 1862), the Battle of Williamsburg (May 5, 1862), the Battle of Seven Pines (May 31 –June 1, 1862), the Seven Days Battles (June 25 to July 1, 1862), and the Battle of Malvern Hill (July 1, 1862). He then saw action at the Battle of Thoroughfare Gap (August 28, 1862), the Battle of Bristoe Station (August 26, 1862), and the Battle of Manassas Station (August 27, 1862). The last time he saw action was at the Second Battle of Bull Run, August 28–30, 1862. As Confederate artillery shelled his unit's position on August 30, shrapnel tore off his left foot and shattered his left leg below the knee. Union surgeons amputated both legs about 4 inches (10 cm) below the knee.

With the Union army in retreat, Tanner was left behind to be cared for by a local farmer's family. He was captured by Confederate forces. Paroled after 10 days, he spent several weeks recovering in Fairfax Seminary Hospital before being sent home to New York. He learned to walk with artificial limbs. For his service and injuries, he received a Civil War Pension.

== Civil wartime service ==
Tanner won a position as deputy doorkeeper for the New York State Assembly, then worked in a variety of positions of increasing responsibility for the next few months. During this time, he learned stenography.

In October 1864, Tanner won an appointment as a clerk and stenographer in the Ordnance Department in Washington, D.C. On April 14, 1865, he was summoned to the Petersen House where Abraham Lincoln lay dying from an assassin's bullet. During the night, Tanner took the testimony of eyewitnesses to the assassination, and he was present in the room when Lincoln died at 7:22 A.M. on April 15.

== Post-war career ==
Tanner left the Ordnance Department in December 1865 and moved back to Richmondville, New York. He took a job as a clerk of a committee in the state legislature, studied law with Judge William C. Lamont, and was admitted to the bar in 1869. He married Mero L. White, daughter of Alfred C. White of Jefferson, New York, in 1866. The couple had two sons (James A. and Earle W.) and two daughters (Ada and Antoinette).

Very active in Republican politics, Tanner won a patronage position as a clerk in the New York Custom House in New York City in 1869. He was promoted to deputy customs collector and served for four years under Chester A. Arthur, the Collector of the Port.

Tanner ran for a seat in the New York State Assembly in 1871, but lost in what many considered were fraudulent elections. He ran for registrar of deeds and wills in Kings County, New York, in 1876, but lost again.

In November 1877, Tanner was appointed tax collector for the city of Brooklyn, New York. He held the position for eight years. He allowed citizens to pay their taxes by mail, which was a major innovation at the time. Under Tanner, annual tax collections rose from $400,000 to $2 million a year. In 1884, he ran for sheriff, but was again defeated. The election of a Democratic city administration in 1886 forced him from office, and he became a popular public speaker on the chataqua circuit.

Tanner was frequently called on to lobby Congress on behalf of veterans and made many speeches in favor of Benjamin Harrison's presidential candidacy. Tanner was appointed Commissioner of Pensions on March 23, 1889. He supervised the operations of the Bureau of Pensions for just five months, however. His willingness to hire disabled veterans rather than party hacks and his desire to "treat the boys liberally" and loosen rules so that veterans could more easily qualify for pensions led to an investigation by Secretary of the Interior John Willock Noble, Tanner's superior. President Harrison then requested his resignation. He resigned on September 12, 1889. Leaving government service a second time, Tanner opened a legal practice dedicated to helping veterans win pension claims against the federal government.

From 1889 until 1904, Tanner was a private pension attorney engaged in prosecuting various claims against the government. In January 1894, his legs were amputated a second time in an attempt to reduce the extreme pain from which he suffered.

President Theodore Roosevelt appointed Tanner to be Register of Wills for the District of Columbia in April 1904. He held the position until his death.

== Work with veterans' organizations and Red Cross ==
Tanner became a member of the Grand Army of the Republic (GAR) shortly after it formed. The organization was a fraternal association for military veterans who had served in Union armies during the Civil War. His fame as a disabled veteran and witness to the Lincoln assassination made him popular among GAR members, and in 1876 they elected him Commander of the New York state organization. Many attempts had been made in the previous decade to create an old soldiers' home in the state, but none of these efforts bore any fruit. Tanner was determined to see one built by the state. He enlisted the help of the Reverend Henry Ward Beecher, a noted abolitionist and firebrand preacher, and held an organizing meeting in Brooklyn which raised $13,000 ($393,047). Tanner then criss-crossed the state numerous times, making speeches and holding rallies. Tanner's efforts were so successful that in 1879 the New York State Legislature appropriated money for a 600-bed Soldiers' Home in Bath, New York. He later successfully campaigned for a home for Confederate veterans in Richmond, Virginia.

Tanner was elected National Commander of the GAR in 1905. In 1912, the United Daughters of the Confederacy invited him to the ceremony for the laying of the cornerstone for the Confederate Memorial in Arlington National Cemetery. Such was his fame that he was asked on the spot to deliver short remarks to the assembled Confederate veterans (even though he was not scheduled to speak).

Tanner was also a member of the Union Veteran Legion, and was elected national commander of that association as well.

Tanner was also active in the American Red Cross. Clara Barton founded the organization in 1881 and led it for almost a quarter century. But by the early 1900s, Barton's leadership had devolved into a cult of personality and the organization's finances were in severe straits. Barton was forced out, and new leadership established a more professional and bureaucratic organization. Among those elected to the Red Cross' board of directors was James Tanner. Tanner worked assiduously to win a Congressional charter for the reorganized American Red Cross, which was granted in 1904. Tanner later served on the organization's central committee and its executive committee.

== Death ==
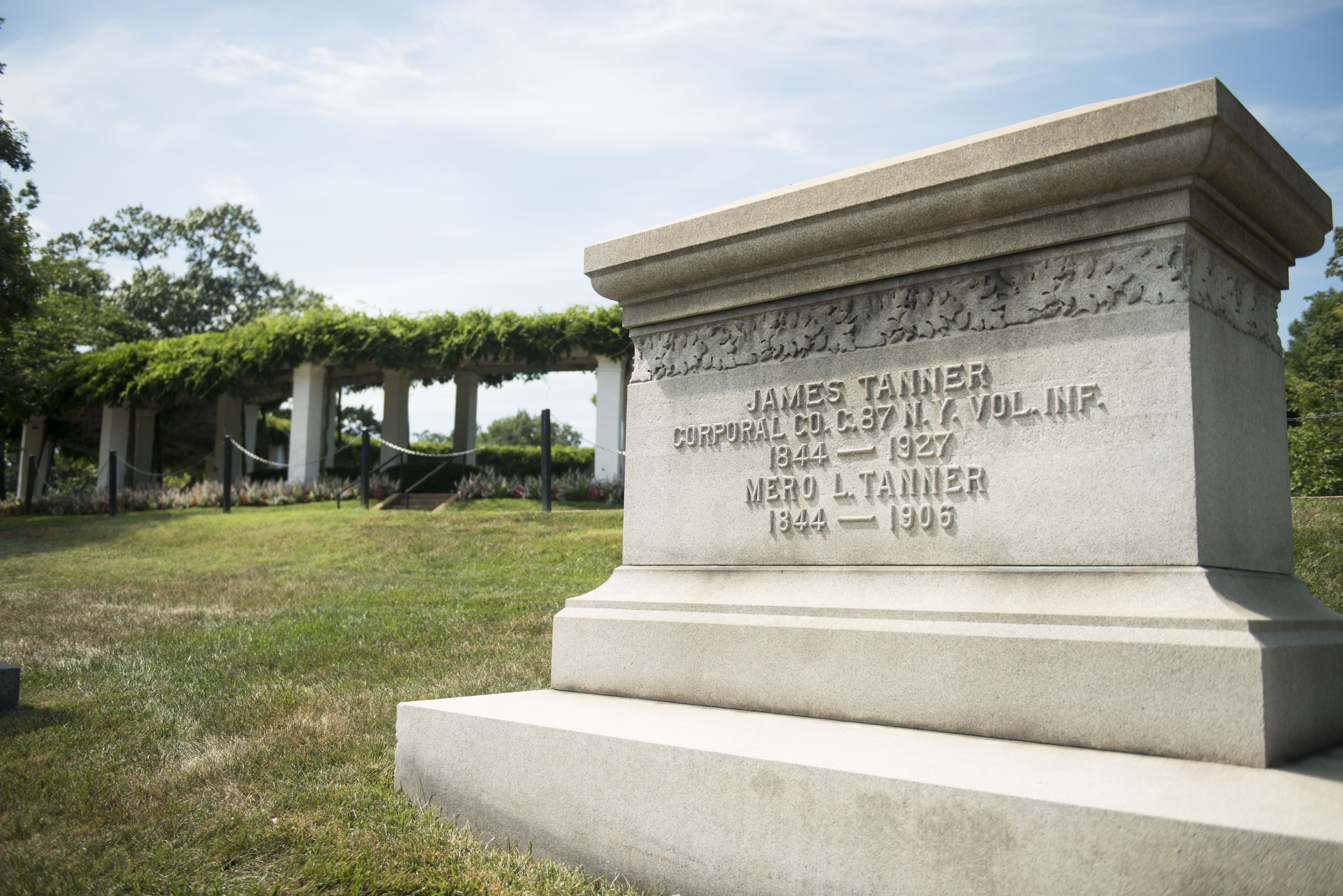
Tanner's grave in Arlington National Cemetery is near the amphitheater named for him in May 2014.

Tanner died on October 2, 1927, in Washington, D.C. He was buried at Arlington National Cemetery near Washington, D.C.

== Legacy ==
In May 2014, cemetery officials formally redesignated the Old Amphitheater as the James Tanner Amphitheater. Tanner is buried in Section 2, Grave 877, near the amphitheater.

== Bibliography ==
- Marten, James. America's Corporal: James Tanner in War and Peace (2014) excerpt and text search
- Jones, Marian Moser (2013). The American Red Cross From Clara Barton to the New Deal. Baltimore, Maryland: Johns Hopkins University Press. ISBN 9781421407388.
- Smith, James E. (1892). A Famous Battery and Its Campaigns, 1861–'64. Washington, D.C.: W.H. Lowdermilk & Co. "A Famous Battery and Its Campaigns, 1861–'64."
- White, Thomas; White, Samuel (1895). Ancestral Chronological Record of the William White Family, From 1607–8 to 1895. Concord, Mass.: Republican Press. p. 1. "Ancestral Chronological Record of the William White Family, From 1607–8 to 1895."

Political offices
Preceded by John C. Black	United States Commissioner of Pensions; March 27, 1889 – October 18, 1889	Succeeded by Green Berry Raum
