= Halved joint =

Woodworking joint

Simple halved joint

A halved joint is a woodworking joint in which the two members are joined by removing material from each at the point of intersection so that they overlap. The halved joint is differentiated from the lap joint in that the members are joined on edge, rather than on flat.

The simple halved joint is created by cutting a slot in opposite edges of the members to be joined so that they slip together. Most commonly, the amount of material removed is equal to half the width of the members being joined, although this depends on the relative dimensions of the members. This joint is relatively weak and prone to splitting, due to the lack of shoulders which would otherwise prevent twisting. When extra strength is required, a strengthened version of the joint is called for. This involves a more elaborate cut out which incorporates shoulders to prevent twisting of the joint.

== Applications ==
- Partitions in trays and drawers
- Construction of torsion boxes

== Methods ==
Halved joints can be cut by the following methods:

- Hand saw and chisel
- circular saw with multiple passes (depending on width and depth)
- dado set in a single pass
- electric router using a straight or rebate bit
- spindle moulder
- Laser cutter

== See also ==
- Bridle joint
- Lap joint
