= Finger joint =

Wedge-shaped connection in wood

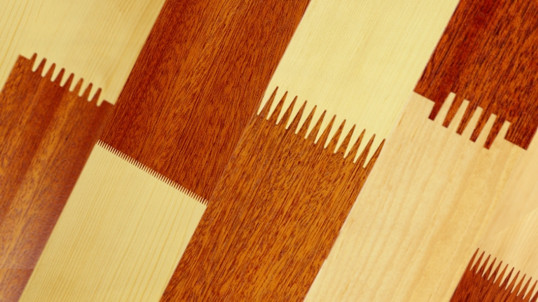
A number of different finger joint profiles used decoratively

A finger joint, also known as a comb joint, is a woodworking joint made by cutting a set of complementary, interlocking profiles in two pieces of wood, which are then glued. The cross-section of the joint resembles the interlocking of fingers between two hands, hence the name "finger joint". The sides of each profile increase the surface area for gluing, resulting in a strong bond, stronger than a butt joint but not very visually appealing. Finger joints are regularly confused with box joints, which are used for corners of boxes or box-like constructions.

== Creation ==
Finger joints are generally created by using identical profiles for both pieces. They are made complementary by rotation or translation of the tool with respect to the workpiece. Typically a finger router bit is used, but spindle moulders can also be used. Manual cutting of finger joints is time-consuming and error prone hence rarely done except in craft pieces.

== Applications ==
A tapered or scarfed finger joint is the most common joint used to form long pieces of lumber from solid boards; the result is finger-jointed lumber.

The finger joint can also be valuable when creating baseboards, moulding or trim, and can be used in such things as floor boards, and door construction.

== See also ==
- Dovetail joint
- Miter joint
- Box joint
- Lap joint
