= Hammer-headed tenon =

Woodworking joing

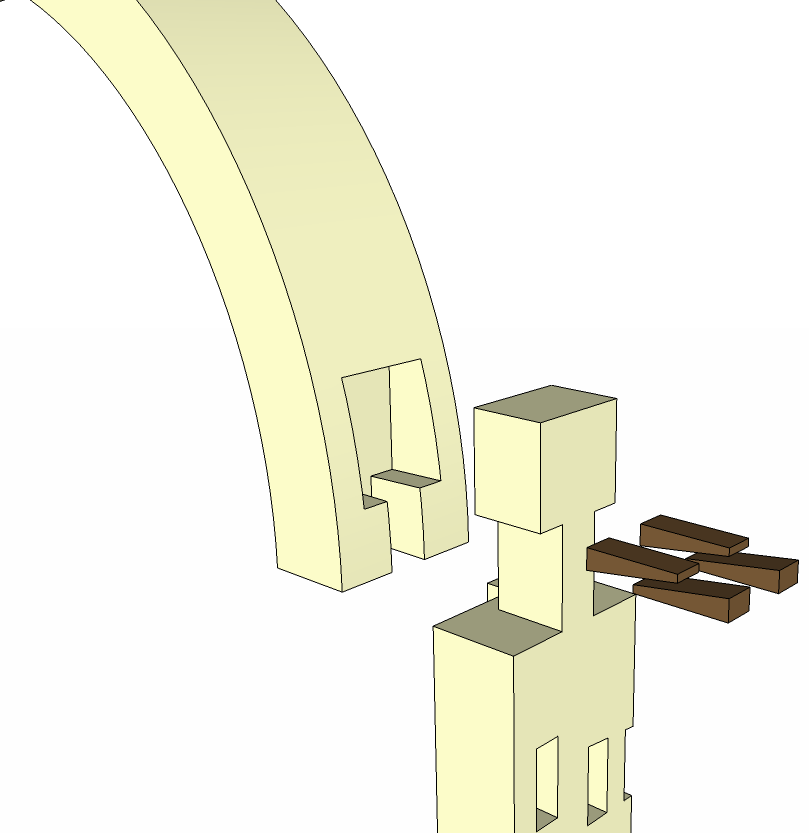
Example detail of Hammer-headed tenon.

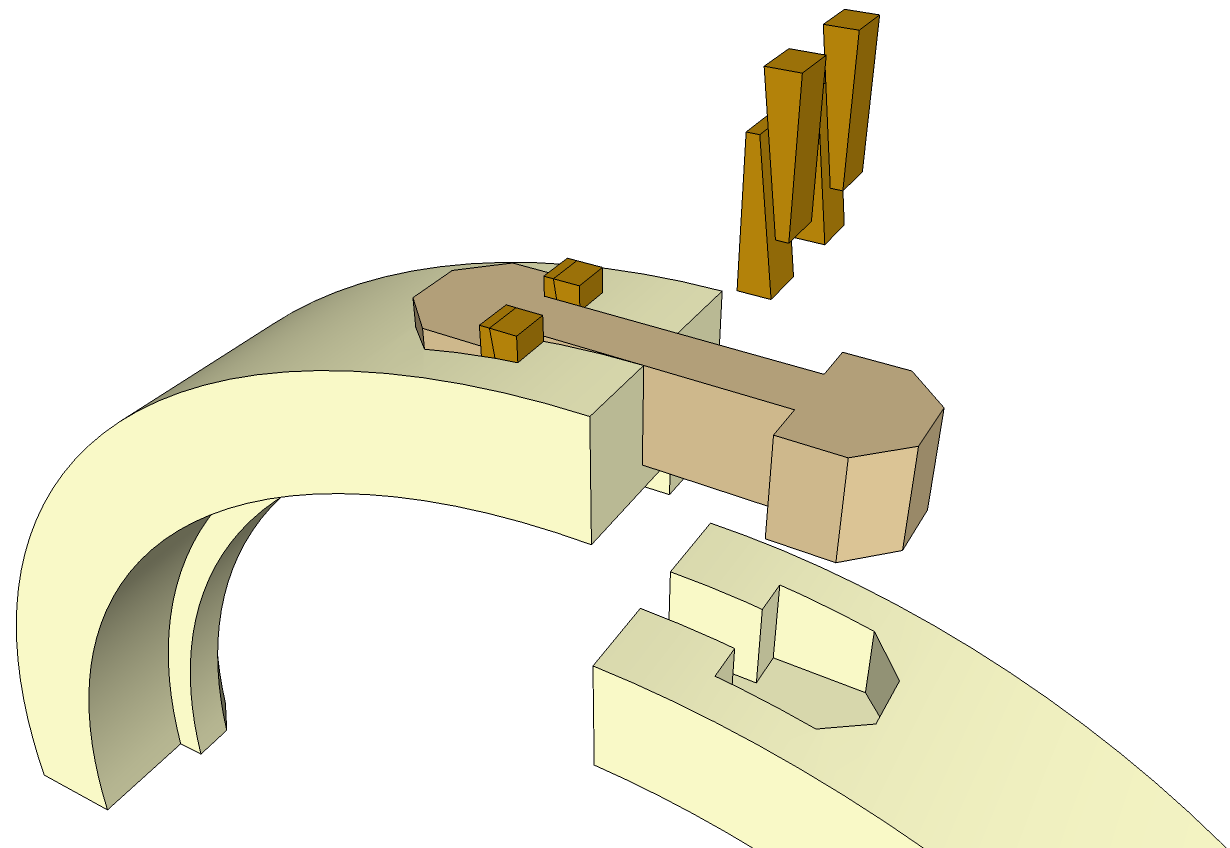
Example detail of Hammer-headed key.

Hammer-headed tenon joints are one method that can be used to join curved members of joinery components.

The hammer-headed tenon is used to join a curved member to a straight member such as a curved head member to a jamb. The tenon is formed on the jamb and the mortise to receive the tenon is formed on the curved member. The mortise is increased in size to receive a pair of folding wedges each side of the tenon.

The hammer-headed key is used where there is no straight member to form the tenon. It is difficult to form a strong tenon on curved cut timber as the short grain there will weaken it, so two mortise sockets are formed one in each piece and a separate tenon piece called a key is formed to fit. As with the hammer-headed tenon the mortise sockets are increased in size to allow for the folding wedges each side of the tenon.

When the joint is fitted and glued together it is the folding wedges that give the cramping effect that tightens the shoulder of the joint.

Both these hammer-headed joints need good attention to detail from the joiner as they are difficult to make completely by machine or power tool.

Other joints that can be used on curved headed frames are:
Draw dowelled bridle or mortise
Handrail bolts and dowels
