= Mortise and tenon =

Woodworking joint

Diagram of a mortise (left) and tenon (right)

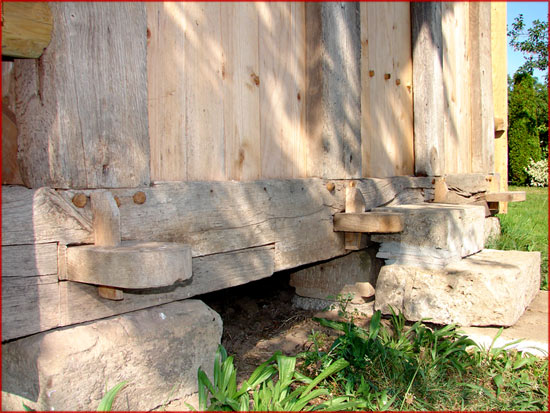
Tusked-through tenons used on a French granary

1) Through tenon and 2) mortise as a shouldered joint

A mortise and tenon (occasionally mortice and tenon) is a joint that connects two pieces of wood or other material. Woodworkers around the world have used it for thousands of years to join pieces of wood, mainly when the adjoining pieces connect at right angles, though it can be used to connect two work pieces at any angle.

Mortise-and-tenon joints are strong, stable, and can be used in many projects. They can also provide an attractive look. They are either glued or friction-fitted into place. This joint is difficult to make, because of the precise measuring and tight cutting required; as such, modern woodworkers often use machinery specifically designed to cut mortises and matching tenons quickly and easily. Still, many woodworkers cut them by hand in a traditional manner. There are many variations of this type of joint, but its basic structure has two components, the mortise hole and the tenon tongue.

The tenon, formed on the end of a member generally referred to as a rail, fits into a square or rectangular hole cut into the other, corresponding member. The tenon is cut to fit the mortise hole exactly. It usually has shoulders that seat when the joint fully enters the mortise hole. The joint may be glued, pinned, or wedged to lock it in place.

This joint is also used with other materials, as traditionally by both stonemasons and blacksmiths.

== Etymology ==
Mortise, "a hole or groove in which something is fitted to form a joint," comes from c. 1400 from Old French mortaise (13th century), possibly from Arabic murtazz, "fastened", past participle of razza, "cut a mortise in." Tenon, in use in English since the late 14th century, developed its nounal sense of "a projection inserted to make a joint" from the Old French tenir "to hold".

== History and ancient examples ==
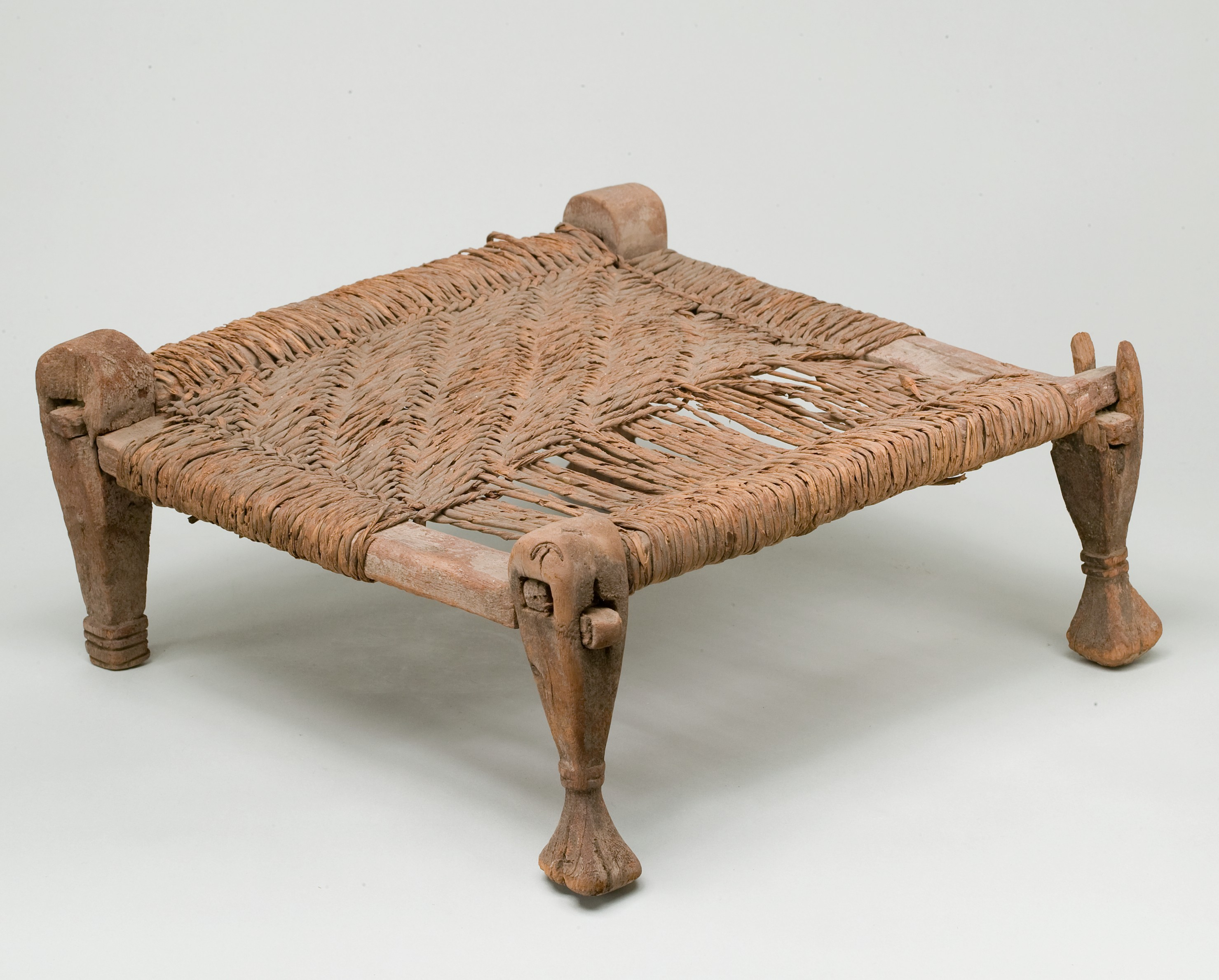
Egyptian stool with through tenons, c. 1991–1450 BC

The mortise-and-tenon joint is an ancient one. One of the earliest mortise-and-tenon structure examples dates back 7,000 years to the Hemudu culture in China's Zhejiang Province. Tusked mortise-and-tenon joints were found in a well near Leipzig, created by early Neolithic Linear Pottery culture, and used in construction of the wooden lining of the wells. Mortise-and-tenon joints have been found joining the wooden planks of the "Khufu ship", a 43.6 m (143 ft) long vessel sealed into a pit in the Giza pyramid complex of the Fourth Dynasty around 2500 BC. They were also found in the Uluburun shipwreck (14th century BC).

Illustration of ship hull demonstrating the Phoenician joint technique of locked (pegged) mortise and tenon

Mortise-and-tenon joints have also been found in ancient furniture from archaeological sites in the Middle East, Europe and Asia. Many instances are found, for example, in ruins of houses in the Silk Road kingdom of Cadota, dating from the first to the 4th century BC. In traditional Chinese architecture, wood components such as beams, brackets, roof frames, and struts were made to interlock with perfect fit, without using fasteners or glues, enabling the wood to expand and contract according to humidity. Archaeological evidence from Chinese sites shows that, by the end of the Neolithic, mortise-and-tenon joinery was employed in Chinese construction.

The thirty sarsen stones of Stonehenge were dressed and fashioned with mortise-and-tenon joints before they were erected between 2600 and 2400 BC.

A variation of the mortise-and-tenon technique, called Phoenician joints (from the Latin coagmenta punicana) was extensively used in ancient shipbuilding to assemble hull planks and other watercraft components together. It is a locked (pegged) mortise-and-tenon technique that consists of cutting two mortises into the edges of two planks; a separate rectangular tenon is then inserted in the two mortises. The assembly is then locked in place by driving a dowel through one or more holes drilled through the mortise side wall and tenon.

== Description ==
Generally, the size of the mortise and tenon is related to the thickness of the timbers. It is good practice to proportion the tenon as one third the thickness of the rail, or as close to this as is practical. The haunch, the cut-away part of a sash corner joint that prevents the tenon coming loose, is one third the length of the tenon and one-sixth of the width of the tenon in its depth. The remaining two-thirds of the rail, the tenon shoulders, help to counteract lateral forces that might tweak the tenon from the mortise, contributing to its strength. These also serve to hide imperfections in the opening of the mortise.

=== Types ===
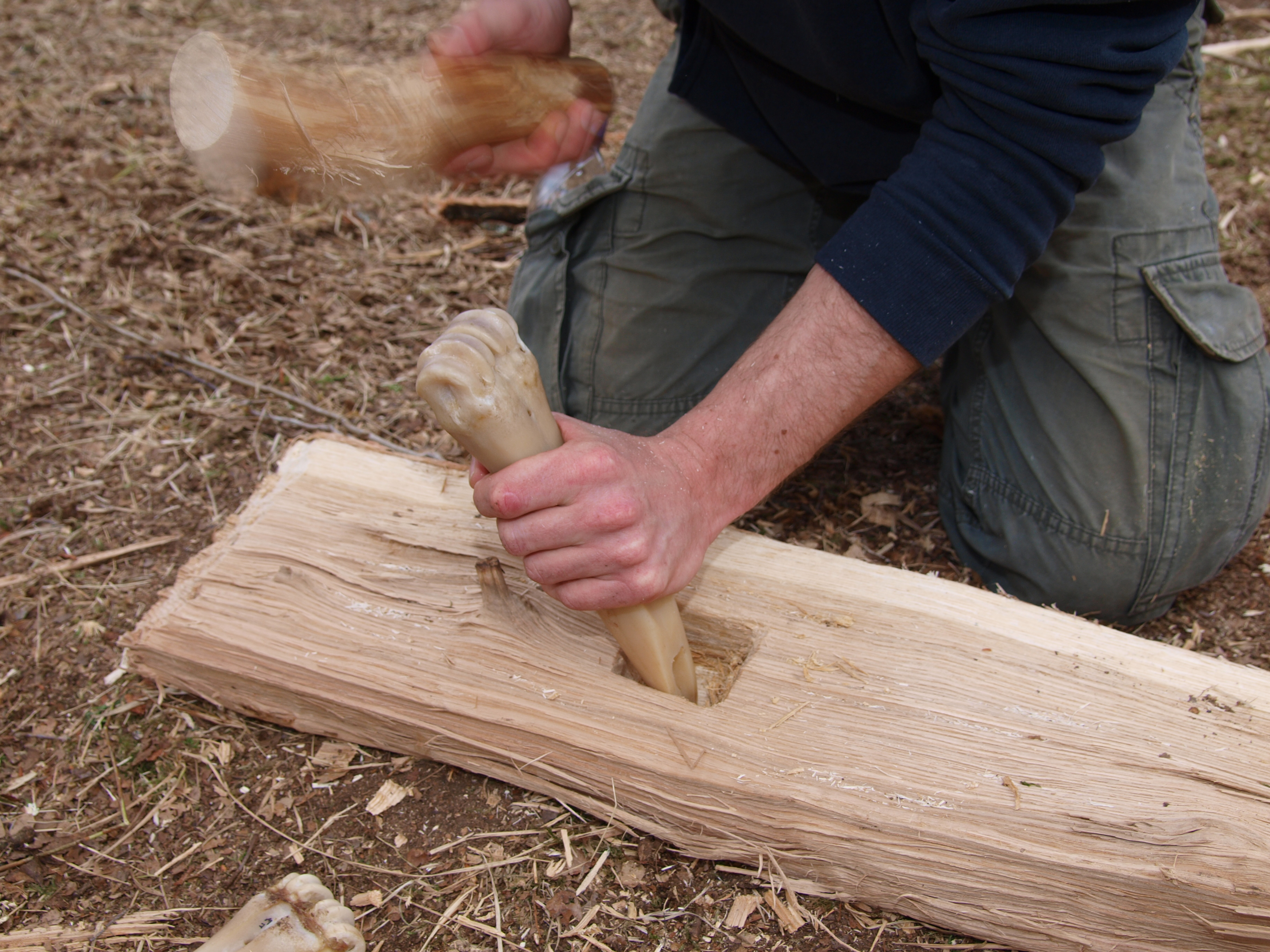
Experimental archaeology; cutting a mortise with a cannonbone chisel

==== Mortises ====
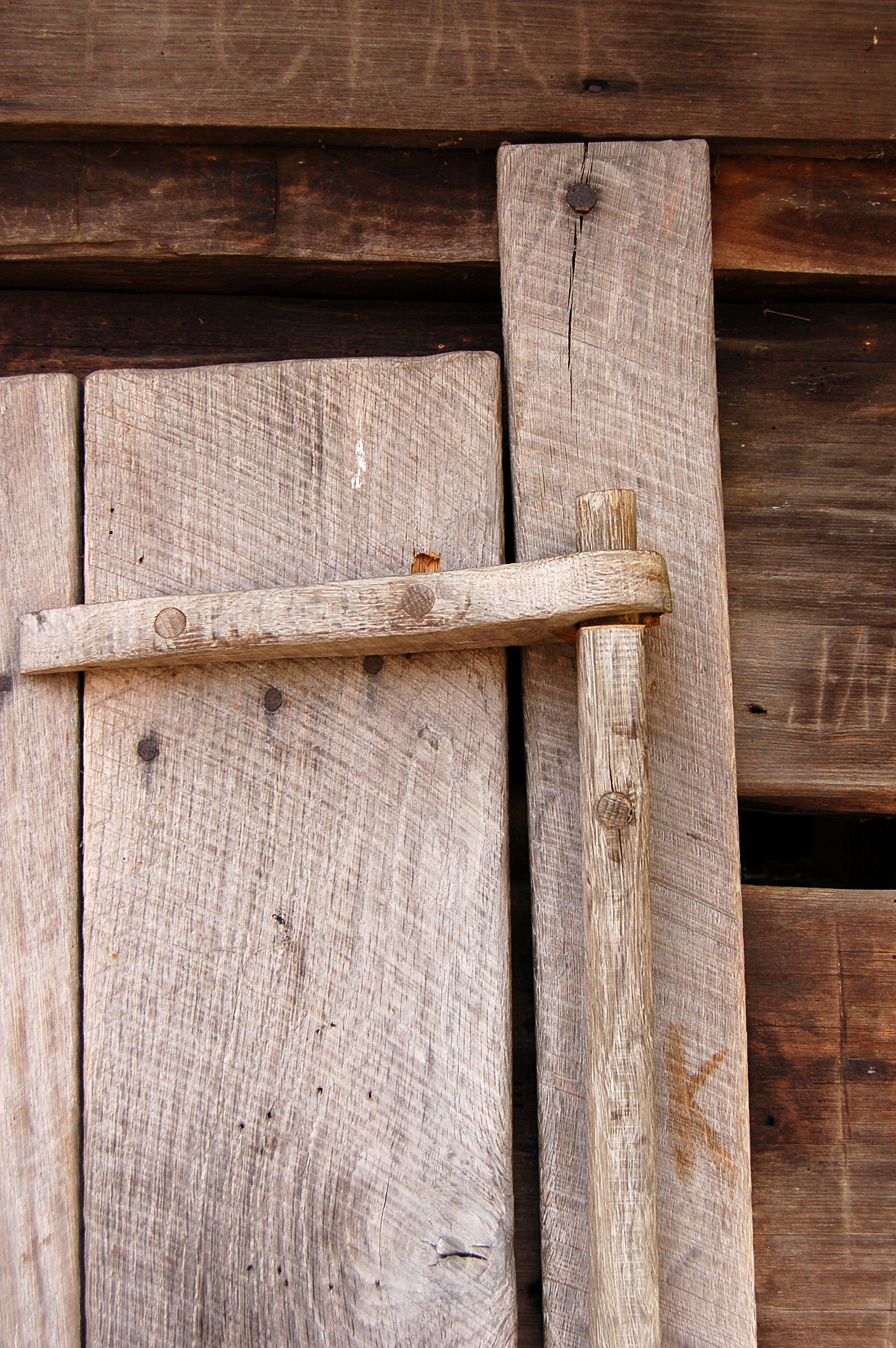
A through mortise is used in this wooden hinge.

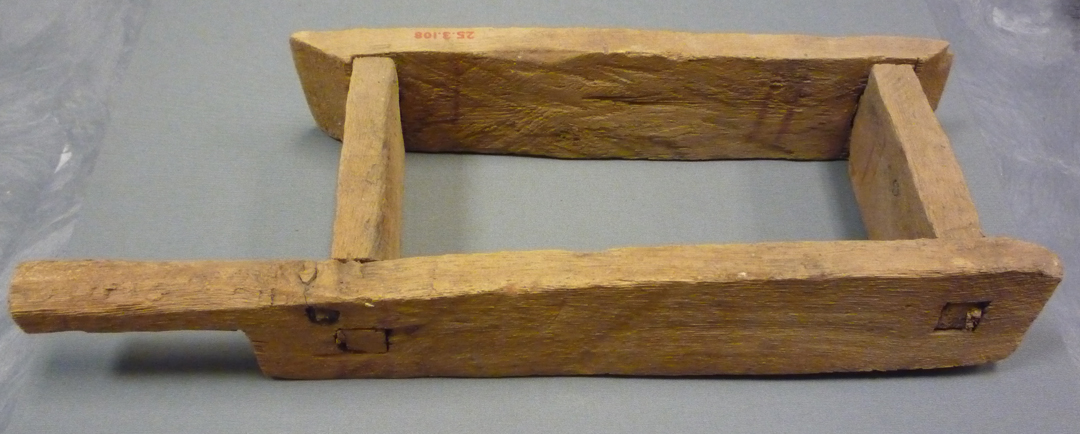
Brick mold from ancient Egypt held together with mortise joints

A mortise is a hole cut into a timber to receive a tenon. There are several kinds of mortise:

- Open mortise: a mortise that has only three sides. (See bridle joint).
- Stub mortise: a shallow mortise, the depth of which depends on the size of the timber; also a mortise that does not go through the workpiece (as opposed to a "through mortise").
- Through mortise: a mortise that passes entirely through a piece.
- Wedged half-dovetail: a mortise in which the back is wider, or taller, than the front, or opening. The space for the wedge initially leaves room to insert the tenon. The wedge, after the tenon is engaged, prevents its withdrawal.
- Through-wedged half-dovetail: a wedged half-dovetail mortise that passes entirely through the piece.

==== Tenons ====
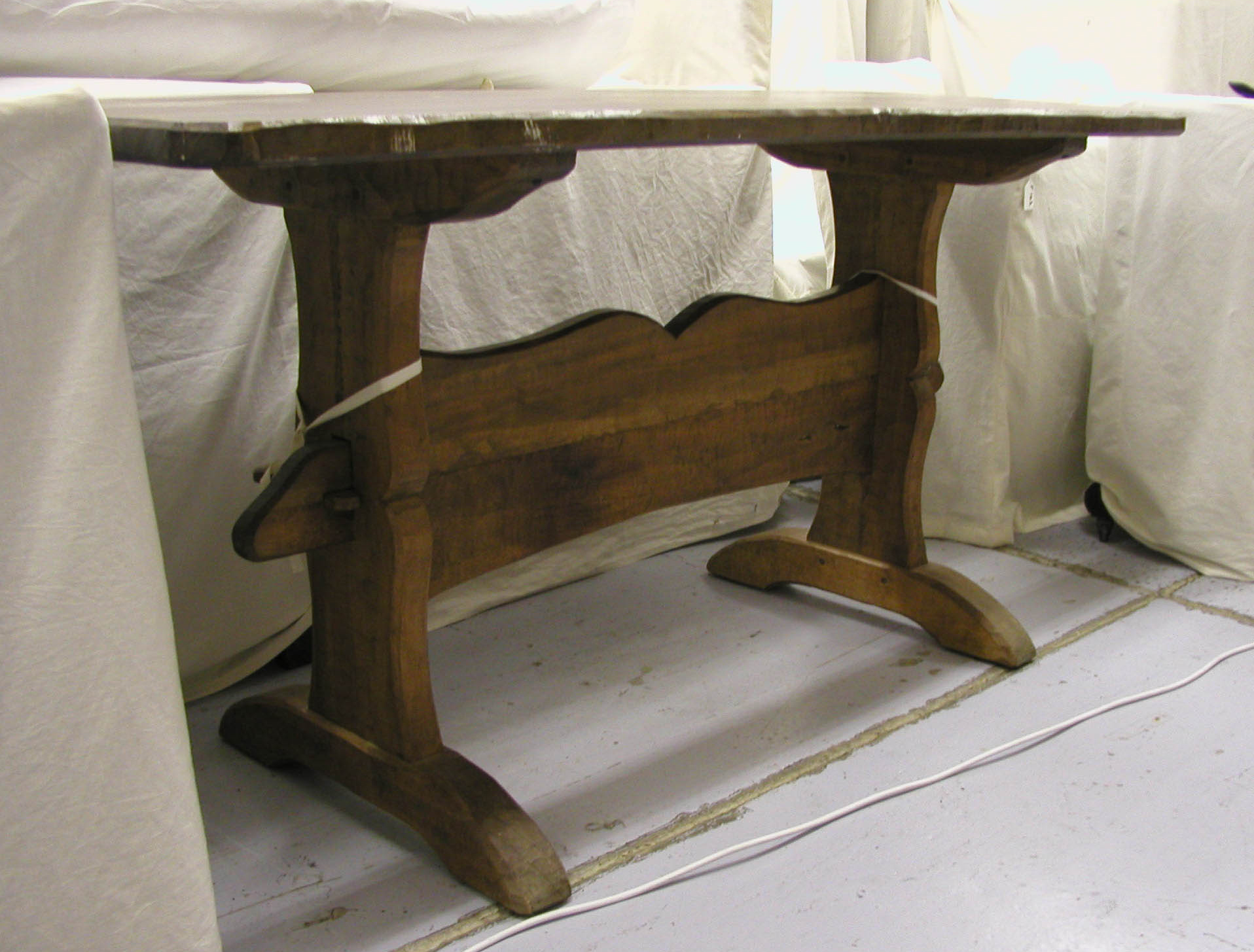
Two tusked through tenons are used to hold the trestles of this trestle table together.

A tenon is a projection on the end of a timber for insertion into a mortise. Usually, the tenon is taller than it is wide. There are several kinds of tenons:

- Stub tenon: a short tenon, the depth of which depends on the size of the timber; also a tenon that is shorter than the width of the mortised piece so the tenon does not show (as opposed to a "through tenon").
- Through tenon: a tenon that passes entirely through the piece of wood it is inserted into, being clearly visible on the rear side.
- Loose tenon: a tenon that is a separate part of the joint, as opposed to a fixed tenon that is an integral part of one of the pieces to be joined.
- Biscuit tenon: a thin oval piece of wood, shaped like a biscuit
- Pegged (or pinned) tenon: the joint is strengthened by driving a peg or dowel pin (treenail) through one or more holes drilled through the mortise side wall and tenon; this is common in timber framing joints.
- Tusk tenon: a kind of mortise-and-tenon joint held together by a wedge-shaped key.
- Teasel (or teazle) tenon: a term used for the tenon on top of a jowled or gunstock post, which is typically received by the mortise in the underside of a tie beam. A common element of the English tying joint.
- Top tenon: the tenon that occurs on top of a post.
- Hammer-headed tenon: a method of forming a tenon joint when the shoulders cannot be tightened with a clamp.
- Half shoulder tenon: an asymmetric tenon with a shoulder on one side only. A common use is in framed, ledged, and braced doors.

== Gallery ==
A traditional through, wedged, mortise-and-tenon joint

A stub tenon corner joint

A haunched stub tenon corner joint

A foxtail wedged tenon joint

A pinned corner tenon joint

A modern feather tenon joint (primarily called a loose tenon)

== See also ==
- Box joint
- Dado
- Dovetail joint
- Kumiko
