= Box joint =

Type of woodworking joint

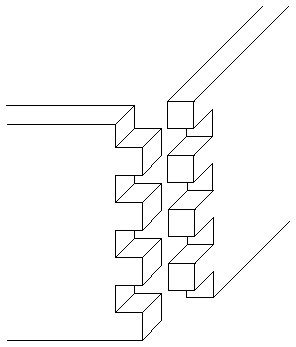
Box joint

A box joint is a woodworking joint made by cutting a set of complementary, interlocking profiles in two pieces of wood, which are then joined (usually) at right angles, usually glued. The glued box joint has a high glued surface area resulting in a strong bond, on a similar principle to a finger joint. Box joints are used for corners of boxes or box-like constructions, hence the name. The joint does not have the same interlocking properties as a dovetail joint, but is much simpler to make, and can be mass-produced fairly easily.

== Creation ==
Box joints are generally created by using the same profile but displaced for both halves. In modern workshops these are often made on table saws, sometimes using a dado set. Custom machinery can cut the entire joint in one pass, using a suitable jig multiple pieces, even of opposing senses, can be cut at once. They were traditionally produced manually using a tenon saw and chisel, and fine cabinet makers still use these methods. Jigs can also be used, as with dovetails, to help produce a consistent result.

== Applications ==
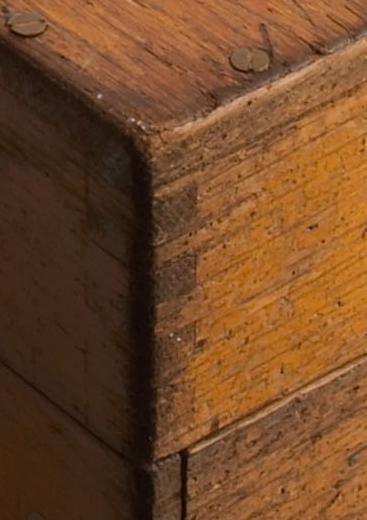
Box joint detail from the lid of an Enigma machine

Applications include all sorts of wooden boxes and carcasses. While primarily used for right angle joints it can also be used for hexagonal boxes and other unusual shapes. It is used for the sides of drawers and lids, but not, in general, for joining thin panels to structural members.

== See also ==
- Bridle joint
- Dovetail joint
- Finger joint
- Miter joint
