= Bridle joint =

Woodworking joint

Corner bridle joint

T-bridle joint

A bridle joint is a woodworking joint, similar to a mortise and tenon, in that a tenon is cut on the end of one member and a mortise is cut into the other to accept it. The distinguishing feature is that the tenon and the mortise are cut to the full width of the tenon member.

The corner bridle joint (also known as a slot mortise and tenon) joins two members at their respective ends, forming a corner. This form of the joint is commonly used to house a rail in uprights, such as legs. It provides good strength in compression and is fairly resistant to racking, although a mechanical fastener or pin is often required. The bridle joint is very popular in workbench construction.

Corner bridles are often used to join frame components when the frame is to be shaped. Material can be removed from the joined members after assembly without sacrificing joint integrity.

A variation of the bridle joint is the T-bridle, which joins the end of one member to the middle of another. The tee bridle joint is very strong and good for joining 2 pieces together.

In traditional timber framing the bridle joint is commonly used to join the tops of principal rafters.

== Applications ==
- Legs or stiles to rails
- Frames

== Methods ==
Corner bridles can be cut by the following methods:

- Hand saw and chisel
- Circular saw with multiple passes (depending on width and depth)
- Table saw with a dado set in a single pass
- Electric router using a straight or rabbet bit
- Spindle mould
- Brace and auger to start the mortise, followed by chiseling to square the opening
- Mortising machine to create the mortise

== See also ==
- Box joint
- Lap joint
- Mortise and tenon
