= Scarf joint =

Method of joining two members end to end in woodworking or metalworking

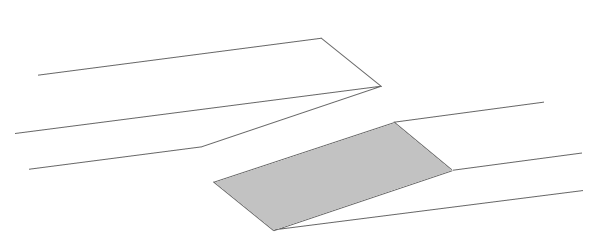
A plain scarf joint

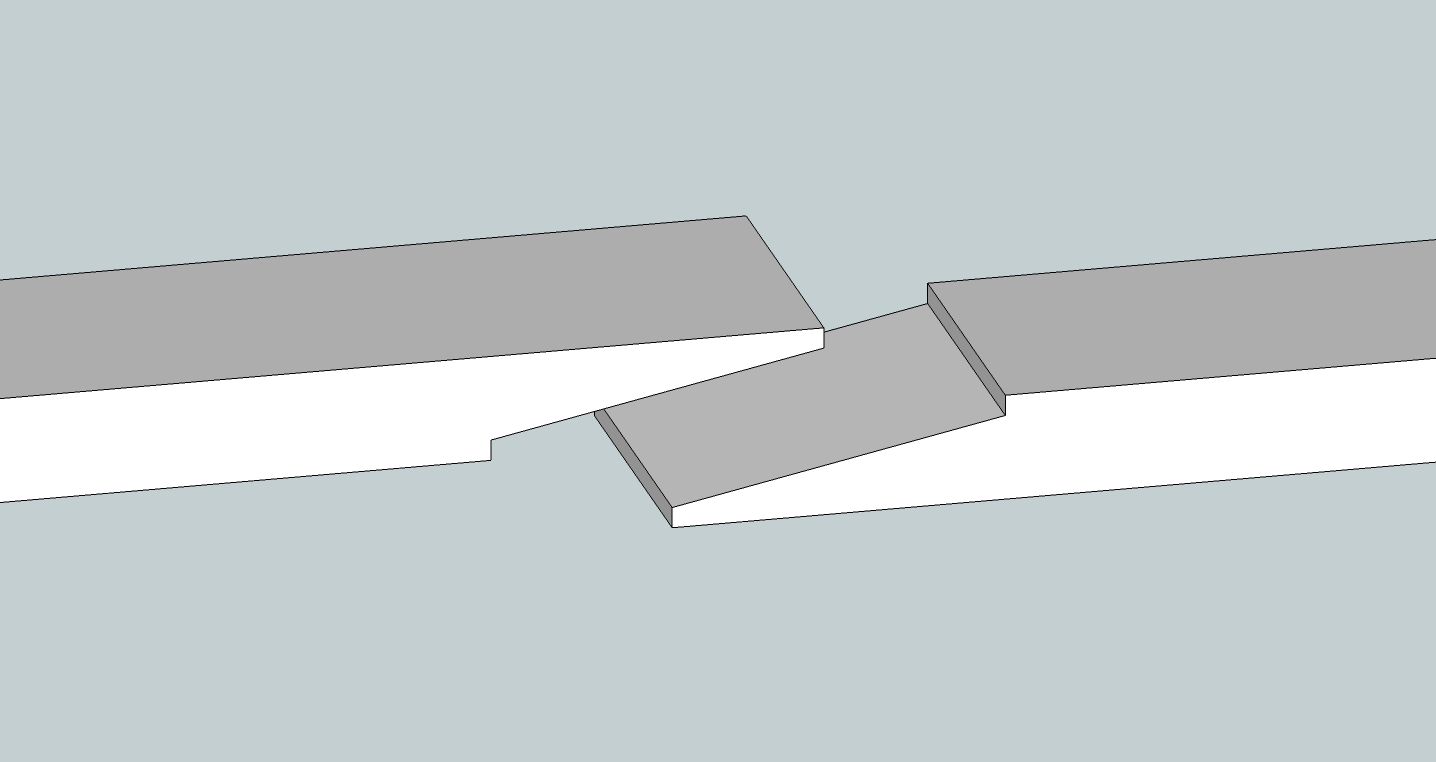
A nibbed scarf joint

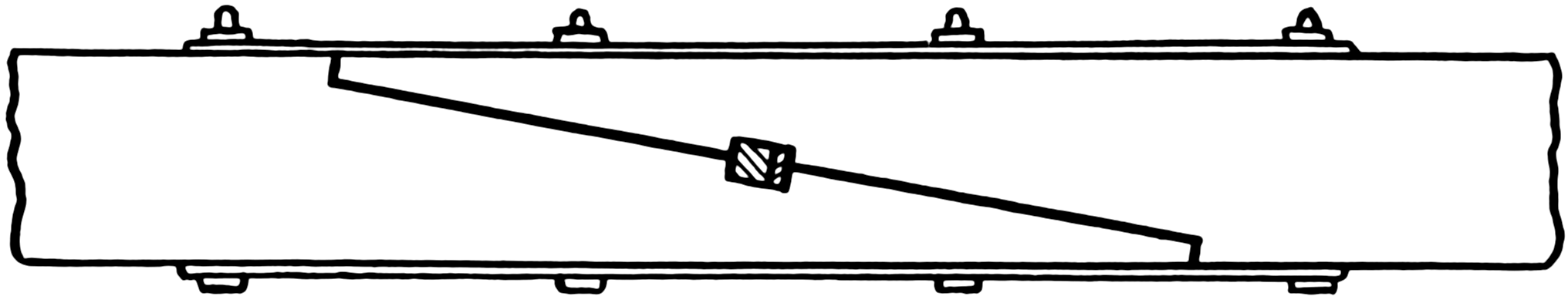
A keyed, nibbed scarf, reinforced with fish plates and through bolts

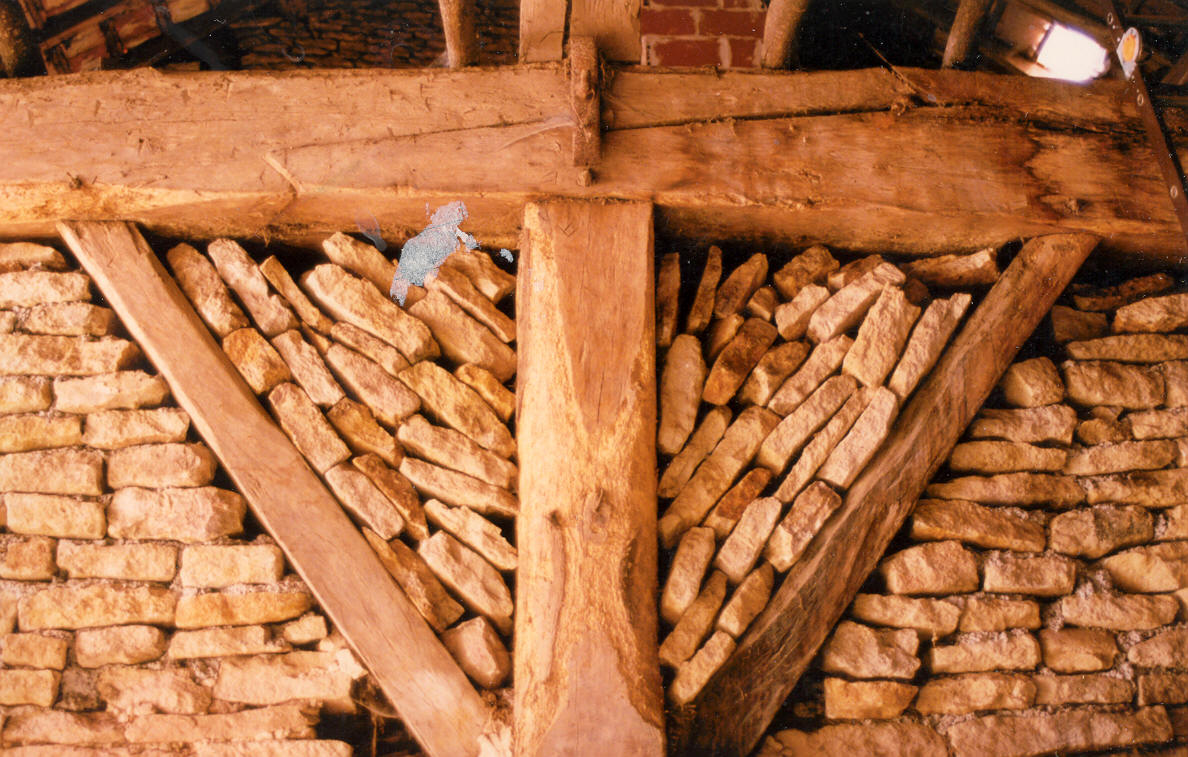
The scarf joint used on the beams above the post is known by its French name, trait de jupiter, or bolt-o-lightning joint.

A scarf joint, or scarph joint, is a method of joining two members end to end in woodworking or metalworking. The scarf joint is used when the material being joined is not available in the length required. It is an alternative to other joints such as the butt joint and the splice joint and is often favored over these in joinery because it yields a barely visible glue line.

== Methods ==
The joint is formed by cutting opposing tapered ends on each member which are then fitted together. When working with wood, this gives better long grain-to-long grain gluing surface, which yields a stronger joint than would be achieved with a simple butt joint. The tapers are generally cut at an angle between 1:8 to 1:10. The ends of a plain scarf are feathered to a fine point which aids in the obscuring of the joint in the finished work, while in other forms of scarf the ends are frequently cut to a blunt "nib" which engages a matching shoulder in the mating piece.

Where scarfed joints are used in the restoration of vintage aircraft, most developed countries will only issue an airworthiness certificate if all such joints have used an angle no less than 1:8.

== Strength ==
Determination of the maximum axial force for two pieces joined by adhesive can easily be determined using two equations that can be derived from the geometry of the problem by breaking the axial force component into a tensile force and shear force normal and parallel to the scarf joint. Shear strength is assumed to be equal to σ/2. The following equations need to be adjusted if the shear strength is greater than σ/2. The two equations that give a maximum axial force are F=σ/sin(α)^2 and F=σ/sin(2α), where α is the angle from the horizontal to the joint. Both should be evaluated for a given problem, and the smaller F of the two is the magnitude of the maximum allowable axial force. The first equation accounts for failure in tension. The second equation accounts for failure in shear. Some special angles should be noted or the graphs of two equations should be compared on the same plot. The joint is weakest at α=90° due to tension limits and 45° due to shear limits. However, α=45° will be stronger than α=90° if shear strength is greater than σ/2. The joint is strongest between these two angles at 63.4°. The joint becomes stronger than 63.4° at 25.4°. At a shallow enough angle, strength of the joint continues to increase and failure will occur anywhere in the two pieces, most likely outside the joint.

== Variations ==
In woodworking, there are two distinctly different categories of scarf, based on whether the joint has interlocking faces or not. A plain scarf is simply two flat planes meeting on an angle relative to the axis of the stock being joined, and depends entirely on adhesive and/or mechanical fasteners (such as screws, nails, or bolts) for all strength. Interlocking scarf joints, such as a hooked, keyed, and nibbed scarves, offer varying degrees of tensile and compressive strength, though most still depend on mechanical fastening to keep the joint closed.

The plain scarf is not preferred when strength is required, so it is often used in decorative situations, such as the application of trim or moulding. The use of modern high-strength adhesives can greatly increase the structural performance of a plain scarf.

The keyed-hook scarf is common in ship and boat-building, as well as timber framing and wooden bridge construction. In large timbers such as these the scarf is virtually always secured with through-bolts, and is frequently reinforced externally with iron or steel fishplates, and/or strapping.

A scarf joint may also be used to fix problems caused when a board is cut too short for the application. The board can be cut in half with a tapered cut yielding a scarf joint. When the joint is glued together, the tapers are slid against each other so that the two sections are no longer in line with each other. This has the effect of making the board longer. Once the glue has set, the board can be planed-down to an even thickness, resulting in a longer but slightly thinner board.

In traditional timber framing there are many types of scarf joints used to join timbers.

== Bibliography ==
- Schwartz, Mel M. (1995). Brazing: for the engineering technologist. Springer. ISBN 978-0-412-60480-5..
