= Dowelmax =

Dowelling jig

The Dowelmax Jig with distance gauge bar

The Dowelmax is a loose tenon dowelling jig manufactured by the O.M.S. Tool company in Canada. The manufacturer claims that the small manufacturing tolerances of 0.026 millimetres (0.0010 in) for the aluminium, brass and steel components of the jig ensure accuracy and repeatability, but the precision manufacturing adds to the unit's cost.

The tool allows the placement of five dowels in one pass. A distance gauge bar provided with the jig allows accurate spacing between sets of dowels.

== Joint strength ==
Tests by both the manufacturer, and Wood magazine (in 2007), claim to show that dowel joints made with the Dowelmax are stronger than most other woodworking joints tested. In addition, a 2011 review by Wood magazine rated Dowelmax as a superior dowel joinery tool, describing Dowelmax as "the best dowelling jig ever made".

=== Independent test ===
Shear Test
Mortise and tenon	1,017 psi (7,010 kPa)
Dowelmax	609 psi (4,200 kPa)
Beadlock	541 psi (3,730 kPa)
Domino	464 psi (3,200 kPa)
Biscuits	187 psi (1,290 kPa)

Pull-apart Test
Mortise and tenon	2,525 psi (17,410 kPa)
Dowelmax	1,866 psi (12,870 kPa)
Domino	1,486 psi (10,250 kPa)
Beadlock	1,170 psi (8,100 kPa)
Biscuits	766 psi (5,280 kPa)

=== Hydraulic comparison strength testing by manufacturer ===
Shear Test
Multiple Dowel (Dowelmax)	890 psi (6,100 kPa)
Routed Mortise & Tenon	680 psi (4,700 kPa)
Double Domino	540 psi (3,700 kPa)
Square Mortise & Tenon	480 psi (3,300 kPa)
Pocket Hole (5 Screws)	420 psi (2,900 kPa)
#20 Biscuit	285 psi (1,970 kPa)
