= Butt joint =

Woodworking joint

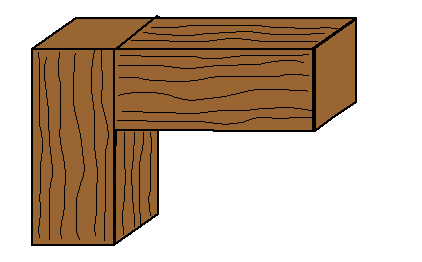
Butt joint

A butt joint is a wood joint in which the end of a piece of material is simply placed (or “butted”) against another piece. The butt joint is the simplest joint. An unreinforced butt joint is also the weakest joint, as it provides a limited surface area for gluing and lacks any mechanical interlocking to resist external forces.

Nonetheless, it generally provides sufficient strength in most cases, particularly when fasteners are used. Additional reinforcement through ties and plates is often used to improve the characteristics of butt-jointed structures. The joint is widely used in many applications due to its simplicity, notably in rough carpentry and construction.

== Methods ==
There are several types of butt joint based on the orientation of the pieces being joined. These include the T-butt, end-to-end butt, miter butt and edge-to-edge butt.

The T-butt joint is a very simple joint to construct. Members are simply docked (cut off) at a right angle and at the required length. One member will be shorter than the finished size by the thickness of the adjacent member. For enclosed constructions, such as four-sided frames or boxes, the thickness of the two adjacent members must be taken into consideration. For example: when constructing a four-sided box made from 19 mm thick material that is to be of finished size 600 mm × 600 mm, two of the members will be docked at 600 mm and the other two will be docked at 600 mm − 19 mm − 19 mm = 562 mm.

Reinforced butt joints may require additional steps which are detailed below.

In solid timber, docking of members for a butt joint is usually a crosscut, so a crosscut saw is best for this job. When working with sheet goods, there is no distinction between crosscut and rip cut.

The joint members can be docked by any of the following methods:

Carcase butt joints

- Crosscut saw
- Circular saw and straightedge
- Table saw

Frame butt joints

- Crosscut backsaw
- Miter saw
- Table saw using a mitre gauge, crosscut sled, or sliding table attachment.

== Reinforced butt joints ==
To overcome their inherent weakness, butt joints are usually reinforced by one of the following methods:

=== Lashed butt joint ===
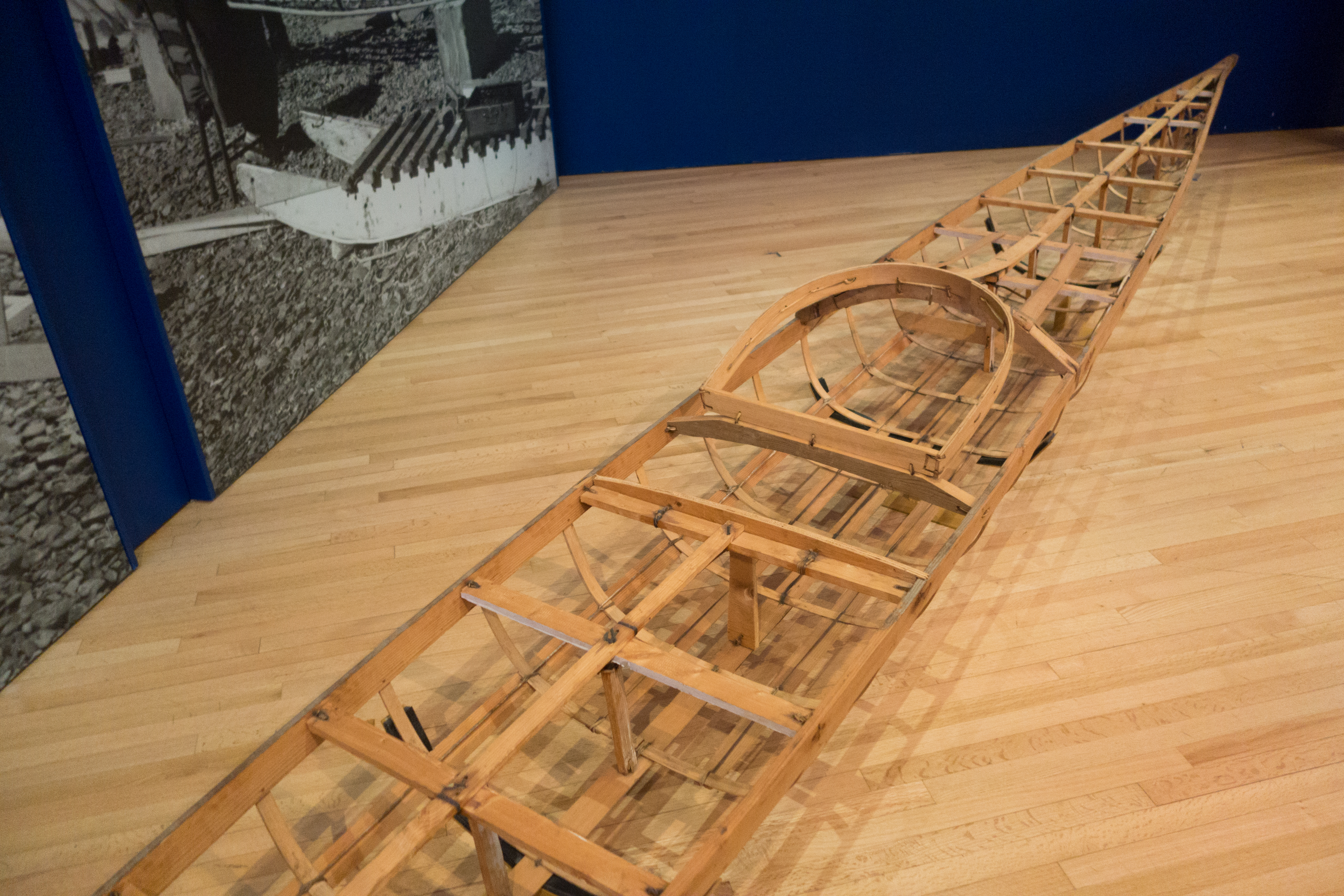
Lashed butt joints in a kayak frame

A butt joint may be held by lashings.

=== Nailed butt joint ===
This is the most common form of the butt joint in building construction. Members are brought together and a number of nails are driven in to hold them in place. The technique of skew-nailing is applied so that nails are not parallel to each other and so resist the pulling apart of the joint. This form of butt joint is rarely used in furniture making.

Used for:

- framing in building construction, such as platform framing
- Basic or temporary box/cabinet/frame making
- woodwork toys

=== Dowel-reinforced butt joint ===
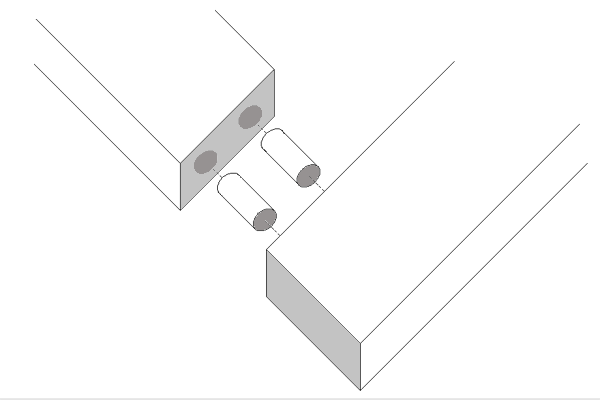
A dowel reinforced butt joint

The dowel-reinforced butt joint or simply dowel joint has been a very common method of reinforcing butt joints in furniture for years. They are common in both frame and carcase construction. Dowel joints are popular in chairs, cabinets, panels and tabletops. They are also used to assist with alignment during glue up.

The technique consists of cutting the members to size and then drilling a series of holes in the joint surface of each member. Holes are often drilled with the assistance of a dowelling jig which aids in accurate hole placement — accuracy is paramount in this technique to ensure members line up perfectly in the completed joint. The holes are drilled such that there are corresponding holes in each member into which short dowels are inserted with some glue. The joint is brought together and clamped until the glue has dried.

This produces a joint that is much stronger than a butt joint without reinforcement. The dowels offer some holding strength even after the glue has deteriorated. Over time, dowels may shrink and become loose. They take on an oval shape in section owing to the different rate at which wood moves with different orientations of the grain. Loose dowels allow the joint to flex, although it may not fall apart. This phenomenon is evident in creaking chairs and wobbling book cases. For this reason, dowel joints are not preferred for high-quality furniture.

Used for:

- Frame joinery (e.g. face frames, web frames, door frames, table legs to aprons, chair legs)
- Cabinet carcase construction (e.g. carcase sides to top and bottom, fixed shelving/partitions)
- Panel assembly (for alignment)

A variation of the dowel method for reinforcement is the use of a Miller dowel in place of the usual straight cylindrical dowel. The Miller dowel is a stepped dowel and is drilled with a special stepped drill bit. It is drilled from the outside face of the frame piece to be joined and therefore generally leaves an exposed dowel protruding after glue dries, and the excess dowel head is thus usually flush cut. The advantages of the special dowel are documented in various media promoting the method, but one advantage that should not be overlooked is speed of assembly. The butt joint can often be joined temporarily and sometimes more accurately with simply glue, allowing faster set up than the usual tedious alignment procedures mentioned above. After the glue dries one or more Miller dowels are then used to reinforce the joint. Dowel trimming and sanding of the surface, followed by normal finishing then proceed in the usual manner. The blind alignment problems of floating dowels are virtually eliminated by the use of the Miller dowel. Not all projects are appropriate for the stepped dowel method if an exposed dowel end is not visually acceptable, however.

=== Biscuit-reinforced butt joint ===
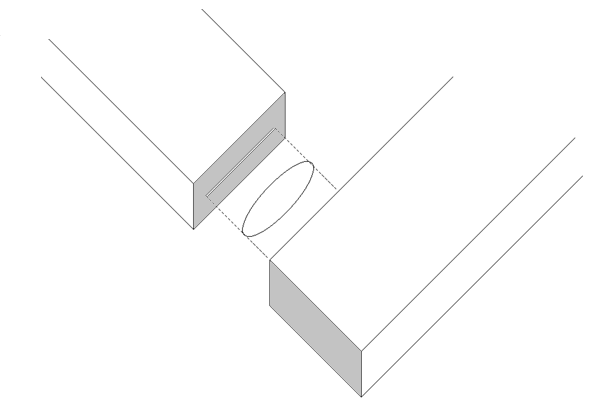
A biscuit reinforced butt joint

The biscuit reinforced butt joint is a fairly recent innovation in butt joint construction. It is used primarily in carcase and frame construction. The biscuit is an oval shaped piece of specially dried and compressed wood, usually beech, which is installed in matching mortises in both members of the joint in a similar fashion to a loose or floating tenon. Biscuit joints are common in both frame and carcase construction. They are particularly convenient for panel glue ups as they facilitate alignment of panel members.

To create the mortise for the biscuit, a biscuit joiner is usually required. There are other methods of cutting the slot, such as a slot cutter bit in a router, but the biscuit joiner is the most common. Accuracy is not as important in the creation of these mortises as the biscuit joint is designed to allow a bit of flexibility during glue up. The mortise must be located at the correct distance from the face of the joint in both members but the width of the mortise is not as critical.

When the mortises have been cut, the biscuit is inserted with some glue and the joint is brought together, aligned and clamped. The biscuit absorbs some moisture from the glue and swells up in the mortise, creating a tightly fitting joint.

Biscuits are available in a range of sizes for different purposes. It is also common to use more than one biscuit side by side in a joint when members are thick.

Used for:

- Frame joinery (e.g. face frames, web frames, table legs to aprons, chair legs)
- Cabinet carcase construction (e.g. carcase sides to top and bottom, fixed shelving/partitions)
- Panel assembly (for alignment)
- Attaching face frames to cabinets
- Bottom

=== Screwed butt joint ===
The screwed butt joint uses one or more screws inserted after the joint has been brought together. The screws are usually inserted into an edge on the long grain side of one member and extend through the joint into the end grain of the adjacent member. For this reason, long screws are required (usually 3 times the thickness of the member) to ensure good traction. These joints may also be glued although it is not necessary.

In solid timber work it is common to counterbore a hole in the frame or carcase member to conceal the head of the screw. This also allows more of the body of the screw to penetrate the adjacent member for greater traction. After the screw has been driven into the joint, the counterbore can be filled with an appropriately sized piece of dowel or a wooden plug cut from an offcut of the same timber using a plug cutter.

There are also commercial systems available for screwed butt joints in which a plastic cap is provided with the screw to be fixed to the head of the screw after it has been driven home. Counterbores are not required for these fasteners. This system is more common with manufactured board products.

The screwed butt joint is common in both frame and carcase joinery. Modular kitchens make regular use of this fixing method.

Used for:

- Frame joinery (e.g. face frames, web frames, door frames)
- Cabinet carcase construction (carcase sides to top and bottom, fixed shelving/partitions)

If the material is a weak-centered one like particleboard, a confirmat screw may be used. This has a large shank and acts more like a dowel.

=== Butt joint with pocket hole screws ===
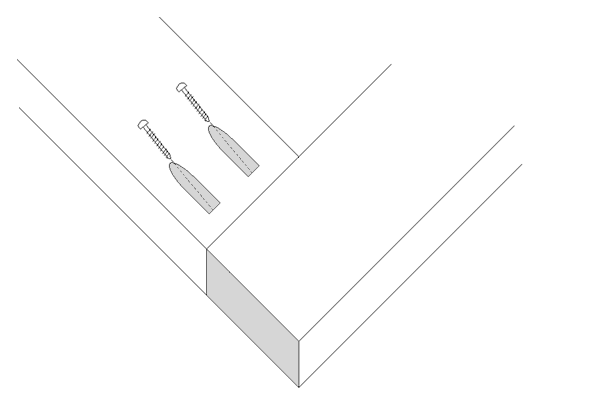
A butt joint with pocket hole screws

This is a variation of the screwed butt joint in which the screws are inserted into pocket holes drilled in the rear face of one of the joint members. The screws extend into cross grain in the adjacent member, so much shorter screws can be used. This method is preferred when the edges of the frame will be visible.

The pocket holes require two drilling operations to be completed. The first is to counterbore the pocket hole itself, which houses the screw head within the member. This hole is stopped 1/4 in (6.4 mm) or so from the edge of the frame member. The second step is to drill a pilot hole concentric with the pocket hole which extends through the edge of the member. The pilot hole allows the screw to pass through the member and into the adjoining member. This two stage drilling operation may be performed with two different sized drill bits, however there are special stepped bits available to perform the operation in a single pass. The drilling operation is often facilitated by a pocket hole jig which allows the user to drill the pocket hole at the correct angle and to the correct depth.

Used for:

- Frame joinery (e.g. face frames, web frames, door frames)
- Attaching face frames to cabinets

=== Cam fasteners ===
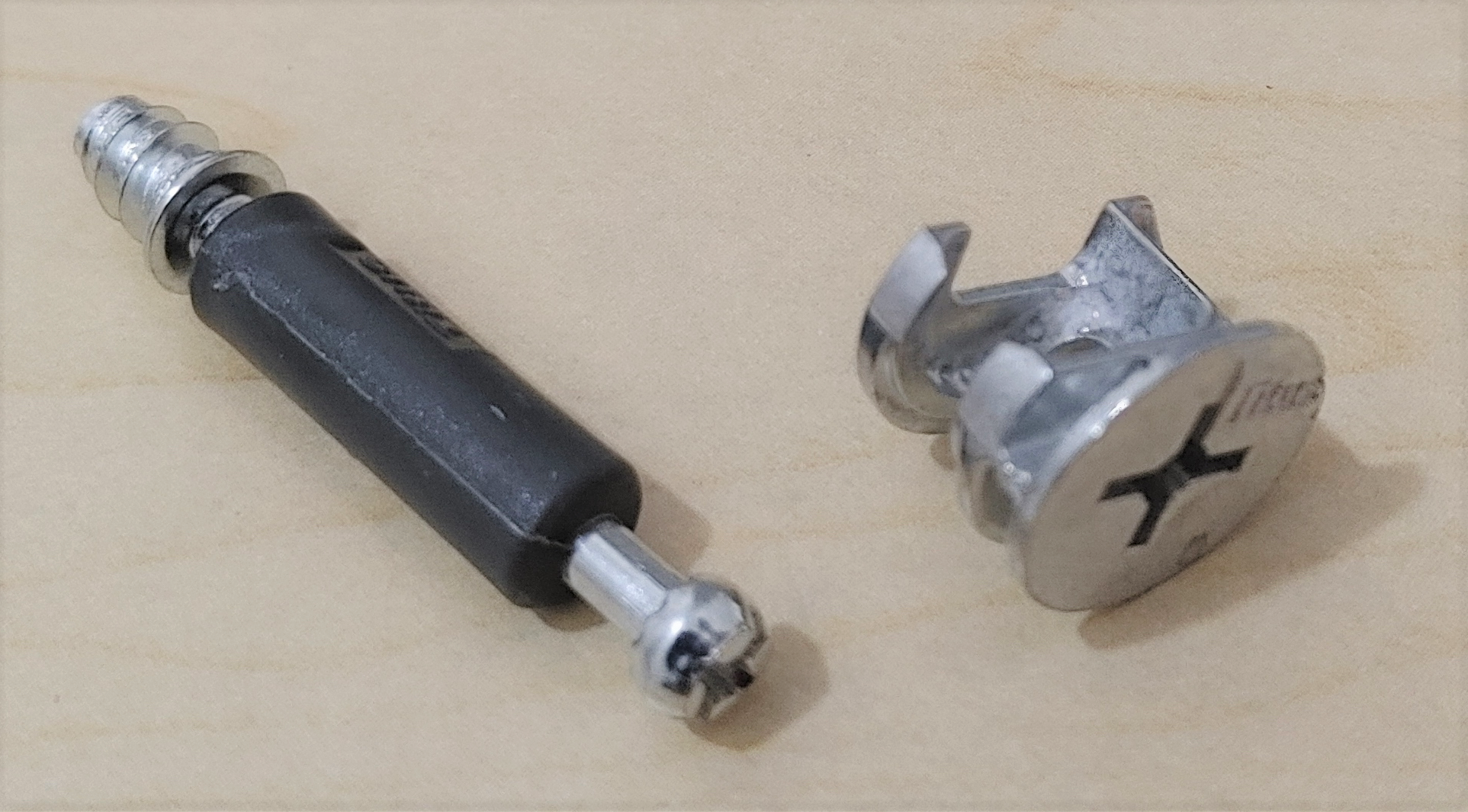
Cam screw and cam nut

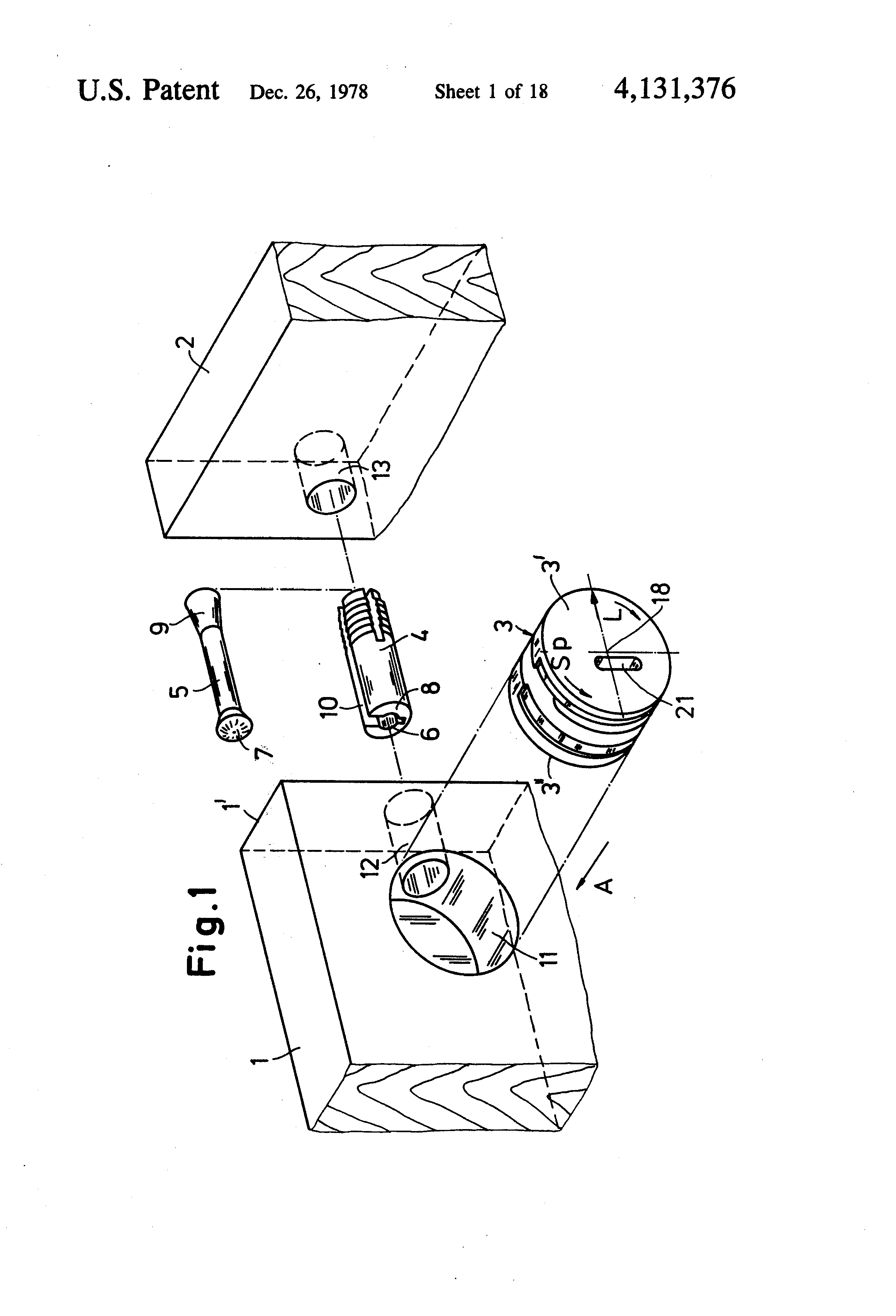
Patent diagram of a cam fastening system

A cam fastener is a two-part knock-down fastener often employed in flat-pack furniture. It consists of a cam post (or cam dowel), with a threaded end and a head, and a cam lock (or cam nut, or simply cam) with a circumferential groove designed to lock onto the head of the post when the cam is rotated perpendicularly to the post axis. It is generally used to attach the edge of a particle board to the face of another.

The cam post is screwed into a predrilled hole in the face of one piece, such that the post head and barrel section protrude. The cam lock is placed in a cylindrical well near the edge of a second piece, which has a predrilled hole extending from the side of the well to the edge of the piece. With the cam aligned to allow insertion of the post head, the two boards are brought together, such that the post head rests inside the cam. The cam is then rotated with a screwdriver, capturing the post head, and pulling and locking the pieces together.
