= Joinery =

Fixing pieces of wood together

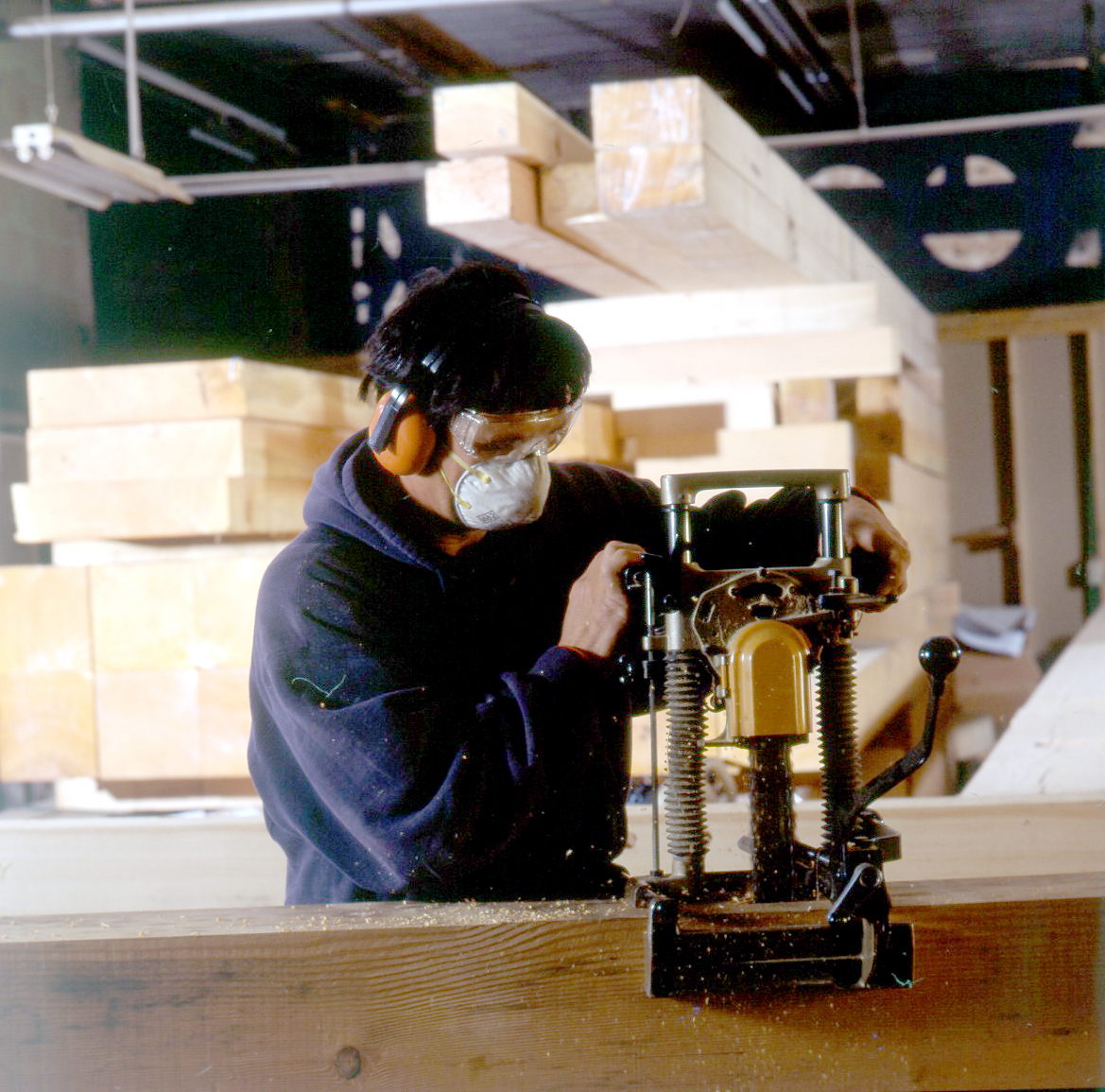
A carpenter uses a chain mortiser to cut a large mortise

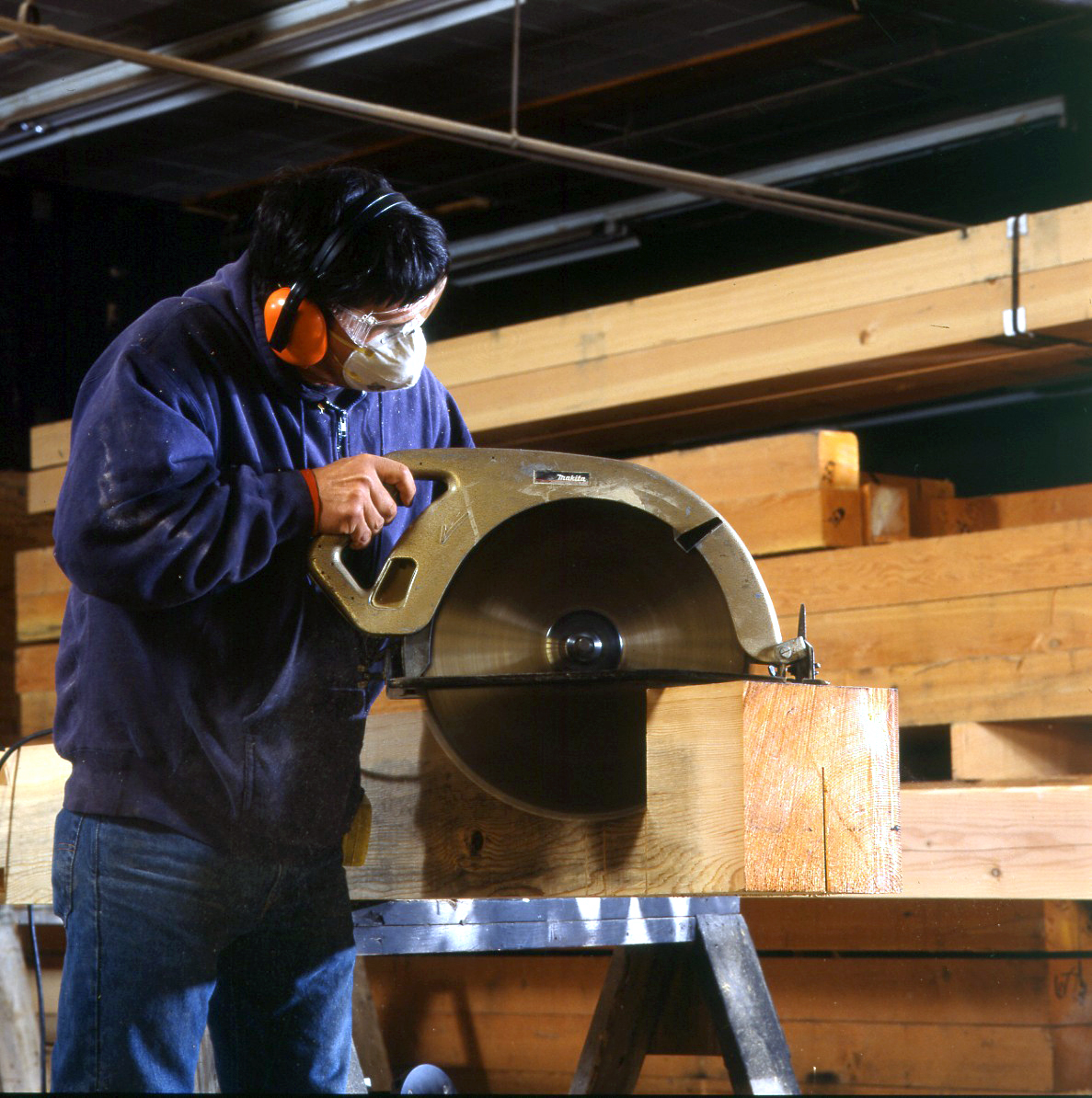
A worker uses a large circular saw to cut joints

Joinery is a part of woodworking that involves joining pieces of wood, engineered lumber, or synthetic substitutes (such as laminate), to produce more complex items. Some woodworking joints employ mechanical fasteners, bindings, or adhesives, while others use only wood elements (such as dowels or plain mortise and tenon fittings).

The characteristics of wooden joints—strength, flexibility, toughness, appearance, etc.—derive from the properties of the materials involved and the purpose of the joint. Therefore, different joinery techniques are used to meet differing requirements. For example, the joinery used to construct a house can be different from that used to make cabinetry or furniture, although some concepts overlap. In British English joinery is distinguished from carpentry, which is considered to be a form of structural timber work; in other locales joinery is considered a form of carpentry.

== History ==
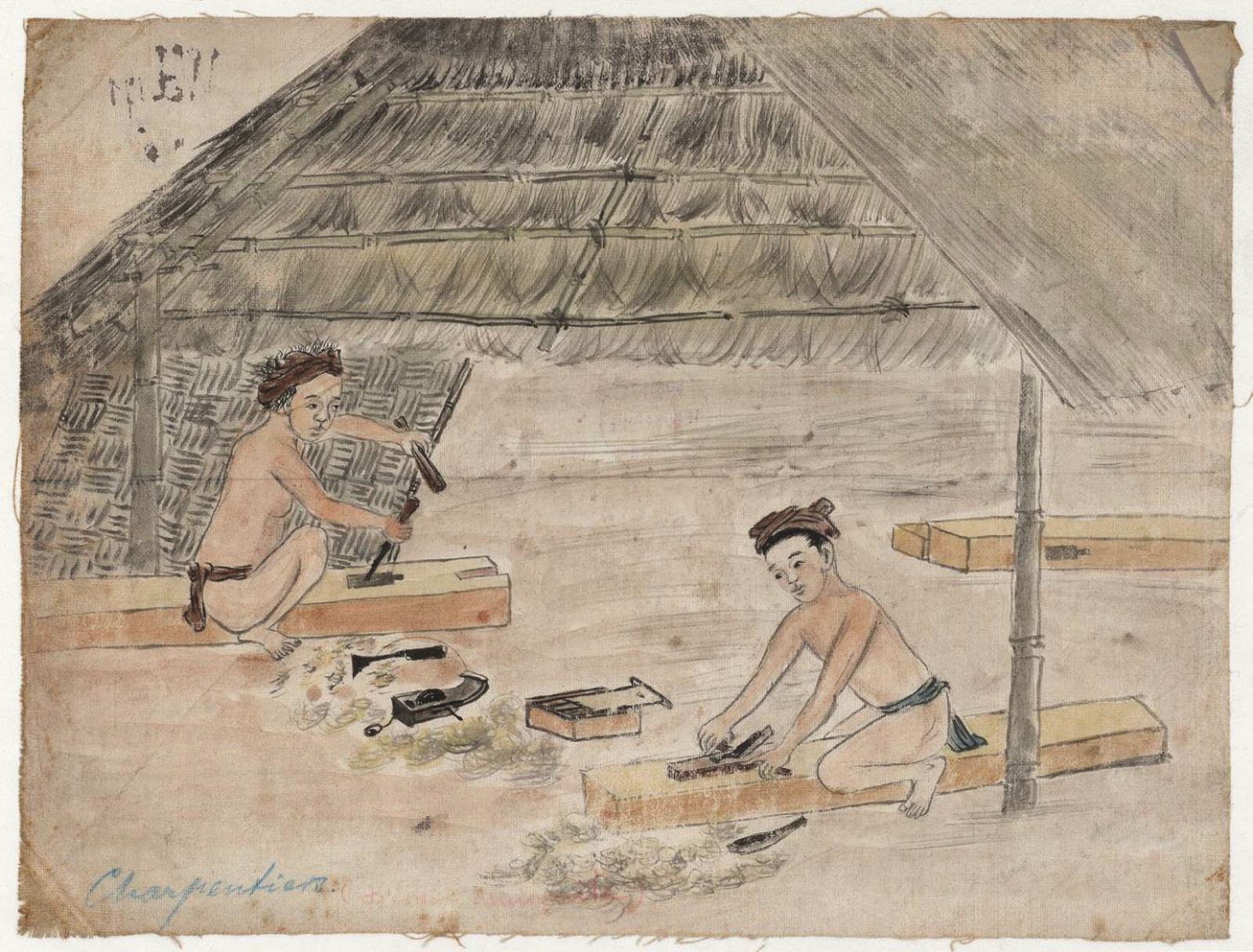
Joinery in Tonkin (now Vietnam) in 1923

Many traditional wood joinery techniques use the distinctive material properties of wood, often without resorting to mechanical fasteners or adhesives. While every culture of woodworking has a joinery tradition, joinery techniques have been especially well-documented, and are celebrated, in the Indian, Chinese, European, and Japanese traditions. Surviving Indian and Egyptian furniture from the first several dynasties show the use of complex joints, such as the dovetail joint, more than 5,000 years ago. This tradition continued to other later Western styles. The 18th-century writer Denis Diderot included more than 90 detailed illustrations of wood joints for building structures alone, in his comprehensive Encyclopédie published in 1765. While Western techniques focused on concealment of joinery, joiners in the Eastern societies traditionally did not attempt to "hide" their joints. The Japanese and Chinese traditions in particular required the use of hundreds of types of joints. The reason was that nails and glues used did not stand up well to the vastly fluctuating temperatures and humid weather conditions in most of Central and South-East Asia. In addition, the highly resinous woods used in traditional Chinese furniture do not glue well, even if they are cleaned with solvents and attached using modern glues.

As the trade, new developments have evolved to help speed, simplify, or improve joinery. Alongside the integration of different glue formulations, newer mechanical joinery techniques include "biscuit" and "domino" joints, and pocket screw joinery.

== Properties of wood ==
Many wood joinery techniques either depend upon or compensate for the fact that wood is anisotropic: its material properties are different along different dimensions.

This must be taken into account when joining wood parts together, otherwise the joint is destined to fail. Gluing boards with the grain running perpendicular to each other is often the reason for split boards, or broken joints. Some furniture from the 18th century, while made by master craftsmen, did not take this into account. The result is a masterful work that may suffer from broken bracket feet, which was often attached with a glued block, which ran perpendicular to the base pieces. The glue blocks were fastened with both glue and nails, resulting in unequal expansion and contraction between the pieces. This was also the cause of splitting of wide boards, which were commonly available and used during that period.

In modern woodworking it is even more critical, as heating and air conditioning cause more severe respiration demands between the environment and the wood's interior fibers. All woodworking joints must take these changes into account, and allow for the resulting movement. Each wood species has a general respiration rate; a generally-assumed time length for acclimating a board to its locale is 1 year per inch of thickness. In preparing raw wood for eventual usage as furniture or structures, one must account for uneven respiration and changes in the wood's dimensions, as well as cracking or checking.

=== Strength ===
Wood is stronger when stressed along the grain (longitudinally) than it is when stressed across the grain (radially and tangentially). Wood is a natural composite material; parallel strands of cellulose fibers are held together by a lignin binder. These long chains of fibers make the wood exceptionally strong by resisting stress and spreading the load over the length of the board. Furthermore, cellulose is tougher than lignin, a fact demonstrated by the relative ease with which wood can be split along the grain compared to across it.

Different species of wood have different strength levels, and the exact strength may vary from sample to sample. Species also may differ on their length, density and parallelism of their cellulose strands.

=== Dimensional stability ===
Timber expands and contracts in response to humidity, usually much less so longitudinally than in the radial and tangential directions. As tracheophytes, trees have lignified tissues which transport resources such as water, minerals and photosynthetic products up and down the plant. While lumber from a harvested tree is no longer alive, these tissues still absorb and expel water causing swelling and shrinkage of the wood in kind with change in humidity. When the dimensional stability of the wood is paramount, quarter-sawn or rift-sawn lumber is preferred because its grain pattern is consistent and thus reacts less to humidity.

== Materials used for joining ==
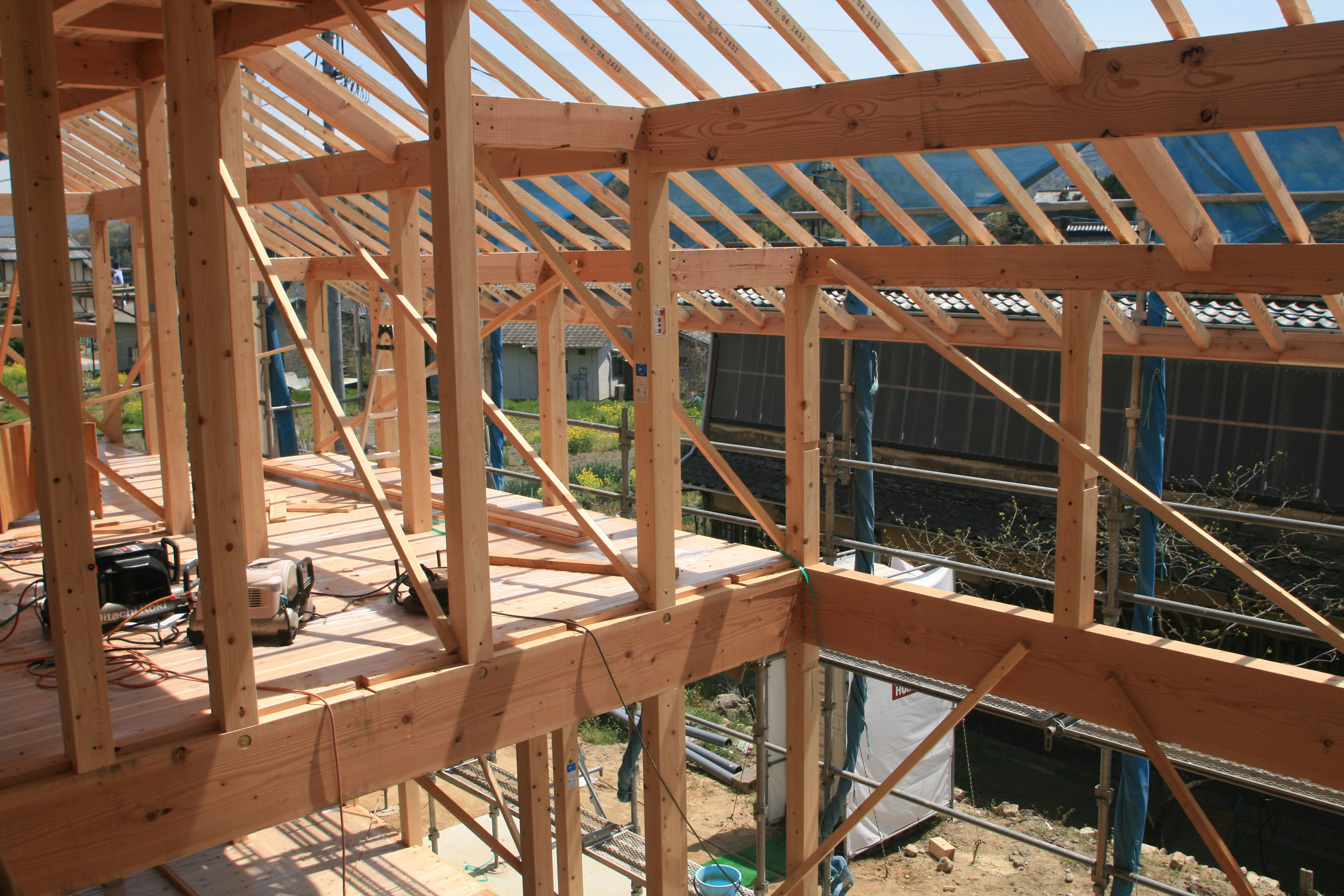
Pin-connected post and beam house framing

- Dowels can secure wood joints hold without the use of glue or mechanical fasteners, as in a pinned mortise and tenon.
- Glue is highly effective for joining timber when both surfaces of the joint are edge grain. A properly glued joint may be as strong or stronger than a single piece of wood. Animal glue is soluble in water, producing joints that can be disassembled using steam to soften the bond.
- Various mechanical fasteners may be used, the simplest being nails and screws. Glue and fasteners can be used together.

=== Reinforcing joints ===
A countersunk doweled joint

- Dowel: A small rod is used internal to a joint both to help align and to strengthen the joint. Traditional joints such as butt joints are used with natural timbers as they do not need materials other than the timber itself. Dowel joints are also useful for pegging together weaker, cheaper composite materials such as laminate-faced chipboard, and where limited woodworking tools are available (since only simple drilled holes are needed to take the dowels). The wood species of a dowel may be different from the overall piece to balance strength with cost, and some joinery may leave a dowel end visible as part of the piece's design.

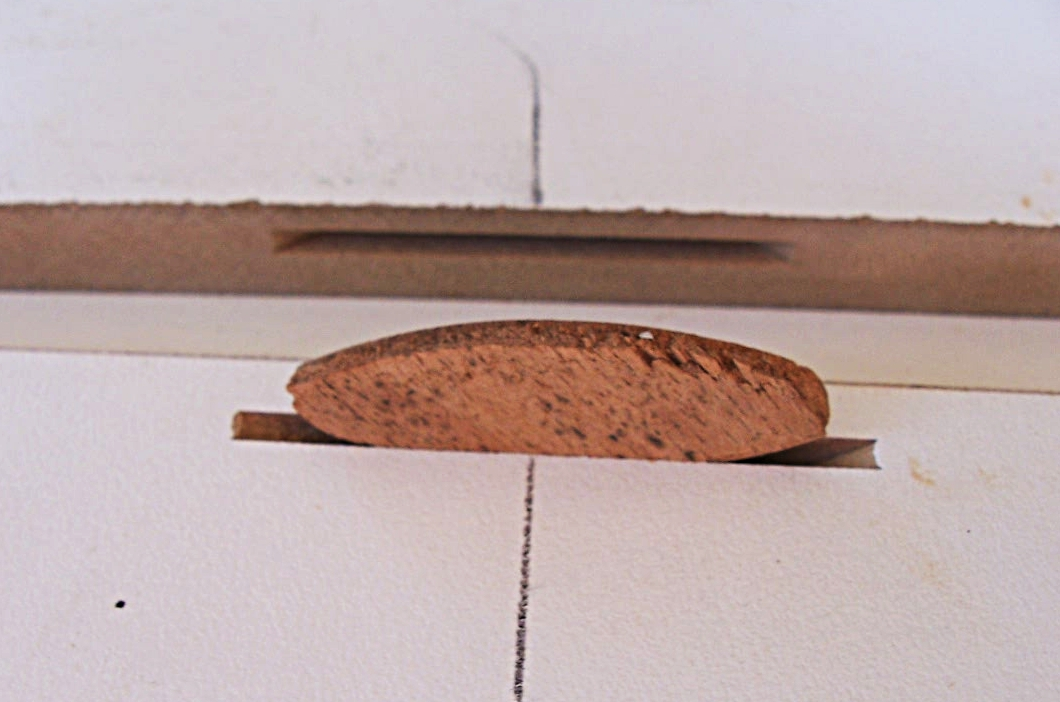
A traditional biscuit in front of the slot cut to receive it

- Biscuit joints: A small preformed wooden 'biscuit' is inserted in a pre-cut slot to help align an edge or butt joint when gluing.
- Domino joiner: A trademarked form of biscuit joiner, using a piece of preformed wood, larger than a traditional biscuit and referred to as a "domino"; has some of the advantages of dowels and of biscuits.

All reinforcements using wood as the introduced spanning material make use of the item's cellulose fibers to resist breakage. Biscuits or dominos may provide only slight strength improvement while still forming a strong alignment guide for the joint's pieces.

== Types of wood joints ==
=== Traditional ===
Most-commonly referenced joints carried forward from historical Western traditions.

Joint	Image	Description
Butt joint		The end of a piece of wood is butted against another piece of wood. This is the simplest and weakest joint. Of those, there is the a) T-butt, b) end-to-end butt, c) Miter butt and d) edge-to-edge butt.
Lap joint		The end of a piece of wood is laid over and connected to another piece of wood. Due to a large surface area of long-grain to long-grain wood and glue surface coverage, this is a very strong joint.
Bridle joint		Also known as open tenon, open mortise and tenon, or tongue and fork joints, this joint is where the through mortise is open on one side and forms a fork shape. The mate has a through tenon or necked joint. Bridle joints are commonly used to join rafter tops, also used in scarf joints and sometimes sill corner joints in timber framing.
Mortise and tenon		A stub (the tenon) will fit tightly into a hole cut for it (the mortise). This is a hallmark of Mission Style furniture, and also the traditional method of jointing frame and panel members in many designs. Can be considered a fully-encapsulated Bridle Joint. Very popular and strong, with variations for the tenon design, appearance, and mechanical pressure.
Dowel joint		The end of a piece of wood is butted against another piece of wood. This is reinforced with dowel pins. This joint is quick to make with production line machinery and so is a very common joint in factory-made furniture.
Cross dowel joint		A threaded metal dowel is inserted into a drilled slot. A screw is then inserted through an opposing slot and tightened to create a pull effect. This type of join is a very common joint in factory-made furniture.
Mitre joint		Similar to a butt joint, but both pieces have been beveled (usually at a 45-degree angle).
Box joint		A corner joint with interlocking square fingers. Receives pressure from two directions.
Dovetail joint		A form of box joint where the fingers are locked together by diagonal cuts.
Dado joint		Also called a housing joint or trench joint, a slot is cut across the grain in one piece for another piece to sit in; shelves on a bookshelf having slots cut into the sides of the shelf, for example.
Groove joint		Like the dado joint, except that the slot is cut with the grain. Sometimes referred to interchangeably with the dado joint.
Tongue and groove		Each piece has a groove cut all along one edge, and a thin, deep ridge (the tongue) on the opposite edge. If the tongue is unattached, it is considered a spline joint.
Birdsmouth joint		Also called a bird's beak cut, this joint used in roof construction. A V-shaped cut in the rafter connects the rafter to the wall-plate.
Cross lap		A joint in which the two members are joined by removing material from each at the point of intersection so that they overlap.
Splice joint		A joint used to attach two members end to end.
Scarf joint		A form of lap joint for attaching the ends of two members using bevel cuts.
Knapp joint		Also known as scallop and dowel, scallop and peg, pin and cove, pin and scallop, or half moon. Most furniture factories in the East and Midwest of the United States made Knapp joint drawers from around 1871 to 1900.

=== Modern ===
Joint	Image	Description
Pocket-hole joinery		A countersunk screw is driven into the joint at an angle.
Biscuit		A wooden oval is glued into two corresponding crescent-shaped slots.
Floating tenon joint		Also known as a loose tenon joint, a type of mortise and tenon joint where both work pieces are mortised to receive a double-ended tenon.
Stitch and glue		Wood panels secured temporarily together, usually with copper wire, and glued permanently in place with epoxy resin.

== Joinery terms ==
When material is removed to create a woodworking joint, the resulting surfaces have the following names:

- Cheek, the flat surface parallel to the face of the joint member which exposes long grain
- Shoulder, the surface perpendicular to the face or edge of the joint member which exposes end grain

== Joinery as a profession ==
A joiner is an artisan and tradesperson who builds things by joining pieces of wood, particularly lighter and more ornamental work than that done by a carpenter, including furniture and the "fittings" of a house, ship, etc. Joiners may work in a workshop, because the formation of various joints is made easier by the use of non-portable, powered machinery, or on job site. A joiner usually produces items such as interior and exterior doors, windows, stairs, tables, bookshelves, cabinets, furniture, etc. In shipbuilding a marine joiner may work with materials other than wood such as linoleum, fibreglass, hardware, and gaskets.

The terms joinery and joiner are in common use in Canada, UK, Australia, and New Zealand. The term is not in common use in America, although the main trade union for American carpenters is called the United Brotherhood of Carpenters and Joiners of America.

In the UK, an apprentice of wood occupations could choose to study bench joinery or site carpentry and joinery. Bench joinery is the preparation, setting out, and manufacture of joinery components while site carpentry and joinery focus on the installation of the joinery components, and on the setting out and fabrication of timber elements used in construction.

In Canada, joinery is considered a separate trade from carpentry. Both having their own apprenticeship path and red-seal certification.

=== History of joinery ===
In the history of technology in Europe, joinery was the medieval development of frame and panel construction, as a means of coping with timber's movement owing to moisture changes. Framed panel construction was utilised in furniture making. The development of joinery gave rise to "joyners", a group of woodworkers distinct from the carpenters and arkwrights (arks were an intermediate stage between a carpenter's boarded chest and a framed chest).

The original sense of joinery is only distantly related to the modern practice of woodworking joints, which are the work of carpenters. This new technique developed over several centuries and joiners started making more complex furniture and panelled rooms. Cabinetmaking became its own distinct furniture-making trade too, so joiners (under that name) became more associated with the room panelling trade.

By the height of craft woodworking (late 18th century), carpenters, joiners, and cabinetmakers were all distinct and would serve different apprenticeships.

In British English, a joiner is colloquially known as a "chippy".

=== Woodworking professions ===
The Carpenter, a figurine of a joiner by Royal Doulton

The Institute of Carpenters recognizes the following professionals working in wood:

- Carpenters
- Furniture and cabinet makers
- Boat builders (woodworking skills)
- Joiners
- Shopfitter
- Structural post and beam carpenters (timber framing)
- Wheelwrights
- Wood carvers
- Wood turners

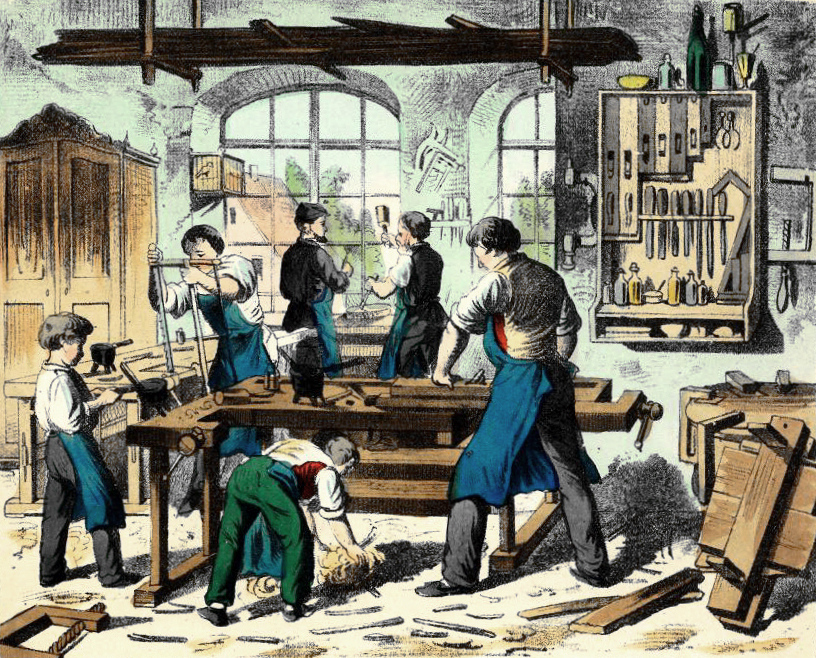
Illustration of an 1880s joiner's shop in Germany

== See also ==
- Building construction
- Cabinet making
- Chinese Wooden Architecture
- Shadow box
- Shaker tilting chair
- Timber framing
- Woodworking
- Jointer, a woodworking tool used to plane boards so that they may be attached or joined
