= Blindfold chess =

Chess variant

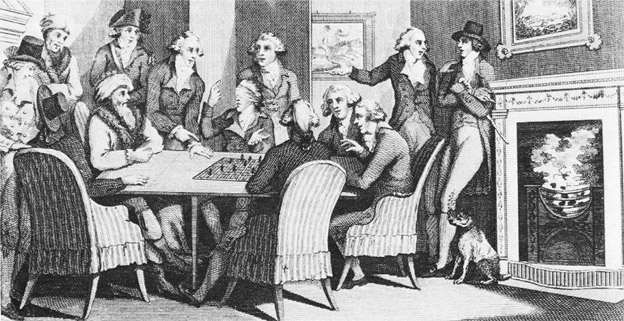
Philidor playing blindfold chess

Blindfold chess, also known as sans voir (French: 'without seeing'), is a form of chess play wherein the players do not see the positions of the pieces and do not touch them. This forces players to maintain a mental model of the positions of the pieces. Moves are communicated via a recognized chess notation.

Blindfold chess was considered miraculous for centuries but now there is greater recognition of people who can keep track of more than one simultaneous blindfolded game. In simultaneous blindfold play, an intermediary usually relays the moves between the players.

== Early history ==
Blindfold chess was first played quite early on in the history of chess. The earliest name to be associated with play without the use of a material board is that of Sa'id bin Jubair (665–714) in the Middle East. In Europe, playing chess blindfolded became popular as a means of handicapping a chess master when facing a weaker opponent, or of simply displaying one's superior abilities.

H. J. R. Murray in his book A History of Chess recorded another type of unseen chess: two Central Asian horsemen riding side by side playing chess by calling chess moves to each other without using a board or pieces.

The first known blindfold event in Europe took place in Florence in 1266. In 1783 the great French player André Danican Philidor demonstrated his ability to play up to three blindfold games simultaneously with great success, with newspapers highlighting his achievement, having taught himself to visualize the board while in bed at night when he had trouble sleeping.

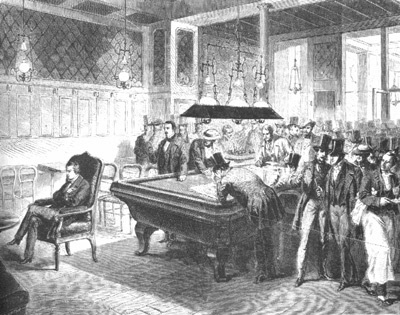
Morphy playing blindfold chess

Paul Morphy held in 1858 a blindfold exhibition against the eight strongest players in Paris with the stunning result of six wins and two draws. Other early masters of blindfold chess were Louis Paulsen, Joseph Henry Blackburne (he played up to 16 simultaneous blindfold games), and the first world champion Wilhelm Steinitz, who in 1867 played six simultaneous blindfold games in Dundee, winning three and drawing three. It was seen by these masters as a good source of income. One of the first female players that is known for having played blindfold in the 1870s is Ellen Gilbert.

As time went by the records for blindfold exhibitions increased. In 1900 Harry Nelson Pillsbury played 20 games simultaneously in Philadelphia; not long after attempting the unusual feat of playing 15 chess and 15 checkers games simultaneously (the record for blindfold checkers being 28 simultaneous games). The Czechoslovak player Richard Réti and Russian World Champion Alexander Alekhine were the next to significantly further the record.

== 20th-century history ==
In 1924, at the Alamac Hotel of New York City, Alekhine played 26 simultaneous blindfold games against very strong opponents (Isaac Kashdan and Hermann Steiner among them), with the score of 16 wins, 5 losses, and 5 draws. This was probably the strongest of any blindfold exhibitions ever held. The next year in February in Paris he faced 28 teams of four players each, with the impressive result of 22 wins, 3 losses, and 3 draws. In the same year, Réti bettered this record by playing 29 players simultaneously in São Paulo, and commented on his poor memory after leaving his briefcase behind after the event.

On July 16, 1934, in Chicago, Alekhine set the new world record by playing 32 blindfold games, with 19 wins, 4 losses, and 9 draws. Edward Lasker was the referee for this event.

Then the world record was set by George Koltanowski on 20 September 1937, in Edinburgh, who played 34 chess games simultaneously while blindfolded. (Note: 13 of the opponents were women.) He won 24 games and lost 10 over a period of 13 hours. Later, Miguel Najdorf broke that record twice. Najdorf's first record in Rosario, Argentina, in 1943, was against 40 opponents, scoring 36 wins, 1 draw, and 3 losses. and was organized in an effort to gain sufficient publicity to communicate to his family that he was still alive, as he had remained in Argentina after travelling from his native Poland to compete in the 1939 Chess Olympiad, during which German Invasion of Poland occurred. He increased this record to 45 opponents in São Paulo in 1947, with the result of 39 wins, 4 draws, and 2 losses. Although Koltanowski initially did not acknowledge Najdorf's record, because he thought that he allegedly had access to the scoresheets, and there were multiple opponents per board, claiming that he could have managed 100 games under those conditions, Najdorf's records are considered legitimate by modern historians. Hungarian Janos Flesch claimed to have bettered this record in Budapest in 1960, playing 52 opponents with 31 wins, 3 draws, and 18 losses. However, this record attempt was somewhat sullied by the fact that Flesch was permitted to verbally recount the scores of the games in progress. It also took place over a remarkably short period of time, around five hours, and included many short games.

One other notable blindfold record was set in 1960 by Koltanowski in San Francisco, when he played 56 consecutive blindfold games at a rate of 10 seconds a move. The exhibition lasted 9 hours with the result of 50 wins and 6 losses. His specialty was conducting a blindfold Knight's Tour on boards of up to 192 squares.

== 21st century 24-hour blindfold chess records ==
A new European record was set in November 2010 by German Marc Lang in Sontheim, Germany, playing 35 opponents with 19 wins, 13 draws, and 3 losses over a period of 23 hours.

Lang improved the world record a year later in November 2011 once again in Sontheim by playing 46 opponents simultaneously and blindfolded, with 25 wins, 19 draws, and just 2 losses.

On December 3, 2016, Timur Gareyev played 48 opponents with a mask before his eyes and sitting on an exercise bike, resulting in 35 wins, 7 draws, and 6 losses.

== Health concerns ==
While blindfold chess has been recommended in moderation by many sources as a method of increasing one's playing strength, simultaneous blindfold exhibitions were officially banned in the USSR in 1930 as they were deemed to be a significant health hazard. Mikhail Botvinnik also warned against it. Blindfold players have reported that it is more tiring than regular play, even if faster time controls are used.

== Psychology ==
Given that it seems to require extraordinary visuo-spatial abilities and memory, this form of chess has led to considerable research in psychology, starting with the research of Alfred Binet in 1893, continuing with the work of chess grandmaster and psychoanalyst Reuben Fine in 1965, and culminating in the late 20th century with several scientific articles describing experiments on the psychology of blindfold chess. In general, this research shows that the crucial attributes of blindfold chess players are their acquired knowledge and their ability to carry out visuo-spatial operations in the mind's eye.

== Modern status ==
Today there are blindfold chess tournaments held throughout the year, with the highest profile event previously being the Melody Amber Tournament, held in Monte Carlo until 2011. Of the modern-day players, Vladimir Kramnik, Viswanathan Anand, Alexei Shirov, and Alexander Morozevich have proven themselves to be particularly strong at blindfold chess, being alternating winners of the Amber Tournaments between 1996 and 2007. Levon Aronian has won Amber three times since then and won the blindfold event at the 2012 SportAccord World Mind Games.

In 2009 the book Blindfold Chess, History, Psychology, Techniques, Champions, World Records and Important Games, by Eliot Hearst and John Knott was published. It was the winner of the Fred Cramer Award for the Best Chess Book of 2009, sponsored by the US Chess Federation, the Chess Journalists of America, and the US Chess Trust.

== See also ==
- Kriegspiel (chess)
