= Domino joiner =

Woodworking tool

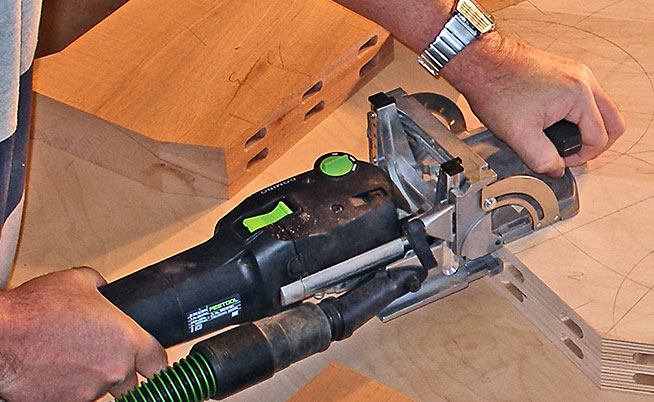
The Domino in action

The Domino is a loose mortise and tenon joining tool manufactured by the German company Festool.

== History and description ==
First introduced in 2005, it came to the US market in 2007.

The core idea for this type of tool came from German master cabinetmaker Vitus Rommel. It envisioned a tool that can cut a mortise in a single operation – putting it on par with a biscuit joiner for speed while allowing for a stronger floating-tenon joint.

The tool implementation by Festool involves a router-like spinning shaft with a special shape cutter bit. The shaft also moves sideways, allowing to cut full round-ended mortises in a single operation. Each plunge creates a mortise that is sized to accept a standard Domino loose tenon with an oval-shaped cross section.

The original tool supported cutter sizes from 4 mm to 10 mm with available tenon sizes from 4×20 mm up to 10×50 mm. This allowed joints in stock as thin as 10 millimetres (0.39 in). Later a bigger tool was introduced allowing tenon sizes up to 14×140 mm, opening many carpentry use cases for the tool family.

The tool series was envisioned from the beginning for high workflow efficiency, namely:

- single-operation workflow
- referencing pins (or flaps, depending on model) for precise operation without marking
- adjustable mortise width, reducing secondary mortises' placement requirements (works with narrow "positioning" of the first mortise for placement while secondary mortises are placed 'loosely' for strength)
- fence natively supports tilting between 0° and 90° with stops at common angles
- the plunge depth, mortise width, tilt angle and pins/flaps referencing are adjustable without tools and without adjusting the cutter
- standardized cutters with exact dimensions avoid the need of precise cutter positioning in the collet

The compactness of a hand-operated tool, coupled with the focus on workflow efficiency is what allows the Domino mortising tools to service most use cases typically served by the simpler biscuit and dowel joint tools, expanding loose-tenon use cases significantly.

In smaller businesses or with the DIY users, where industrial machinery is not available, a cabinetmaker may employ a Domino loose-tenon joint where other less complicated but more laborious, and/or weaker joints would have to be employed otherwise.

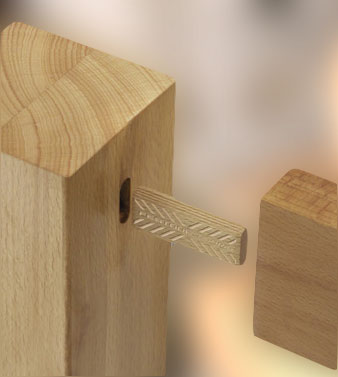
Exploded domino joint

== Advantages ==
- Allows very quick joinery, useful in a commercial carpentry setting
- Flat tenons resist torquing
- Stronger than a biscuit joiner

== Disadvantages ==
- High tool cost compared to other joinery methods
- Proprietary tenons required
- Noise, similar to biscuit joiners
- The original series of tools cannot operate without external dust extraction

== See also ==
- Biscuit joiner — general page on biscuit joinery methods
- Dowelmax — another loose tenon joinery system
- Dowels - general page on dowels
