= Spline joint =

A spline joint can be viewed as an extended biscuit. Two boards have extended, matching grooves lined up and facing each other. The void between is filled with a thin piece of wood, forming a spline joint. This is very similar to tongue and groove. The difference is that the spline essentially forms a tongue, a 'loose tongue', for both grooves. It is often joined with glue.
