= Wood (magazine) =

Magazine for home and hobby woodworkers

Cover of Wood

Wood is a magazine catering to the home and hobby woodworker with offices are in Des Moines, Iowa, US. It claims more than 350,000 subscribers. It publishes seven regular issues annually (December/January, March, May, July, September, October, and November). It has the highest circulation of any woodworking magazine in the world. The magazine is owned by People Inc.

== History and profile ==
Wood was founded in 1984 by Larry Clayton; it follows the principle of Better Homes and Gardens's test kitchen, where recipes published in the magazine have been tested. Every project in the magazine has been built in Wood's woodworking shop; every woodworking technique published has been tried and accomplished by the editors; and every tool or product discussed has been shop-tested and its performance evaluated.

Founder Clayton was editor-in-chief until retiring in 2000, after issue 132, April 2001; he was succeeded by Bill Krier, who retired in April 2012, followed by Dave Campbell, then Lucas Peters.
