= Hermann Steiner =

Hermann Steiner (1913 - 14 November 2005) was a Swiss inventor and businessman.

In 1944, Steiner opened his carpenters shop in Liestal, Switzerland. He invented a system in 1956 that he called the Lamello Joining System which is now known as the biscuit joiner or plate joiner. He also produced the first portable plate joiner in the late 1960s. In 1969, his family operation was incorporated under the name Lamello AG.
