= Biscuit joiner =

Woodworking machine

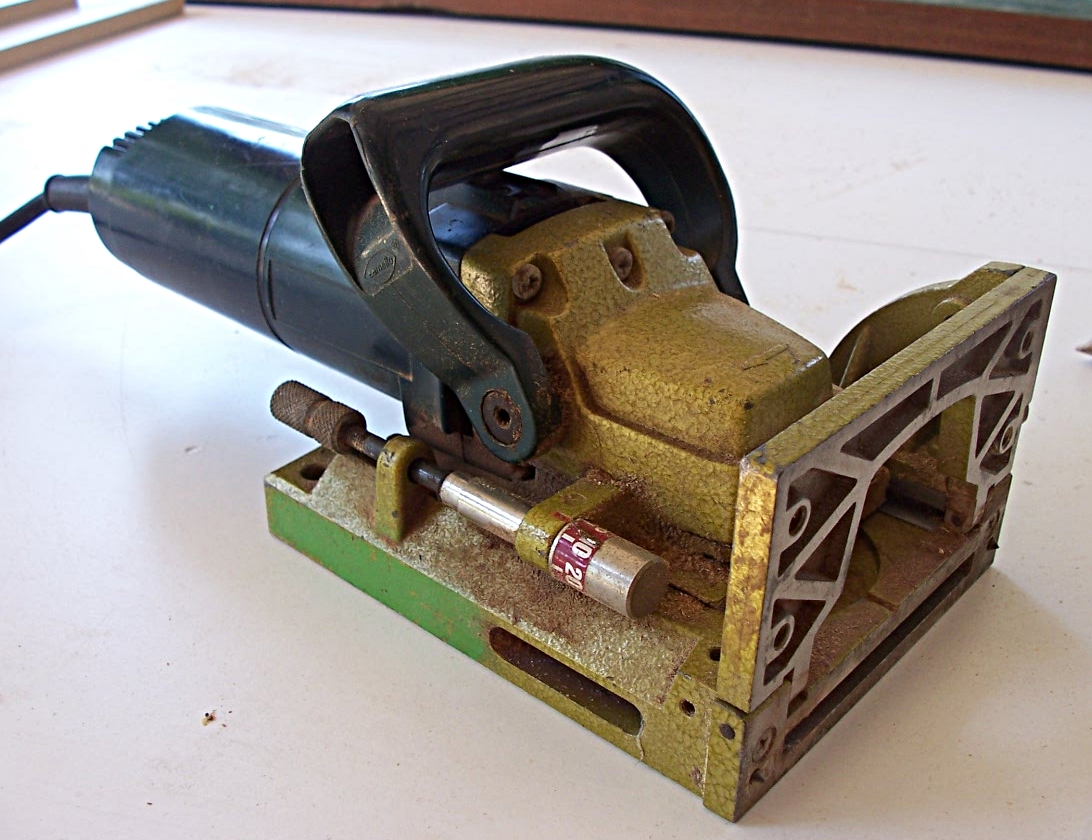
Lamello Top biscuit jointer

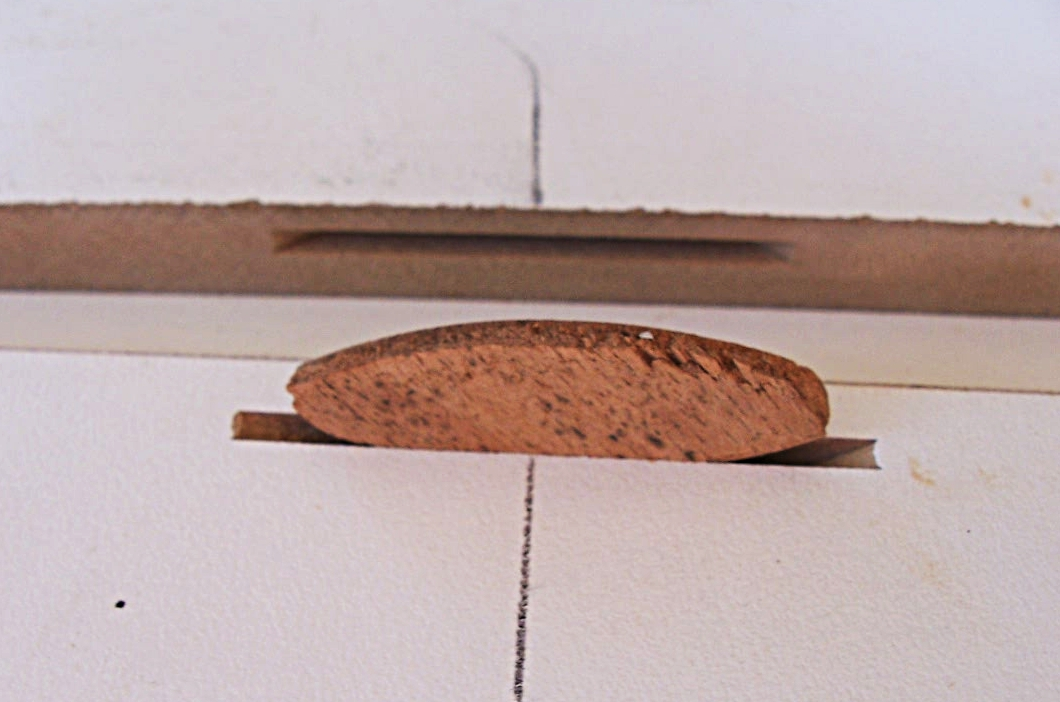
Edges of 16 mm medium-density fibreboard with a No. 0 biscuit, set up to make a right angle joint.

A biscuit joiner or biscuit jointer (or sometimes plate joiner) is a woodworking tool used to join two pieces of wood together. A biscuit joiner uses a small circular saw blade to cut a crescent-shaped hole (called the mouth) in the opposite edges of two pieces of wood or wood composite panels. An oval-shaped, highly dried and compressed wooden biscuit (beech or particle wood) is covered with glue, or glue is applied in the slot. The biscuit is immediately placed in the slot, and the two boards are clamped together. The wet glue expands the biscuit, further improving the bond.

== History ==
The biscuit joining system was invented in 1956 in Liestal, Switzerland, by Hermann Steiner. Steiner opened his carpenter's shop in 1944, and, in the middle of the 1950s, while looking for a simple means of joining the recently introduced chipboard, invented the Lamello joining system. In the succeeding years there followed further developments such as the circular saw and the first stationary biscuit (plate) joining machine in 1956 followed by the first portable biscuit joiner for Lamello grooves in 1968. In 1969 the family operation was incorporated by the name of Lamello AG. Lamello continues to manufacture biscuit joiners.

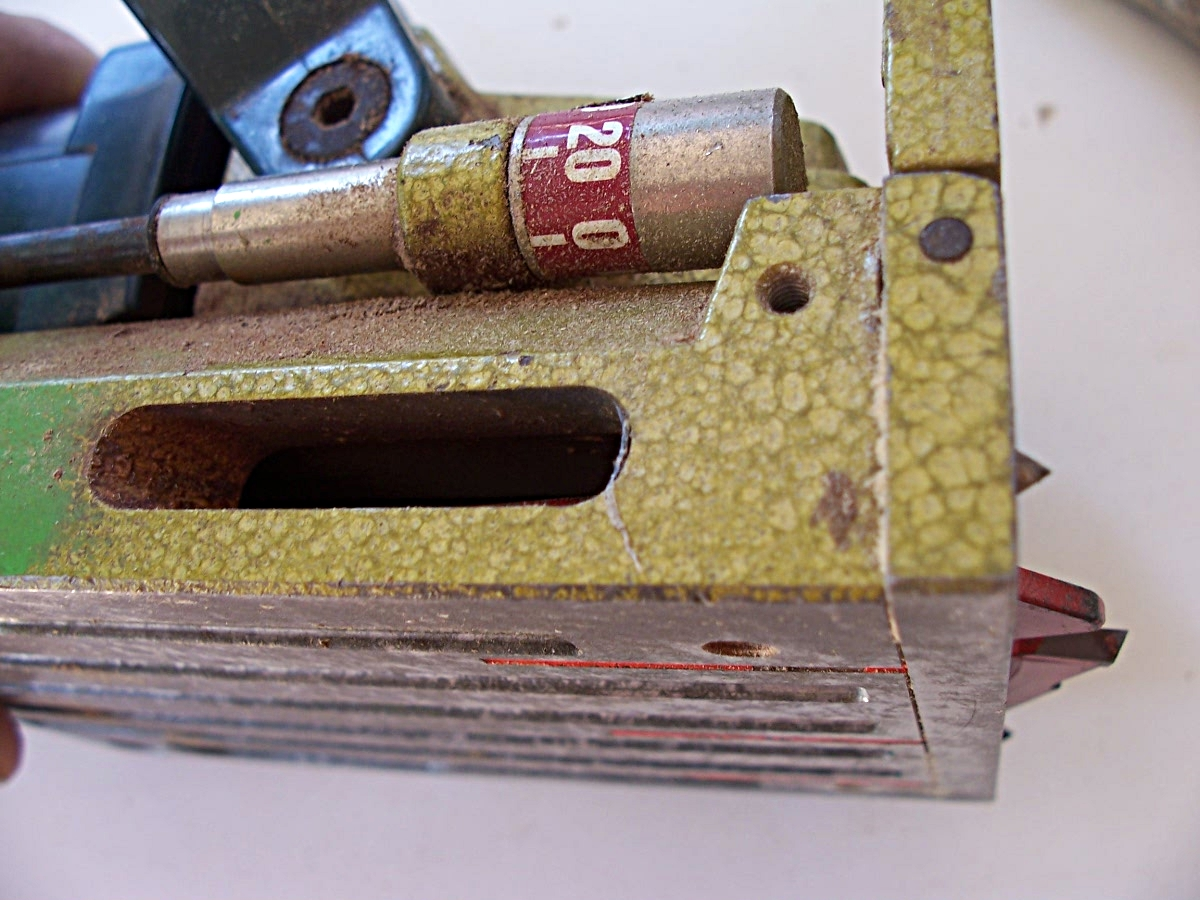
Lamello Top biscuit joiner with blade extended

Several other companies such as Porter Cable, DeWalt and Makita also manufacture compatible biscuit joiners, including some models with interchangeable blades, enabling the user to cut both 4-and-2-inch (102 and 51 mm) biscuit slots.

== Production ==
Biscuits are predominantly used in joining sheet goods such as plywood, particle board and medium-density fibreboard. They are sometimes used with solid wood, replacing mortise and tenon joints, as biscuit joints are easier to make and almost as strong. They are also used to align pieces when joined edge-to-edge in making wider panels. It is important to use the same face when cutting the slots, so the boards are perfectly flush.

Biscuits are also used to align edges of workpieces, such as when forming a 90° angle between workpieces. The biscuit provides a quick means of getting a perfectly flush joint, while at the same time reinforcing the joint.

Typically, the machine will have an adjustable fence, so it can be set on an angle for joining mitered pieces.

Also, there are other types of specialty biscuits available, from metal connectors, used for removable panels, to hinges, making these portable machines even more flexible.

== Usage ==
The workpieces are brought together and the user marks the location for the biscuits. Precise measurement is not required, as the biscuits are hidden when the pieces are assembled, so a quick pencil stroke that marks both pieces where they align is all that is required. The parts are separated and the machine is used to cut the slots in each piece. The machine has reference marks on the centerline of the blade for easy alignment to the marks on the materials being joined.

The body of the machine with the blade is spring-loaded, and in the normal position the blade is retracted. The operator aligns the machine and uses firm pressure to push the body forward against the base plate to make the cut. The waste material is blown out of the slot on the right of the base plate.

Because the slots are slightly longer than the biscuits, it is still possible to slide the panels sideways after the joint is assembled (before the glue sets). This fact makes the biscuit joiner easy to use, because it does not require extreme accuracy or jigs to achieve perfect joints.

The depth of the cut can be altered by an adjustable stop. The smaller base can be rotated through 90°, and accessories are provided for altering the offset of the base to the blade (for use with thicker or thinner materials as required). Some models allow slots to be cut at angles other than 90° to the joining face, for example 45°, which greatly speeds up the assembly of things like cabinets.

== Standard biscuit sizes ==
| Size | Metric biscuits (Note: Biscuits may also be referred to as plates) in mm (L × W × T) | Inch biscuits in inches (L × W × T) | Notes |
|---|---|---|---|
| No. H9 | 38 × 12 × 3 mm (Note: These data require clarification because the standard cutter width is 4 mm thus requiring the biscuit to be thinner. It is more likely that the thickness is 3.75 mm which would correspond well to the typical inch thickness (19/128 in = 3.77 mm).) | | Uses a smaller cutter wheel 3 mm wide. |
| No. 0 | 47 × 15 × 4 mm | 1 27/32 × 5/8 × 19/128 | Standard cutter width is 4 mm or 5/32 in. |
| No. 10 | 53 × 19 × 4 mm | 2 1/8 × 3/4 × 19/128 | |
| No. 20 | 56 × 23 × 4 mm | 2 3/8 × 1 × 19/128 | One source uses 2 1/4 in for length. |
| D | Furniture hinge | Depth of groove: 13 mm | Use only on biscuit joiner with six-depth setting |
| S | Slide-in connector | Depth of groove: 14.7 mm | Use only on biscuit joiner with six-depth setting |
| S6 | 85 × 30 × 4 mm | | |

Six-depth settings of biscuit joiner (six-size biscuits with no blade change) include Nos. 00, 10, 20, D, S, S6

== Sizes of Porter Cable biscuits ==
| Size | Metric biscuits in mm (L × W) | Inch biscuits in inches (L × W) | Notes |
|---|---|---|---|
| No. FF | 30 × 13 mm | 1 13/64 × 1/2 | FF = Face frame for 1 1/2 in width, and up. |
| No. 0 | 47 × 16 mm | 1 27/32 × 5/8 | |
| No. 10 | 52 × 20 mm | 2 3/64 × 25/32 (≈3/4) | |
| No. 20 | 58 × 24 mm | 2 9/32 (≈2 1/4) × 15/16 (≈1 in) | |

The sizes were taken verbatim from the Porter-Cable website.

== Detail biscuit sizes ==
Detail biscuits are smaller than standard biscuits and are typically used to join smaller pieces of wood together, and offer less structural support.

| Size | Metric biscuits in mm (L × W × T) | Inch biscuits in inches (L × W × T) | Notes |
|---|---|---|---|
| R1 | 16 × 5.6 × 2.4 mm | 5/8 × 7/32 × 3/32 | |
| R2 | 19 × 7.1 × 2.4 mm | 3/4 × 9/32 × 3/32 | |
| R3 | 25.4 × 12.7 × 2.4 mm | 1 × 1/2 × 3/32 | |

== Blades and depth ==
For most portable plate joiners, a nominal 4-inch or 100 mm diameter blade is used for the Nos. 0, 10, 20 biscuit cuts. The blade is set deeper for joining the larger biscuits. Most blades have 4, 6, or 8 teeth and fit a 7/8-inch or 22 mm arbor. The thickness of the blade is typically 0.156 to 0.160 inch or nominally 4 mm.

== See also ==
- Router (woodworking)
- Laminate trimmer
- Dowelmax – another loose-tenon joining method

== Notes and references ==
- Bruce Gray, "Testing Joints to the Breaking Point", Fine Woodworking magazine, No.148, April 2001.
- sources : https://web.archive.org/web/20130717202631/http://www.lamello.com/fileadmin/user_upload/mediacenter/0%20Katalog/Lamello_Catalogue_EN.pdf
