= Pocket-hole joinery =

Technique for joining wood

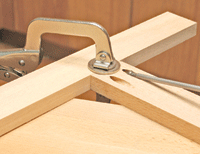
Pocket-hole joint being assembled.

Pocket-hole joinery, or pocket-screw joinery, involves drilling a hole at an angle — usually 15 degrees — into one work piece, and then joining it to a second work piece with a self-tapping screw.

== Pocket hole machines ==
Modern pocket hole machines are capable of routing low-angle pockets - as low as 3 degrees - creating more flush, stronger joints by minimizing the joint shift or “creep” that occurs when creating pockets and joints by using a pocket hole jig or by hand.

== Pocket hole jigs ==
Pocket holes can be formed by drilling a series of holes until a pocket hole is created, but pocket hole jigs make the process much quicker and easier. Pocket hole jigs allow the user to drill a hole at an accurate angle to get a good joint. Using a pocket hole jig also makes for a cleaner and neater appearance as opposed to creating a pocket hole without the help of a jig. A pocket hole jig is generally made of plastic and has a metal insert that the drill bit is inserted through to drill the hole. A jig can be a stationary device that the wooden pieces are clamped into, or a portable device that is clamped onto the wooden pieces.

== Technique ==
When joining boards at a right angle, it is important that the cuts are precise and square to prevent gaps or non-perpendicular joints between the boards. Some woodworkers lay out their project before drilling their pocket holes and mark the face of the board that they want to drill to ensure the hole is in the correct location. Most pocket joints are made by screwing into the face or the edge of the board rather than the end grain because the screw will grab better.

== Pocket hole joint screws ==
Self-tapping pocket screws are used for pocket hole joints. Pocket screws are generally more expensive, but they are needed for a tight, strong joint. Pocket screws have a wide washer head to spread the load for a firm bond, and prevent screwing too far into the joint and cracking the wood. The self tapping screws will grip any type of wood, but coarse threads are needed for softer wood and fine threads are needed for harder.

Pocket hole joint screws will vary in length depending on the thicknesses of the two pieces of material being joined. This is an important factor in correctly laying out a pocket hole joint, and a common cause for error.

== Benefits ==
- Because the screws act as internal clamps holding the joint together, glue is unnecessary (but usually recommended) for most common joints. If glue is used, clamping is not required because of the ‘internal clamps’ holding the joint together while the glue cures.
- Gluing and screwing the joints together prevents gaps from forming as wood shrinks and expands with temperature and moisture.
- Requires only one hole to be drilled, eliminating the need to precisely line up mating workpieces, as is required with dowel and mortise and tenon joints.
- Does not require any complex mathematics or measurements, such as those used in mortise and tenon joints.
- Because pocket-hole joinery doesn't require access to the inside of the joint, quick repairs are possible without completely disassembling the joint.

== Drawbacks ==
- A broken pocket-hole joint "likely can’t be repaired".
- Although the holes can be plugged the pocket hole may be considered unsightly when all sides of the joint are visible.
- It is not suitable for joining thin pieces of wood. The boards must have a minimum thickness of 10 to 15 mm (3/8 to 9/16 in).
- Pocket-hole joints are substantially weaker than joints which use dowels, or mortises.

== Applications ==
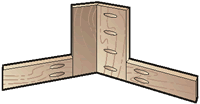
Angles

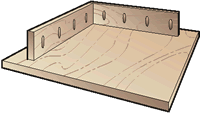
Aprons

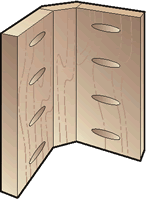
Beveled corners

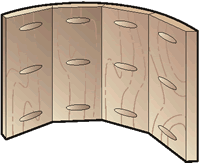
Curves

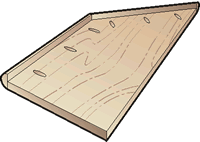
Edge banding

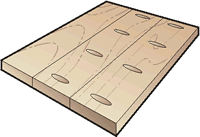
Edge joining

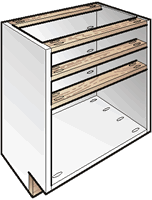
Euro-style cabinets

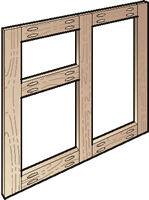
Face frames

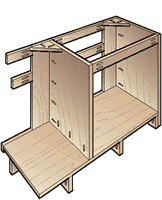
Cabinet frames

Leg rails

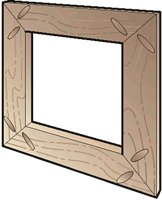
Picture frames

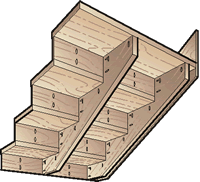
Stairs

Window jambs
